= Marie Foster =

American civil rights activist (1917–2003)

- Born: Marie Priscilla Martin; October 24, 1917; Wilcox County, Alabama, United States
- Died: September 6, 2003 (aged 85); Selma, Alabama, United States
- Occupations: Activist; Dental assistant
- Known for: Being "the mother of the voting rights movement"
- Spouse: James Foster (m,1931-1939)
- Children: 3 James Foster (son, 1931-2008) Rose Foster (daughter)
- Parent: Squire (Square) Martin (father) Virginia Pettiway (mother)
- Relatives: Sullivan Jackson (brother) Tom Martin (brother) Irene Pettiway (sister) Thelma Jackson (sister)

Marie Priscilla Martin Foster (October 24, 1917 – September 6, 2003) was a leader in the Civil Rights Movement in the U.S. during the 1960s. Her successful voter registration in Dallas County, Alabama fueled her to become an activist, and she began teaching adult classes to help people pass the required literacy tests. She was a member of the Dallas County Voters League, the Alabama foot soldier that convinced Martin Luther King Jr. to come to Selma, Alabama and helped organize the Selma to Montgomery marches in 1965. Her dedication gave her the moniker "The Mother of the Voting Rights Movement," which was shortened to Mother Foster.

== Early life and work ==
Marie Foster was born Maria Priscilla Martin on October 24, 1917, near Alberta, Alabama in the Black Belt. Like the rest of the South, Wilcox County, Alabama was segregated, and educational opportunities were limited for Black students. Going against her husband, Squire (Square) Martin's wishes, Foster's mother, Virginia Pettiway, moved her and her siblings to Selma to ensure her children got the best education they could.

Though her siblings graduated, Foster dropped out after she met James Foster and got married. She had three children, whom she raised alone after her husband, James Foster's death. Determined to finish her education and provide the best she could for her children, she went back to school, graduating a year after her daughter, Rose.

Foster then enrolled in a local junior college to become a dental hygienist. After completing her training, she worked for her brother, Dr. Sullivan Jackson in a local practice in Selma. Her dedication to education proved to be important as she fought against the Jim Crow system that denied Black voters from registering throughout the South.

== Civil rights movement ==
=== Early years of voter registration activism ===
Black voters in the South were subjected to unfair and racist practices by white registrars. Literacy tests and poll taxes prevented most voters at the offices because of the lack of equal pay and education. In some cases, those that attempted to register had their addresses published in the newspaper, which put them at risk of retaliation by whites, including violent attacks and termination of jobs.

Because Marie Foster worked for her brother, who owned his own dental practice, she did not face the high threat level this retaliation like many others would. She was not immune to it or ignored for her work, but her economic independence meant she could work for her right to vote. In 1961 in Dallas County, Alabama, roughly 156 Black people were registered to vote out of 15,000, and only 12 were new registrants since 1954. The Dallas County Voters League, an organization found in the mid-1920s with about a dozen members including Foster, worked closely in gaining the recognition needed to pass two laws in favor of decreasing the obstacles in place to discourage African Americans to vote.

Foster failed the voter registration test eight times before she finally passed and was granted her right to vote. From then on, she dedicated her life to the Civil Rights Movement: "I decided to become involved in the Civil Rights Movement because the race relations were so bad in Selma, I had a vision that we could do something about the bias conditions in Selma, the state, and someday the world."

Foster's education and experience with the literacy tests equipped her with critical skills in preparing other Black residents of the county to pass the test and register voters. She printed flyers inviting people to a literacy class, unsure of how many would come. Many residents feared the repercussions, others were unsure if the movement would be successful. Foster's first class had just one pupil - a 70-year-old man who had never learned to read or write. Foster spent the time teaching him to write his name. Eventually, Foster's patience and knack for teaching spread throughout the area, and more and more people joined the classes to learn from her, trusting that she could help them without making them feel lesser than because they lacked a good education. Foster remarks how on one Thursday night, the same 70-year-old man came, but this time bringing along other individuals, slowly growing the meetings each week. As Foster's literary classes were attempted to be shut down many times, even resulting in Judge James Hare banning groups of three or more from meeting regarding civil rights and dealing with Klansmen's increasing threats. A group known as the "Courageous Eight" with members like Marie Foster, Amelia Boynton, and F.D. Reese refused to stop meeting and instead conducted their regular meetings now in secret.

=== Work as a movement foot soldier ===
Foster became interested in the civil rights movement in the early 1960s because she felt "the race relations were so bad in Selma". She was part of the revival of the Dallas County Voters League, a group of African Americans that pushed for improvements in the system for voter registration and belonged to its eight-member steering committee, known as the "Courageous Eight".

=== 1963 speech at the First Baptist Church ===
On October 5, 1963, Foster delivered a speech to the individuals gathered at the First Baptist Church in Selma, Alabama. Within the speech, she states the many examples of discrimination both her and fellow African American individuals face while also touching upon the discrimination seen worldwide, ultimately urging members in attendance to "awaken" and push back on discrimination to receive their freedoms. Foster moves on by addressing how some white individuals have started to realize the lack of differences between white and African American individuals stating "But there are places in Alabama that have awakened. They realize the value of the black dollar." Bringing her speech to a close, Foster lists African American individuals who have broken the racial barrier in the past like Pinckney Benton Steward Pinchback, Blanche Kelso Bruce, and James Pike.

=== Marches ===
As the civil rights movement grew, Foster became an organizer for the Dallas County area. She participated in the march on March 7, 1965, that became known as Bloody Sunday. As the march approached the Edmund Pettus Bridge, a combined state trooper and police force led by Sheriff, Jim Clark, stopped the march, violently beating many of the participants. Foster was at the front of one of the lines along with John Lewis, who had to be admitted to the hospital with a head injury and Amelia Boynton, and was clubbed by a state trooper, leaving her with swollen knees. Out of the individuals marching, 57 people were injured and 17 were hospitalized. The next day on March 8, 1965, the march over the Edmund Pettus Bridge was reported by The New York Times while news reporters captured the beatings on television for the nation's millions of Americans to view. Despite her injuries, two weeks later, on March 21, 1965, Foster participated in the march that eventually made it all the way to Montgomery, Alabama, successfully walking fifty miles over five days. She was one of the two women to complete it.

Martin Luther King Jr. learned that Lyndon B. Johnson would sign the Voting Rights Act when he was at Foster's house. He is said to have cried at the news while with Foster.

== Later life and legacy ==
After the Voting Rights Act was passed, Foster continued to work as a dental assistant. In 1984, Foster worked on Rev. Jesse Jackson's presidential campaign. In her free time, she taught children how to read and drove children to Sunday school. She carried on campaigning, fighting for public housing of the poor in Selma, conduct of white bus drivers or asking for the statue of the Klan founder to be taken away from a public park.

In 1990, Marie Foster along with Amelia Boynton-Robinson, Albert Turner, and Dr. C.T. Vivian founded the National Voting Rights Museum and Institute. Located in Selma, Alabama, the museum focuses on voting rights as a whole while also offering an abundance of accounts from individuals who attended the Bloody Sunday march along with items recovered. She fought many mayoral elections to replace the mayor of Selma Joseph Smitherman who was in office during the Selma to Montgomery marches.

She died on September 6, 2003. She is buried at Serenity Memorial Gardens in Selma, Alabama.

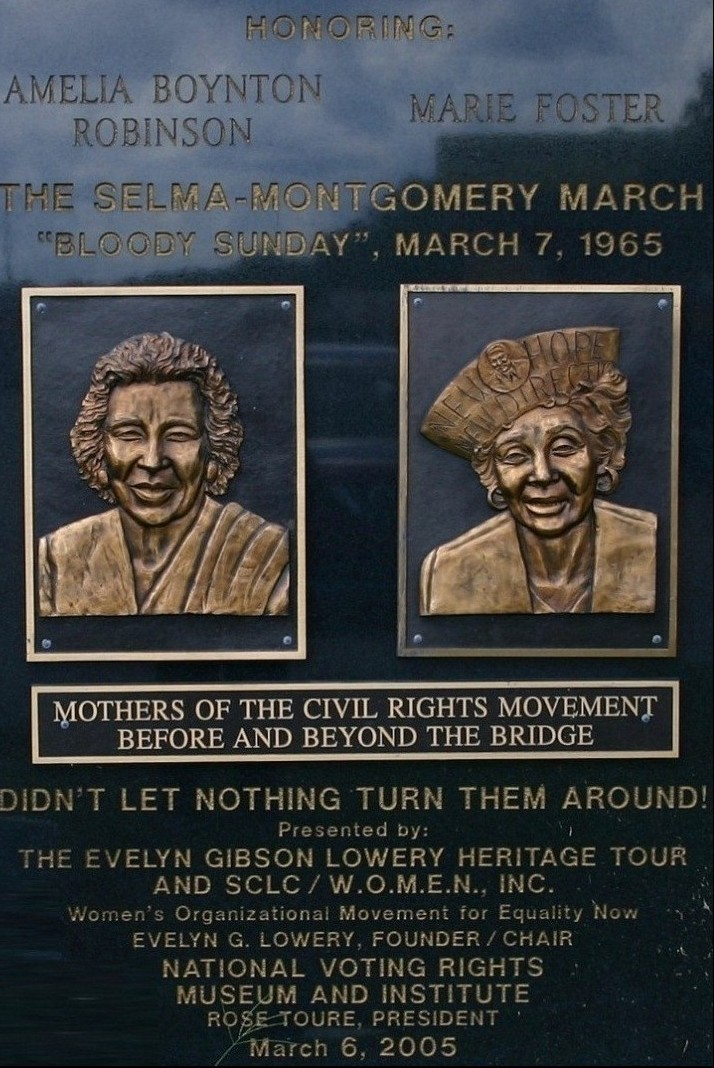
Monument honoring Marie Foster and Amelia Boynton Robinson in Selma, Alabama

After her death, in 2005, Marie Foster along with Amelia Boynton Robinson was honored with a monument located in Selma, Alabama for holding citizenship classes in her home. These citizenship classes were put in place to educate others in her community on the literary tests being distributed at various voting locations.

Foster was posthumously named an honoree by the National Women's History Alliance in 2020.

== See also ==
- List of civil rights leaders
- National Voting Rights Museum in Selma, which has a room named for her.
