= James Perkins Jr. =

Mayor of Selma, Alabama

- Perkins in 2024

Mayor of Selma, Alabama
- In office 2000–2008
- Preceded by: Joseph Smitherman
- In office 2020–present

Personal details
- Born: 1952 or 1953
- Education: Bachelor's degree in Mathematics
- Alma mater: Alabama A&M University, Auburn University at Montgomery
- Occupation: Businessman, Pastor, Educator

James Perkins Jr. (born 1952 or 1953) is an American politician who is the incumbent mayor of Selma, Alabama. The first African American mayor of the city, he won a runoff election in 2000 and served two terms, lost his second bid for reelection in 2008, and won a third non-consecutive term in 2020.

Perkins grew up in Selma, where his parents were an elementary school principal and a nurse, and graduated in 1971 in the first racially integrated class at Selma High School; he organized an unsuccessful effort to use the former black high school as the integrated school, rather than the former white school. He has a bachelor's degree in mathematics from Alabama A&M University and took business courses at Auburn University at Montgomery. He is a businessman and pastor and has also taught mathematics and computer science at Selma University. In December 2015 he was elected presiding pastor of Ebenezer Missionary Baptist Church in Selma, succeeding F. D. Reese.

After working as a computer consultant out of state, Perkins returned to Selma as manager of Reese's unsuccessful 1980 campaign against the long-term mayor of Selma, Joe Smitherman, a former segregationist. He returned again in 1991 and ran against Smitherman himself in 1992 and 1996 before succeeding in a run-off in September 2000 in defeating Smitherman's bid for his tenth consecutive term. He was Selma's first African American mayor. In 2008 he was elected president of the National Conference of Black Mayors.

Perkins served two terms in office; in 2008, George Evans, who was Selma's first African American City Council president, defeated his bid for reelection. He ran again in 2016 after Evans's second term but was defeated by State Representative Darrio Melton. Perkins was elected in a run-off over Miah Jackson to secure a third non-consecutive term in 2020.

== See also ==
- List of first African-American mayors
