= Alberta, Alabama =

Unincorporated community in Alabama, United States

- Unincorporated community
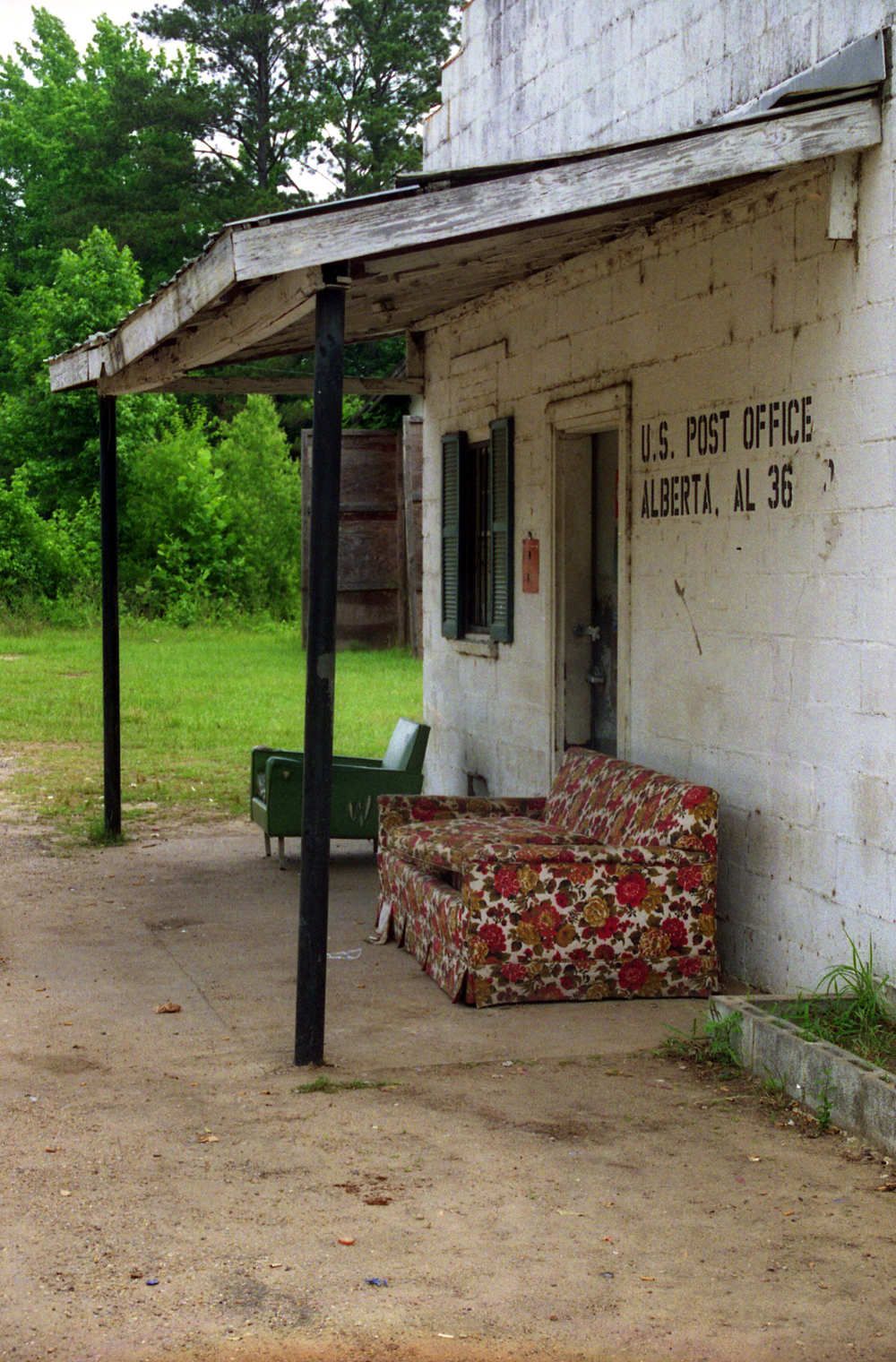
- Former post office in Alberta

- Location within the state of Alabama Alberta, Alabama (the United States)
- Coordinates: 32°13′55.51″N 87°24′35.99″W
- Country: United States
- State: Alabama
- County: Wilcox
- Elevation: 177 ft (54 m)

Population (2010)
  - Total: 784
- Time zone: UTC-6 (Central (CST))
  - Summer (DST): UTC-5 (CDT)
- ZIP code: 36720
- Area code: 334

Alberta is an unincorporated community in Wilcox County, Alabama, United States.

The community has the name of Alberta Bush, the wife of a railroad official.

== Geography ==
Alberta is located at 32.23208°N 87.40999°W and has an elevation of 177 feet (54 m).

== Demographics ==
=== Alberta Census Division (1960-) ===
Historical population
Census	Pop.	Note	%±
1960	3,121		—
1970	2,424		−22.3%
1980	2,039		−15.9%
1990	1,818		−10.8%
2000	1,684		−7.4%
2010	1,308		−22.3%
U.S. Decennial Census

Alberta has never reported separately as an unincorporated community on the U.S. Census. However, the census division for the northernmost part of Wilcox County was named for Alberta when it was created in 1960. The census-designated places (CDPs) of Boykin and Catherine are located within the Alberta census division. Since 1960 to 2010, it has reported a Black majority in the division.

== Climate ==
The climate in this area is characterized by hot, humid summers and generally mild to cool winters. According to the Köppen Climate Classification system, Alberta has a humid subtropical climate, abbreviated "Cfa" on climate maps.

== Notable people ==
- Marie Foster, leader in the Civil Rights Movement during the 1960s.
- Joseph Smitherman, mayor of Selma, Alabama for 35 years.
