= Frederick D. Reese =

American civil rights activist

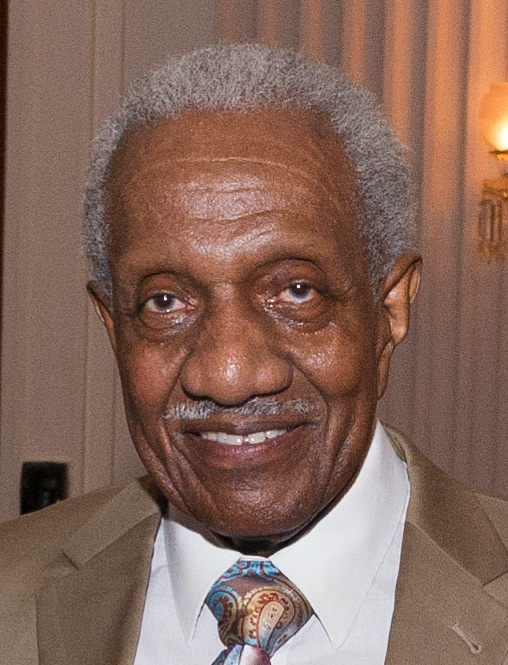
- Frederick D. Reese in 2016
- Born: Frederick Douglas Reese; November 28, 1929; Selma, Alabama, U.S.
- Died: April 5, 2018 (aged 88); Atlanta, Georgia, U.S.
- Education: Alabama State University
- Occupations: Teacher, minister, activist
- Years active: 1960–2018
- Movement: Selma Voting Rights Movement

Frederick Douglas Reese (November 28, 1929 – April 5, 2018) was an American civil rights activist, educator and minister from Selma, Alabama. Known as a member of Selma's "Courageous Eight", Reese was the president of the Dallas County Voters League (DCVL) when it invited the Southern Christian Leadership Conference and Martin Luther King Jr. to Selma to amplify the city's local voting rights campaign. This campaign eventually gave birth to the Selma to Montgomery marches, which later led to the passage of the Voting Rights Act.

Reese was also president of the Selma Teachers Association, and in January 1965 he mobilized Selma's teachers to march as a group for their right to vote.

Reese retired from teaching and from February 2015 and until his death in April 2018, he was active as a minister at Selma's Ebenezer Missionary Baptist Church.

== Early life ==
Reese was born in Selma, Alabama. In 1951, he graduated from Alabama State University, where he majored in math and science where he received a master's degree.

Reese spent nine years in Millers Ferry, Alabama, ending in 1960. This is where he began his teaching career, teaching science and serving as assistant principal. During his time in Millers Ferry, he met Alline Toulas Crossing. They couple married on June 28, 1953.

== Pastor (Servant Leader) ==
Reese became the pastor of Ebenezer Missionary Baptist Church, in Selma, Alabama on March 21, 1965. He accepted the responsibility of Pastor and joined the front line of the successful march known as the Selma to Montgomery march on the same day.

== Selma Voting Rights Movement ==
External videos
- “Eyes on the Prize; Interview with Frederick D. Reese” conducted in 1985 for the Eyes on the Prize documentary.

In 1960, Reese moved home to Selma, started teaching science and math at R. B. Hudson High School, and joined the Dallas County Voters League (DCVL), the major civil rights organization in Selma since the state of Alabama started actively suppressing the NAACP in 1956. Two years after joining the DCVL, he was elected its president.

In 1962, while Reese was a DCVL member, the organization encouraged Bernard Lafayette of the Student Nonviolent Coordinating Committee to come to Selma to assist in the voting rights struggle by educating black citizens about their right to vote.

As president of the DCVL, Reese signed and sent the DCVL's invitation to Martin Luther King Jr. and the Southern Christian Leadership Conference (SCLC) to come to Selma to lend their support to the voting rights campaign there. King and the SCLC agreed to come, and they started their public engagement in Selma's voting rights campaign on January 2, 1965, with a mass meeting in violation of an injunction against large gatherings.

On January 18, about 400 people marched on the county courthouse to register to vote; on January 19, the people marched again, and this time police violence towards DCVL's Amelia Boynton and the arrest of 67 marchers brought the movement to national headlines.

=== Teachers' March ===
In 1965, Reese held the simultaneous leadership positions of DCVL president and president of the Selma Teachers Association. The first act he made as the Teachers Association president was to sign a proclamation in the presence of the superintendent and assistant superintendent, declaring that teachers should register to vote. Reese even asked that the superintendent allow black teachers to use their free period during the school day to register to vote, though he knew it was an "abominable thing to ask" in that political and social climate. Reese and fellow teacher and DCVL member Margaret Moore challenged their colleagues, "How can we teach American civics if we ourselves cannot vote?"

On January 22, three days after Amelia Boynton's encounter with police, and three days before another demonstration in front of the county courthouse where Annie Lee Cooper (portrayed by Oprah Winfrey in the 2014 film Selma) had a violent encounter with Sheriff Jim Clark, Reese gathered 105 teachers—almost every black teacher in Selma—to march on the courthouse. The teachers climbed the steps but were barred from entering to register. They were pushed down the steps twice, the police jabbing them with nightsticks. Officials reportedly urged against the teachers' arrest, saying, "Don't arrest these people because what you going do with the 7,000 students that we have running around here when they go back to school Monday?" It was the first time in Civil Rights Movement that teachers in the South publicly marched as teachers; they were the largest black professional group in Dallas County, and their actions inspired involvement from their students and others who were unsure about participating in demonstrations.

=== Selma to Montgomery marches ===
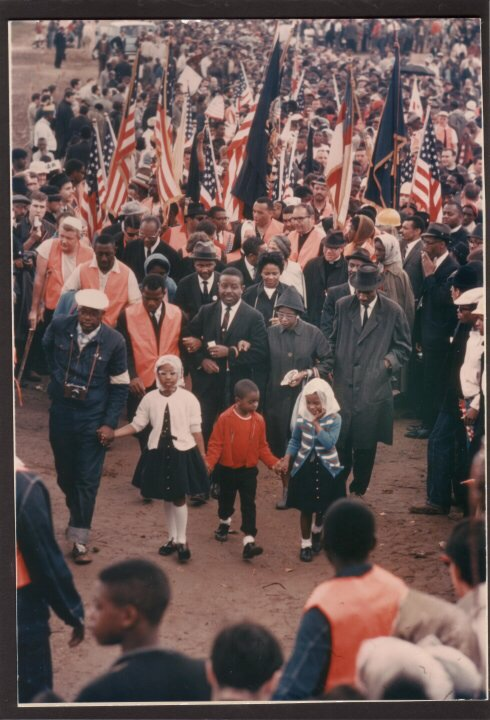
Reese in hat and coat, marching from Selma to Montgomery, behind and to the right of children

During the time the SCLC spent organizing and protesting in Selma, Reese coordinated meetings and often played the role of mediator when differences of opinion arose.

In photographs from the Selma to Montgomery marches, Reese is pictured in a dark suit, coat, and hat, most often in the front of the march with Martin Luther King Jr. and some of his closest associates.

Reese has been credited as the leader whose persistent efforts led to the Voting Rights Act. He has been given the title of Mr. Voting Rights by some. In the words of U.S. Congressman John Lewis, “I first met the Rev. Reese in 1963 on my first trip to Selma when I became the chair of the Student Nonviolent Coordinating Committee. He was one of the leaders of the local movement and became more of a leader during the whole effort to gain the [right to] vote in Selma. He was highly respected, and he welcomed us into Selma in our efforts to help the local movement.”

“The Rev. Reese’s involvement made it possible. He helped create the climate for the Voting Rights Act,” Lewis said. “People all over America and many people around the world knew him because he stood out as this nice, upright man. He didn’t make a lot of noise. He just did what he felt was his calling. He was consistent and persistent.”

== Selma City Councilman ==
Reese served as a city councilman in the City of Selma for 14 years. At one point, he became a mayoral candidate.

== In creative works ==
Reese was portrayed by E. Roger Mitchell in Ava DuVernay's 2014 film Selma and by Bob Banks in the 1999 film Selma, Lord, Selma.

== Honors and awards ==
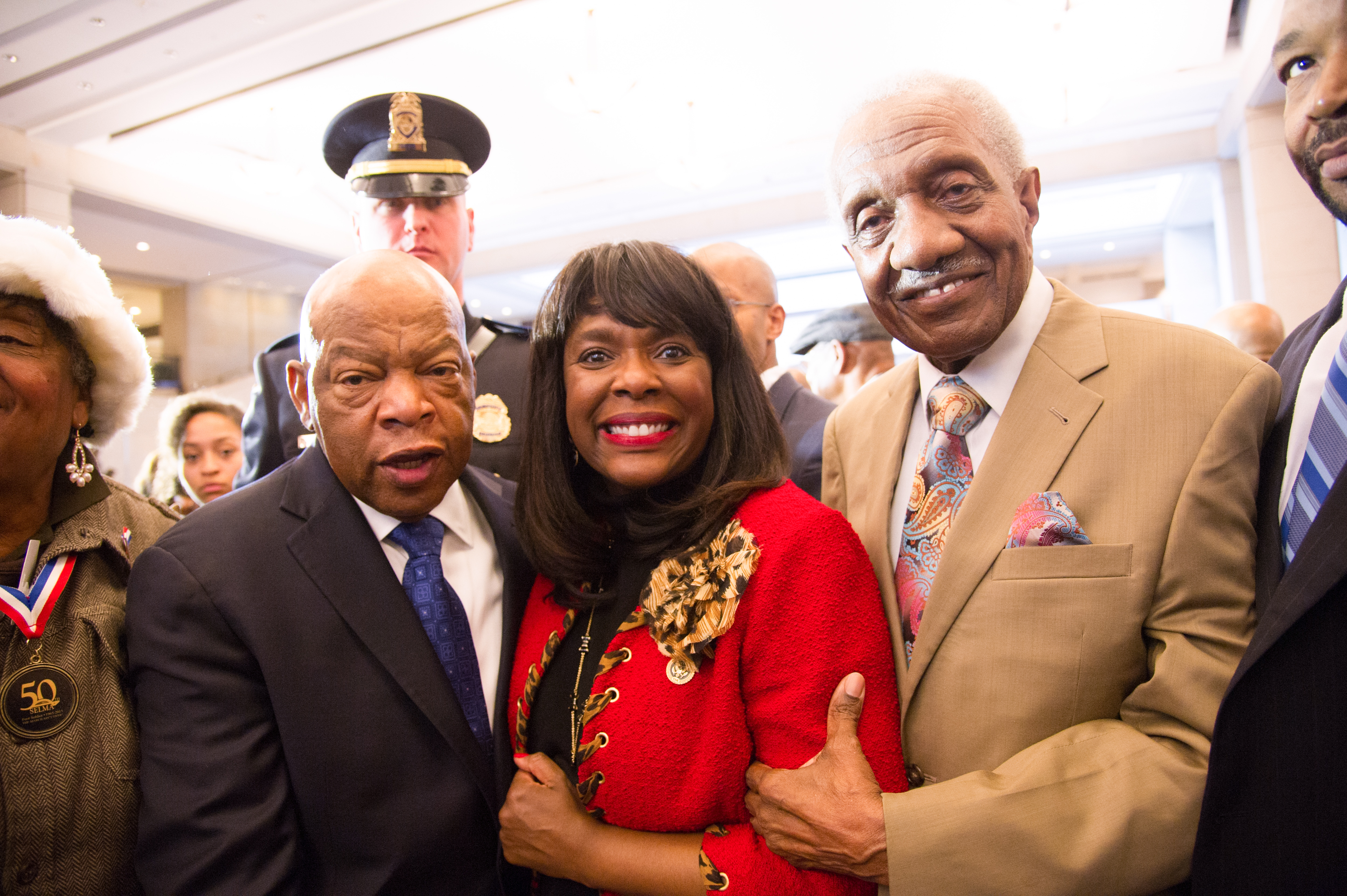
Frederick Reese with John Lewis and Terri Sewell at a 2016 Congressional Gold Medal Ceremony honoring the March on Selma.

April 27, 1999: The State of Alabama's House of Representatives unanimously passed Resolution # HJR 231, which honors Dr. F. D. Reese esteemed influence and impact as a pastor, educator, and civil rights leader. The Alabama Legislature's designated a portion of Highway 80 East from the Edmund Pettus Bridge (Selma, AL) proceeding three miles east as the Dr. Frederick D. Reese Parkway.

May 27, 2000: The City of Selma, Alabama dedicated and celebrated the renaming of the 3 mile stretch of *U.S. Highway 80 beginning at the Edmund Pettus Bridge to honor Dr. Frederick D. Reese. (*The historical location point where "Bloody Sunday" occurred, the pivot point of the Voting Rights Movement and gateway to the Selma to Montgomery March.)

In 2016, Reese and fellow Selma marcher John Lewis accepted Congressional Gold Medals on behalf of the Selma "foot soldiers."

== Death ==
Reese died of natural causes on April 5, 2018, in Atlanta at the age of 88.
