= Joseph Smitherman =

American politician (1929–2005)

Joe Smitherman

Mayor of Selma
- In office 1980–2000
- Preceded by: Carl Morgan Jr.
- Succeeded by: James Perkins Jr.
- In office 1964 – July 15, 1979
- Preceded by: Chris Heinz
- Succeeded by: Carl Morgan Jr.

Personal details
- Born: December 24, 1929 Alberta, Alabama, U.S.
- Died: September 11, 2005 (aged 75) Selma, Alabama, U.S.
- Party: Democratic
- Occupation: railroad brakeman

Military service
- Allegiance: United States of America
- Branch/service: United States Army
- Battles/wars: Korean War

Joseph Thomas Smitherman (December 24, 1929 – September 11, 2005) was an American politician who served more than 35 years as mayor of Selma, Alabama. He was in office during the Selma to Montgomery marches of the Civil Rights Movement. "He can do the reformed redneck better than anyone else," is a famous line about Joe Smitherman.

== Life and career ==
External videos
- “Eyes on the Prize; Interview with Joseph Smitherman” conducted in 1985 for the Eyes on the Prize documentary.

Smitherman was born in Alberta, Alabama. His family moved to Selma, where he graduated from high school. Smitherman worked as a railroad brakeman before joining the United States Army during the Korean War. Upon discharge, he opened a home appliance store. In 1960, he won a seat on the Selma City Council. He was elected mayor in 1964. He resigned in 1979 and was succeeded by Council President Carl Morgan (d. 2006). A year later he returned to office, defeating Mayor Morgan in a three-way race. He served five more terms until the 2000 mayoral elections, when he lost to James Perkins Jr., Selma's first African American mayor, who ran under the slogan "Joe's Got To Go".

In his early political career in the 1960s he was in favor of segregation, and controversially referred to Martin Luther King Jr. as "Martin Luther Coon" in a 1965 televised interview. He explained it as a slip of the tongue. After African Americans gained voting rights, he appointed several African Americans officials to high municipal offices. He gained enough support among the African American population to remain in office. He proudly referred to his significant support in the African American community.

At the time of the Selma march he was considered a moderate and not close to Judge James Hare or to Sheriff Jim Clark, who ordered and carried out the police operation against marchers. Smitherman had ordered city police not to use force against the protesters, but the order was disobeyed by the safety director, Wilson Baker. Before the marches, he had rejected the possibility of forming a biracial reconciliation committee.

He later stated that he had always been racially tolerant and that it was only the political climate around him that required him to work against the civil rights movement but that he had really been in favor of change.

== Death ==
At the time of his death, Smitherman was recuperating from hip surgery and had heart problems. The Joseph T. Smitherman Historic Building in Selma is named in his honor.

Preceded by Chris Heinz	Mayor of Selma, Alabama; 1964–July 15, 1979	Succeeded by Carl Morgan Jr.
Preceded by Carl Morgan Jr.	Mayor of Selma, Alabama; 1980–2000	Succeeded by James Perkins Jr.
