= Joseph T. Smitherman Historic Building =

- Dallas County Courthouse
- U.S. National Register of Historic Places
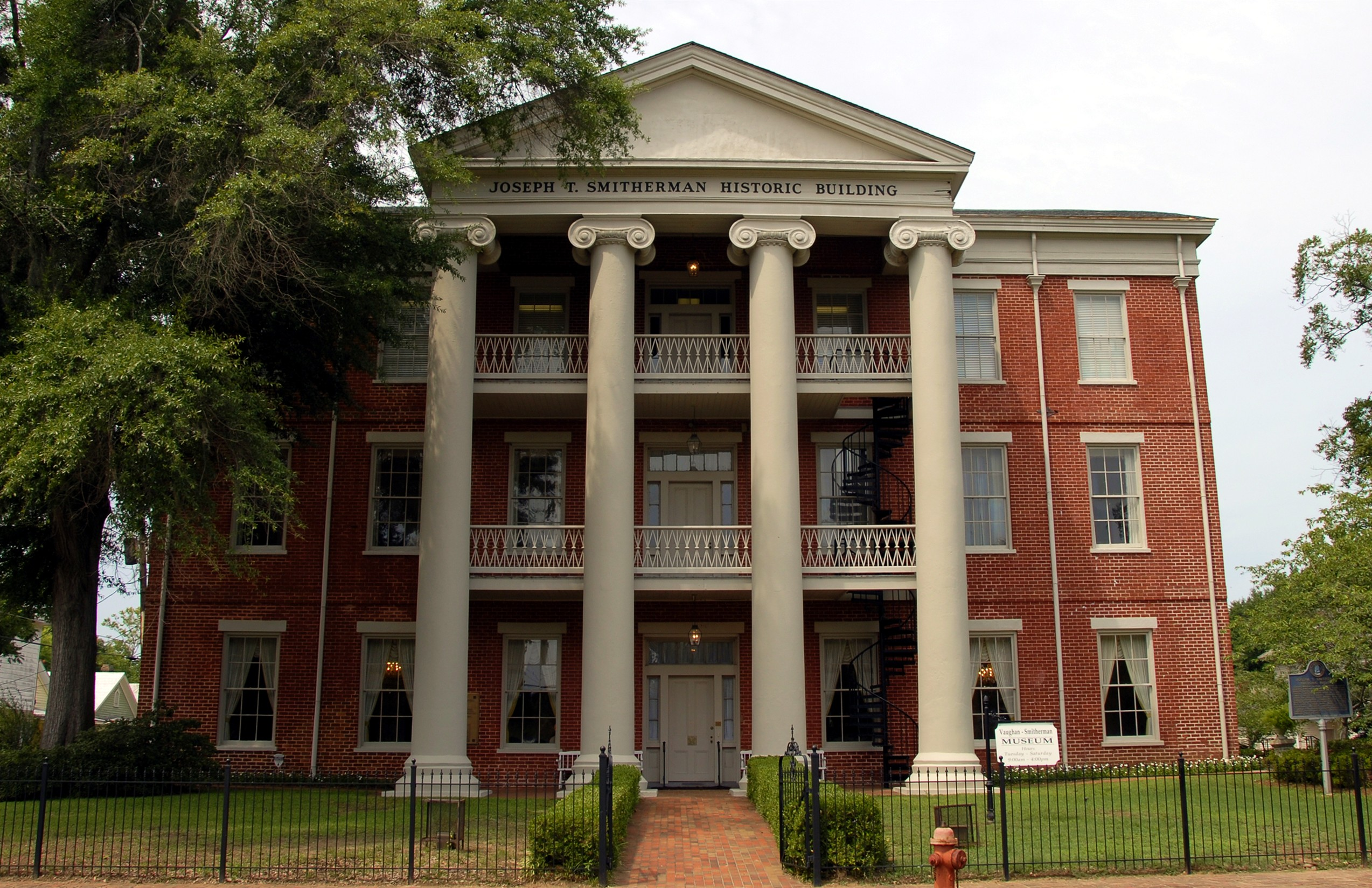
- Joseph T. Smitherman Historic Building, the former Dallas County Courthouse, in 2009

- Location within Alabama Location within the United States
- Location: 109 Union St., Selma, Alabama
- Coordinates: 32°24′18″N 87°1′33″W
- Area: 1 acre (0.40 ha)
- Built: 1847
- Architectural style: Greek Revival
- NRHP reference No.: 75000310
- Added to NRHP: June 20, 1975

The Joseph T. Smitherman Historic Building, also known by a variety of other names throughout its history, is a historic Greek Revival building in Selma, Alabama, United States. Completed in 1847, it has served many functions in the more than 160 years of its existence. The building was added to the National Register of Historic Places on June 20, 1975, due to its architectural and historical significance. It currently houses the Vaughan-Smitherman Museum, a museum depicting Selma's history.

== History ==
The building was completed by the Selma Fraternal Lodge No. 27 of the Free and Accepted Masons in 1847. The organization had it built at a cost of $15,000 to serve as a school for orphans and the children of indigent Masons. It first opened its doors in October 1848 as the Central Masonic Institute. The school was not a success, and within a few years the mortgage on the property was lost by the Masons. The structure was next used as a Confederate hospital during the American Civil War. It survived the Battle of Selma near the end of the war and served as a Freedman's Bureau Hospital for a short time following it. It was then purchased by local civic leaders in an effort to lure the Dallas county seat from Cahaba to Selma. The effort was successful, with Selma becoming the seat of government for the county in 1866. The building served as the Dallas County Courthouse until 1902, when a new courthouse was built at the corner of Alabama Avenue and Lauderdale Street.

The trustees of the Henry W. Vaughan estate purchased the building for $5,025 in 1904 and leased the former courthouse to a new school, the Selma Military Institute. The military school used the building until 1908, when it moved to what is now the administration building at the United Methodist Children's Home on North Broad Street. The trustees then converted the space into a new hospital, Vaughan Memorial Hospital, in 1911. The hospital occupied the building until 1960, when a new hospital building was completed on West Dallas Avenue. The building sat vacant and neglected until 1969, when the City of Selma, Dallas County, and the Selma Housing Authority purchased it for $82,500. This was done under the leadership of Joseph T. Smitherman, the mayor of Selma at the time. The facility reopened as the Historic and Civic Building on May 16, 1971. It was renamed in honor of Smitherman by the Selma City Council in 1979, for his role in preserving and restoring the building.

== Architecture ==
The three-story red brick structure is built in the Greek Revival-style that was popular at the time of its construction. It is most notable for its centrally placed tetrastyle portico, utilizing monumental Ionic columns. The exposed brickwork of the seven bay facade utilizes the stretcher bond, with a belt course between each floor. The pedimented portico covers the three central bays, with balconies at each upper level stretching the width and depth of the covered area. The wrought iron balcony railings utilize a design with an open diamond pattern, also known as a crowfoot baluster.

== Vaughan-Smitherman Museum ==
The building is now home to the Vaughan-Smitherman Museum. The first floor contains the museum's Civil War collection and documents relating to slavery. The second is dedicated to a political collection. The third floor is set up as a hospital, as it may have appeared while in use as Vaughan Memorial Hospital. Additionally, the museum has mid-19th century antique furniture, a collection of Native American artifacts, meeting rooms for clubs and civic groups, and parlors for social events.

== See also ==
- National Register of Historic Places listings in Dallas County, Alabama
