= National Voting Rights Museum =

Civil rights movement museum in Selma, Alabama

Coordinates: 32.4025°N 87.0173°W

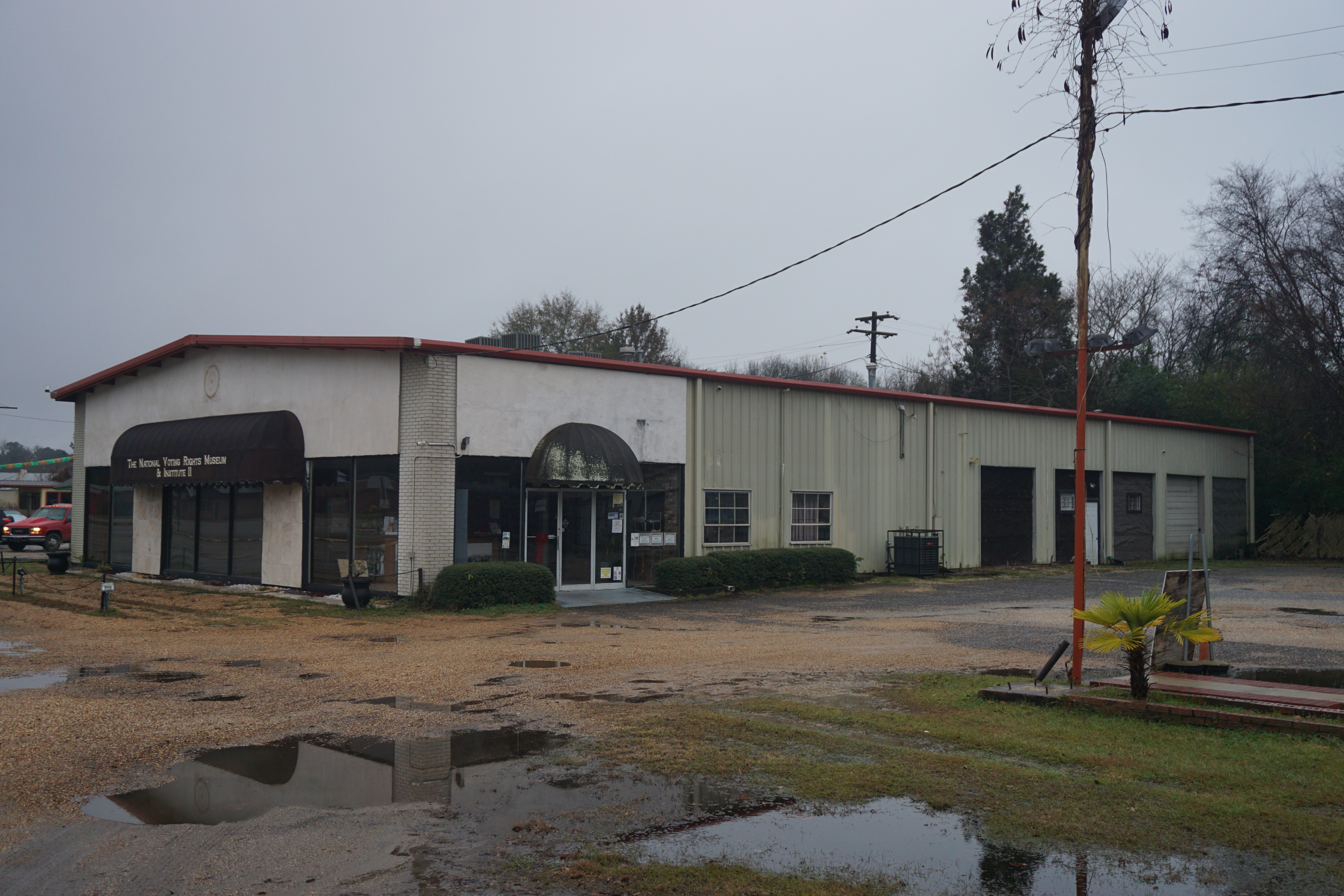
National Voting Rights Museum and Institute

The National Voting Rights Museum and Institute, established in 1991 and opened in 1993, is an American museum in Selma, Alabama, which honors, chronicles, collects, archives, and displays the artifacts and testimony of the activists who participated in the events leading up to and including the 1965 Selma to Montgomery marches, and passage of the 1965 Voting Rights Act, as well as those who worked for the African-American Voting Rights and Women's Suffrage movements. As the museum describes in its mission statement, it recognizes other people, events, and actions which furthered America's Right to Vote since "the Founding Fathers first planted the seeds of democracy in 1776." The museum was founded by Faya Ora Rose Touré and Marie Foster.

It is located near the Edmund Pettus Bridge. On this bridge on March 7, 1965, voting rights marchers who left the city for a planned walk to Montgomery were beaten and clubbed by Dallas County posse and Alabama State Troopers, in what became known as "Bloody Sunday". They had passed into the county on a planned walk of 54 miles to Montgomery, Alabama's state capital. This treatment was nationally televised and covered by major media, arousing national outrage. After gaining federal protection from President Lyndon B. Johnson and a federal court order protecting their right to march, thousands of people left Selma on March 21, reaching Montgomery several days later. By then, they had been joined by thousands more, black and white, and 25,000 marchers entered the state capital to press for protection of constitutional voting rights. Later that summer the Voting Rights Act of 1965, introduced by the Johnson administration, was passed by Congress and signed by the president.

== Exhibits ==
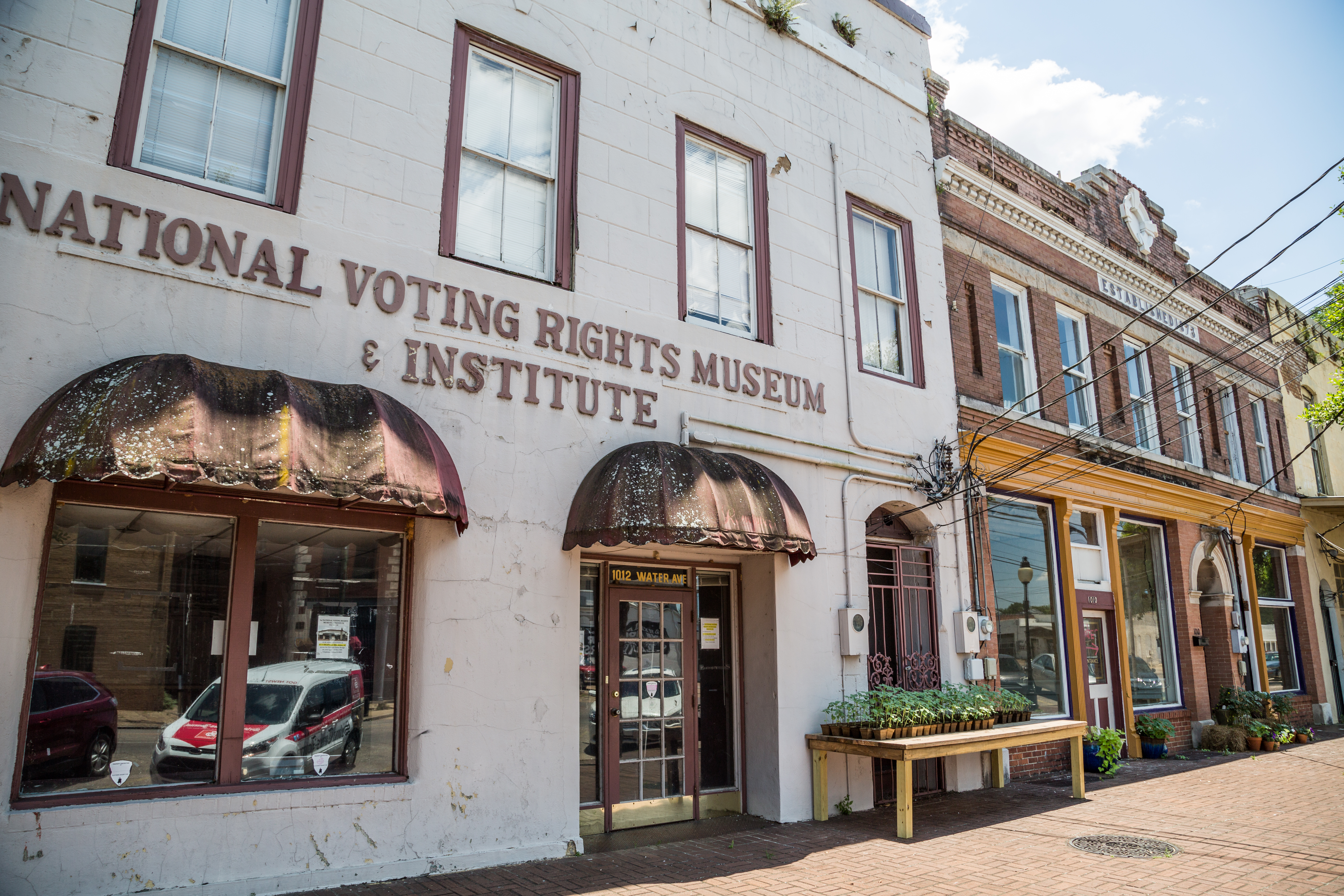
The former location of the museum.

The museum's several rooms and exhibit areas include the "Footprints to Freedom" room, which features molded cast-footprints of some of the activists who participated in the Selma to Montgomery marches; a "Women's Suffrage Room", honoring the contributions of African-American and other women who secured women's voting rights in the U.S.; the "Selma Room", also known as the "Marie Foster" room, where voting records, clothes worn by people beaten during the march, and other artifacts of these social movements are displayed; and a room where people who participated in the 1960s marches can leave personal messages and chronicle their memories. The museum also features a large blow-up of a portion of an iconic photograph taken on the Selma to Montgomery march by Look magazine photographer James Karales.

== See also ==
- Dr. Martin Luther King's 1957 Give Us the Ballot speech
- Voting rights in the United States
- Birmingham Civil Rights Institute
- Civil rights movement in popular culture
- National Civil Rights Museum
- Woman Suffrage Procession
- Declaration of Sentiments
- Seneca Falls Convention
- Women's suffrage in the United States
