= Dallas County Voters League =

Local organization in Dallas County, Alabama,

The Dallas County Voters League (DCVL) was a local organization in Dallas County, Alabama, which contains the city of Selma, that sought to register black voters during the late 1950s and early 1960s.

The organization was founded in the 1920s by Charles J. Adams, a postal service employee and civil rights organizer who was also the local representative of the NAACP. After he moved to Detroit, he was replaced by Sam Boynton, the husband of Amelia Boynton.

The DCVL was later revived by an eight-member steering committee, known as the "Courageous Eight,": Amelia Boynton, Ulysses S. Blackmon, James E. Gildersleeve, Frederick D. Reese, Rev. John D. Hunter, Rev. Henry Shannon, Earnest Doyle, and Marie Foster. These members tried to register black citizens during the late 1950s and early 1960s, but their efforts were blocked by state and local officials, the White Citizens' Council, and the Ku Klux Klan. In 1962, Frederick D. Reese was elected president of DCVL.

Bernard Lafayette, along with his wife Colia Liddel Lafayette, was sent to Selma by the Student Nonviolent Coordinating Committee (SNCC) to campaign for the registration of black voters in the area in February 1963. He met the representatives of the DCVL, who impressed him so much that he recommended the organization to be funded. In July 1963, demonstrations and sit-ins were being coordinated by the SNCC and the DCVL. On October 7, 1963, one of two days during the month when residents were allowed to go to the courthouse to apply to register to vote, the SNCC and the DCVL mobilized more than 300 blacks from Dallas County to line up at the voter registration office in what was called a "Freedom Day".

Even when the Civil Rights Act of 1964 was passed, legally ending the practice of segregation, they still found difficulty in getting any black voters registered. At the time, only 2.2 percent of African-Americans were registered to vote in Dallas County, though even this figure owed largely to the continuous work of the DCVL.

In late 1964, they received the help of the Southern Christian Leadership Conference, led by Martin Luther King Jr. In 1965, the organization worked in collaboration with the SNCC and the SCLC to organize the Selma to Montgomery marches.

After SCLC and King launched the 1965 Selma Voting Rights Campaign on January 2, 1965, schoolteacher Frederick Reese, also president of the DCVL, convinced his fellow teachers to join an attempt to register to vote in mass. They made three attempts on January 22 to climb the steps of the county courthouse and were beaten back each time. Since previous attempts to register had been made largely by blue-collar workers and students, this marked the first attempt in Dallas County by local educated blacks to register in large numbers.

The first march from Selma to Montgomery was attempted on March 7, 1965. Bloody Sunday was initiated by SCLC member James Bevel, and organized by Bevel, Amelia Boynton, and others. When the marchers crossed the bridge they were attacked by deputies of the county sheriff Jim Clark and Alabama State Troopers, and Amelia Boynton was beaten and left unconscious in the street. The picture of her unconscious figure was widely publicized and helped fuel outrage at the treatment of the marchers.

Other members of the DCVL were Annie Lee Cooper, Louis Lloyd Anderson (pastor of Tabernacle Church), and J. L. Chestnut. Gildersleeve was also the president of DCVL.
