= Jim Clark (sheriff) =

American sheriff (1922–2007)

Sheriff of Dallas County, Alabama, U.S.
- In office 1955–1966
- Appointed by: Jim Folsom
- Succeeded by: Wilson Baker

Personal details
- Born: James Gardner Clark, Jr. September 17, 1922 Alabama, U.S.
- Died: June 4, 2007 (aged 84) Elba, Alabama, U.S.
- Party: Democratic
- Spouse: Louise (divorced)
- Children: 5

James Gardner Clark Jr. (September 17, 1922 – June 4, 2007) was the sheriff of Dallas County, Alabama, United States, from 1955 to 1966. He was one of the officials responsible for the violent arrests of civil rights protestors during the Selma to Montgomery marches of 1965, and is remembered as a racist whose brutal tactics included using cattle prods against unarmed civil rights supporters.

== Early life and family ==
Jim Clark was born in Alabama, the son of Ettie Lee and James Gardner Clark. He served with the U.S. Army Air Force in the Aleutian Islands during World War II. Clark was a cattle rancher when his lifelong friend, Alabama Governor Jim Folsom, appointed him as sheriff in 1955. He married and later divorced Louise Clark, with whom he had five children, Jimmy Clark, Jeff Clark, Johnny Clark, Joanna Clark Miller and Jan Clark Buster.

== Dallas County Sheriff (1955–1966) ==
In 1964 and 1965, the Student Nonviolent Coordinating Committee (SNCC) engaged in a voting drive in Dallas County, of which Selma was the county seat. As sheriff of Dallas County, Clark vocally opposed racial integration, wearing a button reading "Never" [integrate]. He wore military style clothing and carried a cattle prod in addition to his pistol and club.

In response to the voting drive, Clark recruited a horse mounted posse of Ku Klux Klan members and supporters. Together with the highway patrolmen of Albert J. Lingo, the posse was intended to "operate ... as a mobile anti-civil rights force", and appeared at several Alabama towns outside of Clark's jurisdiction to assault and threaten civil rights workers.

In Selma, the SNCC campaign was met with violence and intimidation by Clark, who waited at the entrance to the county courthouse, beating and arresting registrants at the slightest provocation. At one point, Clark arrested around 300 students who were holding a silent protest outside the courthouse, force-marching them with cattle prods to a detention center three miles away. At another point he was punched in the jaw and knocked down by a demonstrator, Annie Lee Cooper, whom he was trying to make go home by poking her in the neck with either a nightstick or a cattle prod after she had stood for hours at the courthouse in an attempt to register to vote. By 1965, only 300 of the city's 15,000 potential black voters were registered.

These actions led to a widespread comparison of Clark to Eugene "Bull" Connor, and to James Baldwin saying of Clark:

I suggest that what has happened to the white Southerner is in some ways much worse than what has happened to the Negroes there ... One has to assume that he is a man like me, but he does not know what drives him to use the club, to menace with a gun, and to use a cattle prod against a woman's breasts ... Their moral lives have been destroyed by a plague called color.

After The New York Times and The Washington Post published photos of an SCLC protest at which Clark wielded a club and pushed Amelia Boynton to the ground, Ralph Abernathy nominated him for honorary membership in the Dallas County Voters League, a local voting rights organization, for "publicity services rendered".

== Bloody Sunday ==
On February 18, 1965, in Marion, Alabama, a peaceful protest march was met by Alabama state patrolmen, who beat the protesters after street lights suddenly went out. A young protester, Jimmie Lee Jackson, attempted to protect his mother and octogenarian grandfather from police beating, and was shot in the stomach by Corporal James Bonard Fowler of the highway patrol. Jackson died eight days later of his injuries. Clark was present on the police side at Marion, despite it being outside his jurisdiction.

In response to the failed registration campaign, and as a direct response to the killing of Jackson, James Bevel initiated, called for, and organized a march from Selma to Montgomery.

On March 7, 1965, around 600 protesters left Selma. Clark's officers and posse joined with Alabama state troopers in attacking the protesters on the Edmund Pettus Bridge on the outskirts of Selma in an event that came to be known as "Bloody Sunday", resulting in the hospitalization of over 60 protesters. That evening, ABC interrupted the television premiere of Judgment at Nuremberg to show scenes of the violence to around 48 million Americans. This was a critical event in the United States Congress passing the Voting Rights Act.

In an obituary, The Washington Post noted:

Mr. Clark's most visible moment came March 7, 1965, at the start of a peaceful voting rights march from Selma to the capital city of Montgomery.

Mr. Clark and his men were stationed near Selma's Edmund Pettus Bridge. Alabama State Trooper John Cloud ordered the hundreds of marchers to disperse. When they did not, Mr. Clark commanded his mounted "posse" to charge into the crowd. Tear gas heightened the chaos, and protesters were beaten.

Captured on national television, the Bloody Sunday incident spurred widespread revulsion. Even Gov. George C. Wallace, who had earlier sparked a national showdown over a refusal to integrate public schools, reprimanded the state troopers and Mr. Clark.

== Views on Martin Luther King, Jr. ==
On July 22, 1965, the Texarkana, Texas local branch of the Citizen's Council, a white supremacist organization, sponsored Clark's appearance as a guest at their meeting. During Clark's talk to the group, he recalled of Bloody Sunday, "they sent the so-called preachers." He went on to say of Martin Luther King Jr., "we decided to treat him like the common yellow cur dog that he is."

== Loss of sheriff's office ==
Mayor of Selma Joseph Smitherman and Wilson Baker wanted to blunt the force of the campaign by exercising restraint but the voter registration offices were Clark's responsibility. In the 1966 election, following the passage of the Voting Rights Act of 1965, Wilson Baker defeated Clark's write-in campaign, in part because the Act allowed many African-Americans to register to vote and cast ballots against Clark. According to The New York Times the day after the election, "The two men had previously met in the Democratic primary race and Mr. Baker was the winner." Clark attempted to have suppressed 1,600 ballots cast for his opponent due to "irregularities", but court orders placed the votes back on record.

== Later life and death ==
Following his defeat, Clark sold mobile homes. He also became involved in a number of dubious enterprises. These included being a broker for 'the Tangible Risk Insurance Company' in Birmingham, which got him indicted with eight other men for mail fraud, to which he pleaded no contest. Then, in 1973, he served in North Carolina as general manager of the Pinehurst Mortgage & Loan Company, which turned out to be a loan-sharking outfit; the company eventually accused Clark of embezzlement but the company itself folded in the face of securities law enforcement. By 1976 Clark was back in Alabama as an officer of 'International Coal & Mining', but one of his partners was prosecuted for fraud and embezzlement. In 1978, a federal grand jury in Montgomery indicted Clark on charges of conspiring to smuggle three tons of marijuana from Colombia. Clark was sentenced to two years in prison and ended up serving nine months. In 2006, he told the Montgomery Advertiser that concerning his actions during the civil rights movement, "Basically, I'd do the same thing today if I had to do it all over again." He died at Elba Nursing and Rehabilitation Center in Elba, Alabama, on June 4, 2007, from a stroke and a heart condition. Amelia Boynton Robinson, whom Clark had arrested in 1965, attended his funeral.
