= Selma, Alabama =

City in Dallas County, Alabama, United States

- City
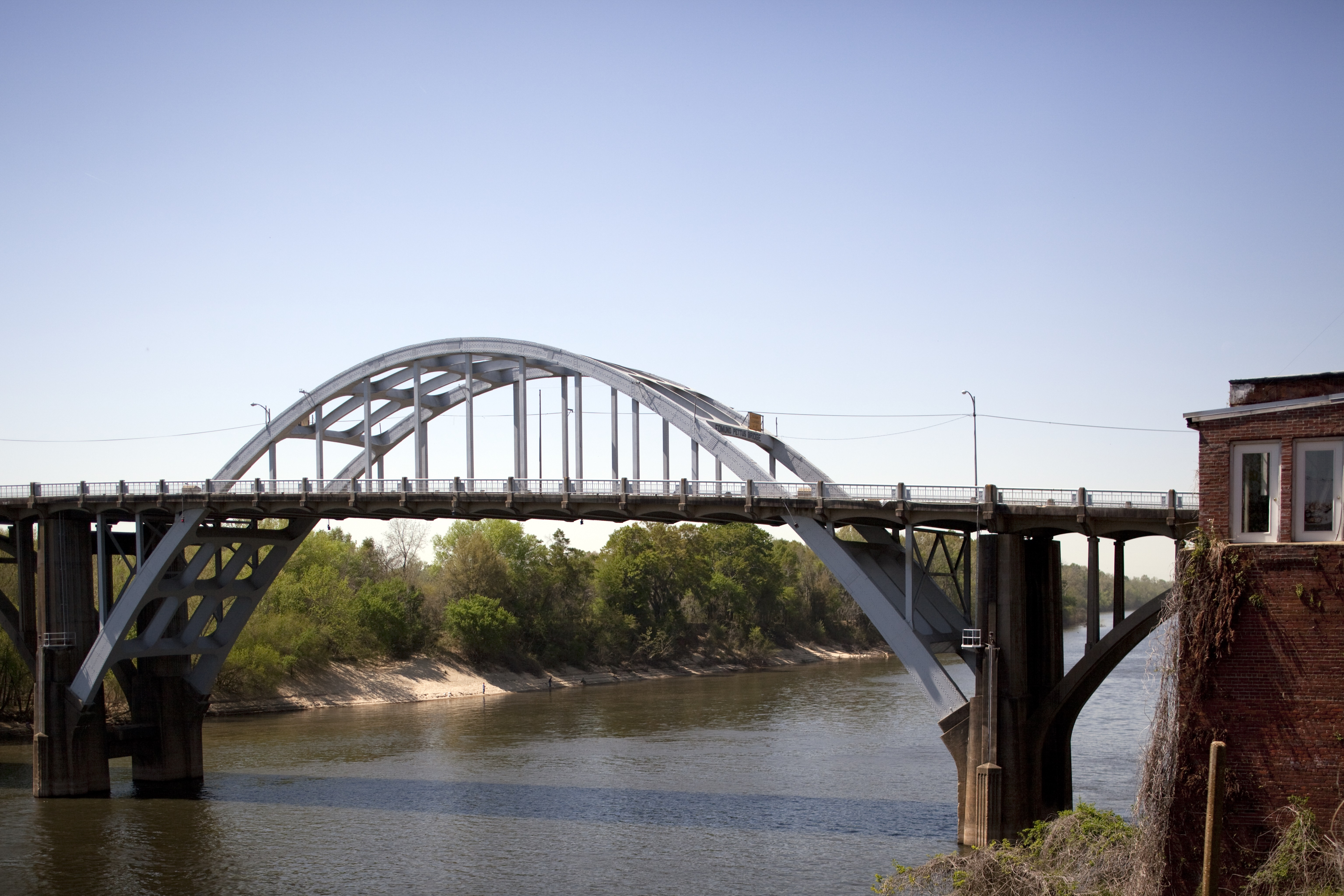
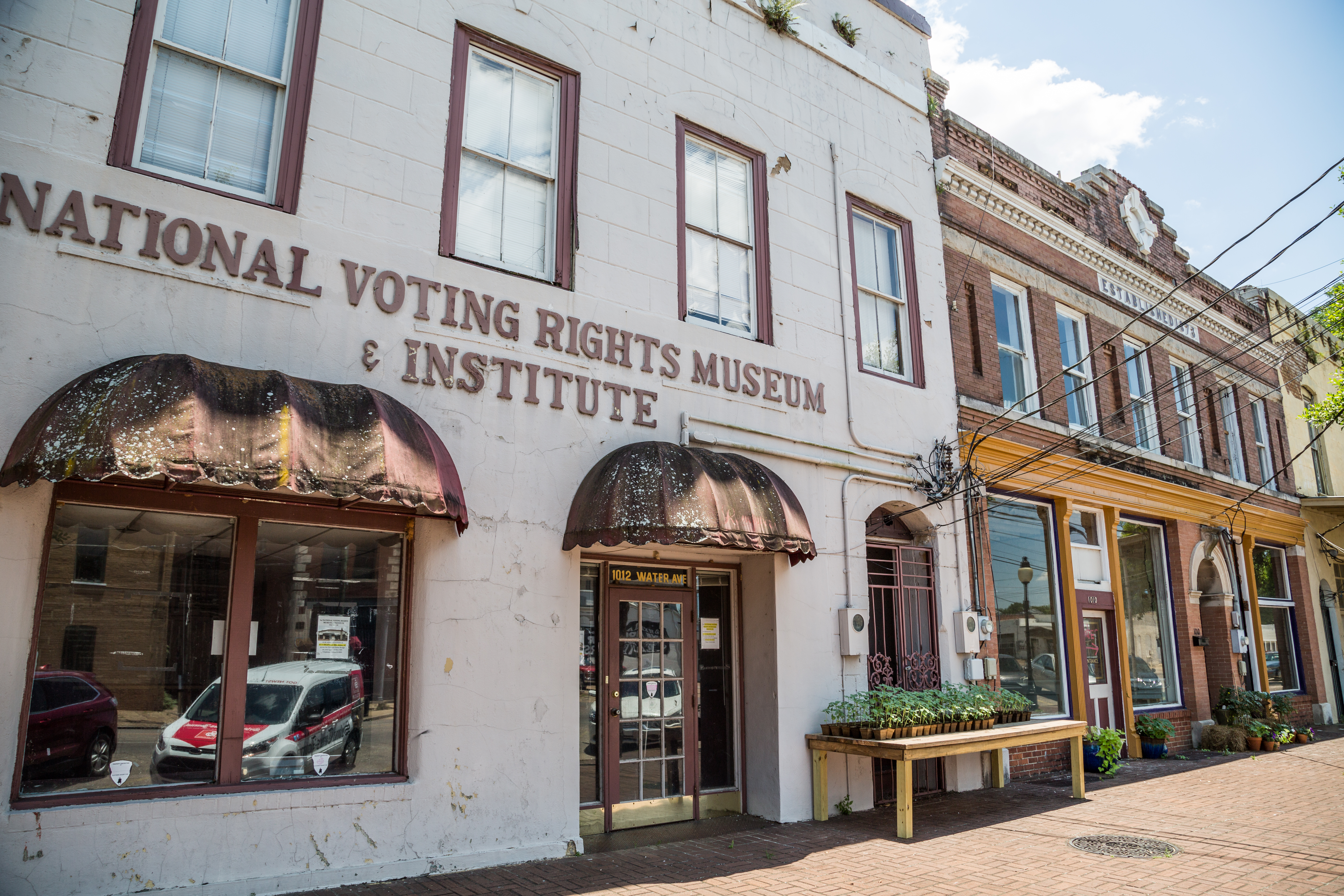
- St. James Hotel and Water Avenue Edmund Pettus Bridge National Voting Rights Museum and Institute

- Flag Seal
- Mottoes: Queen City of the Black Belt, Butterfly Capital of Alabama
- Location of Selma, Alabama
- Interactive map of Selma
- Coordinates: 32°24′59″N 87°01′29″W
- Country: United States
- State: Alabama
- County: Dallas
- Founded: 1815
- Incorporated: December 4, 1820
- Named for: The Songs of Selma

Government
  - Type: Mayor–Council
  - Mayor: Johnny E. Moss (D)
  - Council President: Kennard Randolph
  - Councilmembers: Troy Harvill; Christie Thomas; Clay Carmichael; Lesia James; Nadine Sturdivant; Ashley Ervin; Jannie Thomas; Michael Johnson
  - Administrative assistant: Carneetie Ellison

Area
  - Total: 14.403 sq mi (37.304 km^{2})
  - Land: 13.809 sq mi (35.766 km^{2})
  - Water: 0.593 sq mi (1.537 km^{2})
- Elevation: 118 ft (36 m)

Population (2020)
  - Total: 17,971
  - Estimate (2025): 15,934
  - Density: 1,206.9/sq mi (466.0/km^{2})
- Demonym: Selmarian
- Time zone: UTC–6 (Central (CST))
  - Summer (DST): UTC–5 (CDT)
- ZIP Codes: 36701, 36702, 36703
- Area code: 334
- FIPS code: 01-69120
- GNIS feature ID: 2405441
- Sales tax: 10.0%
- Website: selma-al.gov

Selma is a city in and the county seat of Dallas County, in the Black Belt region of south central Alabama and extending to the west. Located on the banks of the Alabama River, the city has a population of 17,971 as of the 2020 census. About 80% of the population is African-American.

Selma was a trading center and market town during the antebellum years of King Cotton in the South. It was also an important armaments-manufacturing and iron shipbuilding center for the Confederacy, as well as providing a hospital converted from a Masonic university, during the Civil War, surrounded by miles of earthen fortifications. The Confederate forces were defeated during the Battle of Selma, in the final full month of the war.

In modern times, the city is best known for the 1960s civil rights movement and the Selma to Montgomery marches, beginning with "Bloody Sunday" in March 1965, when unarmed peaceful protesters were assaulted by county and state highway police.

By the end of March 1965, an estimated 25,000 people entered Montgomery to press for voting rights. This activism generated national attention for social justice. That summer, the Voting Rights Act of 1965 was passed by Congress to authorize federal oversight and enforcement of constitutional rights of all American citizens.

Due to agriculture and industry decline, Selma has lost about a third of its peak population since the 1960s. The city is focusing on heritage tourism, to build on its role as a major influence in civil rights and desegregation.

Selma is one of Alabama's poorest cities, with an average income of $35,500, which is 30% less than the state average. One in every three residents in Selma lives below the state poverty line.

== History ==
Before discovery and settlement by Europeans, the area of present-day Selma had been inhabited for thousands of years by various warring tribes of Native Americans. The Europeans encountered the historic Native American people known as the Muscogee (also known as the Creek), who had been in the area for hundreds of years.

French explorers and colonists were the first Europeans to explore this area. In 1732, they recorded the site of present-day Selma as Écor Bienville. Later Anglo-Americans called it the Moore's Bluff settlement. Selma was incorporated in 1820. The city was planned and named as Selma by William R. King, a politician and planter from North Carolina who was a future vice president of the United States. The name, meaning 'high seat' or 'throne', came from the Ossianic poem The Songs of Selma by Scottish poet James Macpherson.

=== Selma during the Civil War ===
During the Civil War, Selma was one of the South's main military manufacturing centers, producing many supplies and munitions, and building Confederate warships such as the ironclad Tennessee. The Selma iron works and foundry, where a young William Kehoe made bullets, was considered the second-most important source of weaponry for the South, after the Tredegar Iron Works in Richmond, Virginia. Half the cannon and two thirds of the fixed ammunition used by the Confederacy in the last two years of the war were made there. This strategic concentration of manufacturing capabilities eventually made Selma a target of Union raids into Alabama late in the Civil War.

Because of its military importance, Selma had been fortified by three miles of earthworks that ran in a semicircle around the city. They were anchored on the north and south by the Alabama River. The works had been built two years earlier, and while neglected for the most part since, were still formidable. They were 8 to 12 feet (2.4 to 3.7 m) high, 15 feet (4.6 m) thick at the base, with a ditch 4 feet (1.2 m) wide and 5 feet (1.5 m) deep along the front. In front of this was a 5 feet (1.5 m)-high picket fence of heavy posts planted in the ground and sharpened at the top. At prominent positions, earthen forts were built with artillery in position to cover the ground over which an assault would have to be made.

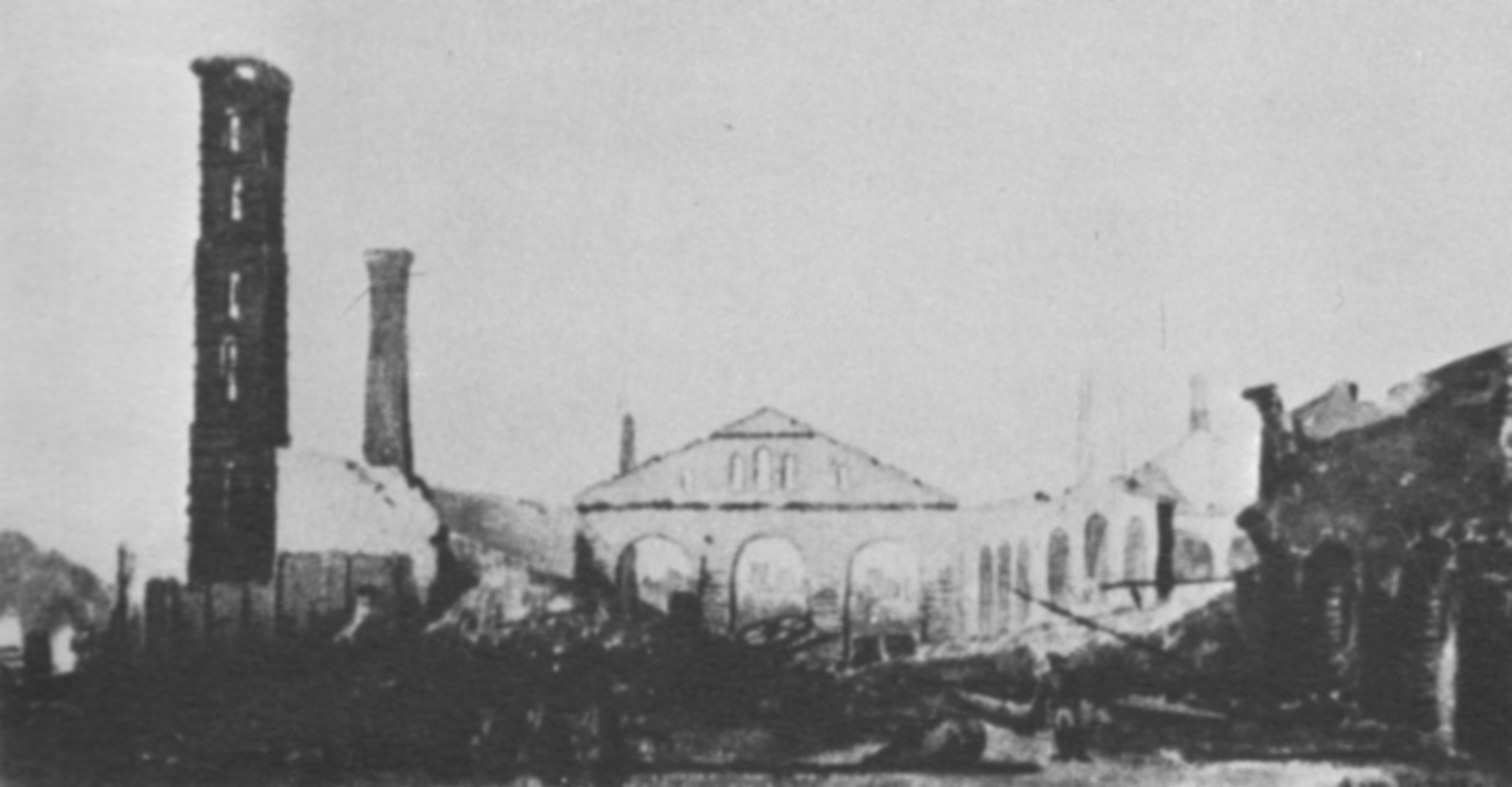
Ruins of the Confederate States Naval Foundry at Selma in 1865

The North had learned of the importance of Selma to the Confederate military, and the US military planned to take the city. Gen. William Tecumseh Sherman first made an effort to reach it, but after advancing from the west as far as Meridian, Mississippi, within 107 miles (172 km) of Selma, his forces retreated back to the Mississippi River. Gen. Benjamin Grierson, invading with a cavalry force from Memphis, Tennessee, was intercepted and returned. Gen. Rousseau made a dash in the direction of Selma, but was misled by his guides and struck the railroad forty miles east of Montgomery.

==== Battle of Selma ====
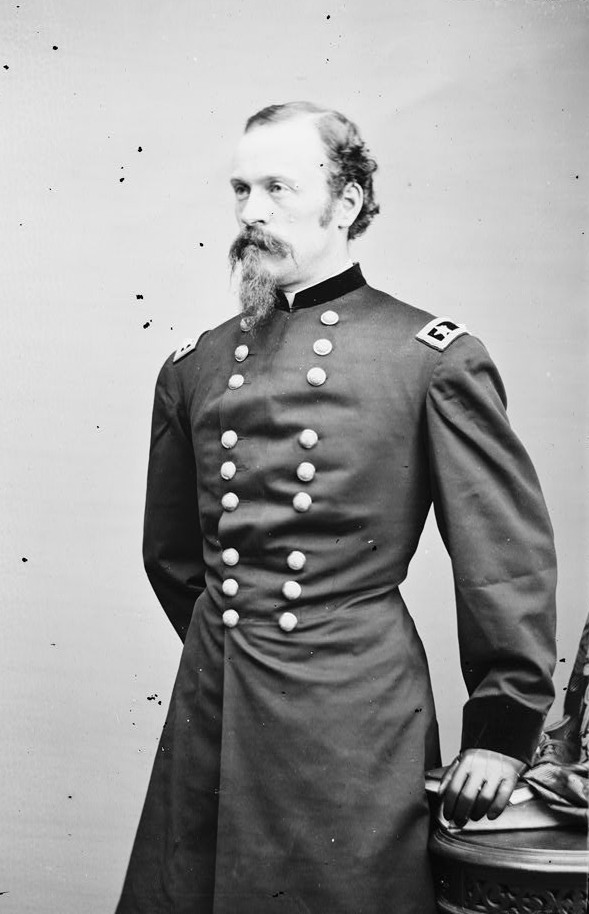
Union General James H. Wilson

On March 30, 1865, Union General James H. Wilson detached Gen. John T. Croxton's brigade to destroy all Confederate property at Tuscaloosa. Wilson's forces captured a Confederate courier, who was found to be carrying dispatches from Confederate General Nathan Bedford Forrest describing his scattered forces. Wilson sent a brigade to destroy the bridge across the Cahaba River at Centreville, which cut off most of Forrest's reinforcements from reaching the area. He began a running fight with Forrest's forces that did not end until after the fall of Selma.

On the afternoon of April 1, opening what would be the final full month of the war, and after skirmishing all morning, Wilson's advanced guard ran into Forrest's line of battle at Ebenezer Church, where the Randolph Road intersected the main Selma road. Forrest had hoped to bring his entire force to bear on Wilson. Delays caused by flooding, plus earlier contact with the enemy, resulted in Forrest's mustering fewer than 2,000 men, many of whom were not war veterans but home militia consisting of old men and young boys.

The outnumbered and outgunned Confederates fought for more than an hour as reinforcements of Union cavalry and artillery were deployed. Forrest was wounded by a saber-wielding Union captain, whom he shot and killed with his revolver. Finally, a Union cavalry charge broke the Confederate militia, causing Forrest to be flanked on his right. He was forced to retreat.

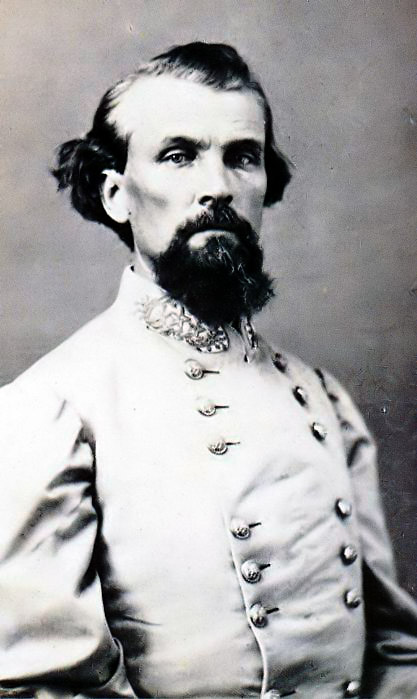
Confederate General Nathan B. Forrest

Early the next morning, Forrest reached Selma; he advised Gen. Richard Taylor, departmental commander, to leave the city. Taylor did so after giving Forrest command of the defense. Selma was protected by fortifications that circled much of the city; it was protected on the north and south by the Alabama River. The wall was high and deep, surrounded by a ditch and picket fence. Earthen forts were built to cover the grounds with artillery fire.

Forrest's defenders consisted of his Tennessee escort company, McCullough's Missouri Regiment, Crossland's Kentucky Brigade, Roddey's Alabama Brigade, Frank Armstrong's Mississippi Brigade, General Daniel W. Adams' state reserves, and the citizens of Selma who were "volunteered" to man the works. Altogether this force numbered less than 4,000. As the Selma fortifications were built to be defended by 20,000 men, Forrest's soldiers had to stand 10 to 12 feet (3.7 m) apart to try to cover the works.

Wilson's force arrived in front of the Selma fortifications at 2 pm. He had placed Gen. Eli Long's Division across the Summerfield Road with the Chicago Board of Trade Battery in support. Gen. Emory Upton's Division was placed across the Range Line Road with Battery I, 4th US Artillery in support. Altogether Wilson had 9,000 troops available for the assault.

The Federal commander's plan was for Upton to send in a 300-man detachment after dark to cross the swamp on the Confederate right; enter the works, and begin a flanking movement toward the center moving along the line of fortifications. A single gun from Upton's artillery would signal the attack to be undertaken by the entire Federal Corps.

At 5 pm, however, Gen. Eli Long's ammunition train in the rear was attacked by advance elements of Forrest's scattered forces approaching Selma. Both Long and Upton had positioned significant numbers of troops in their rear for just such an event. But, Long decided to begin his assault against the Selma fortifications to neutralize the enemy attack in his rear.

Long's troops attacked in a single rank in three main lines, dismounted and shooting their Spencer's carbines, supported by their own artillery fire. The Confederates replied with heavy small arms and artillery fire. The Southern artillery had only solid shot on hand, while a short distance away was an arsenal which produced tons of canister, a highly effective anti-personnel ammunition.

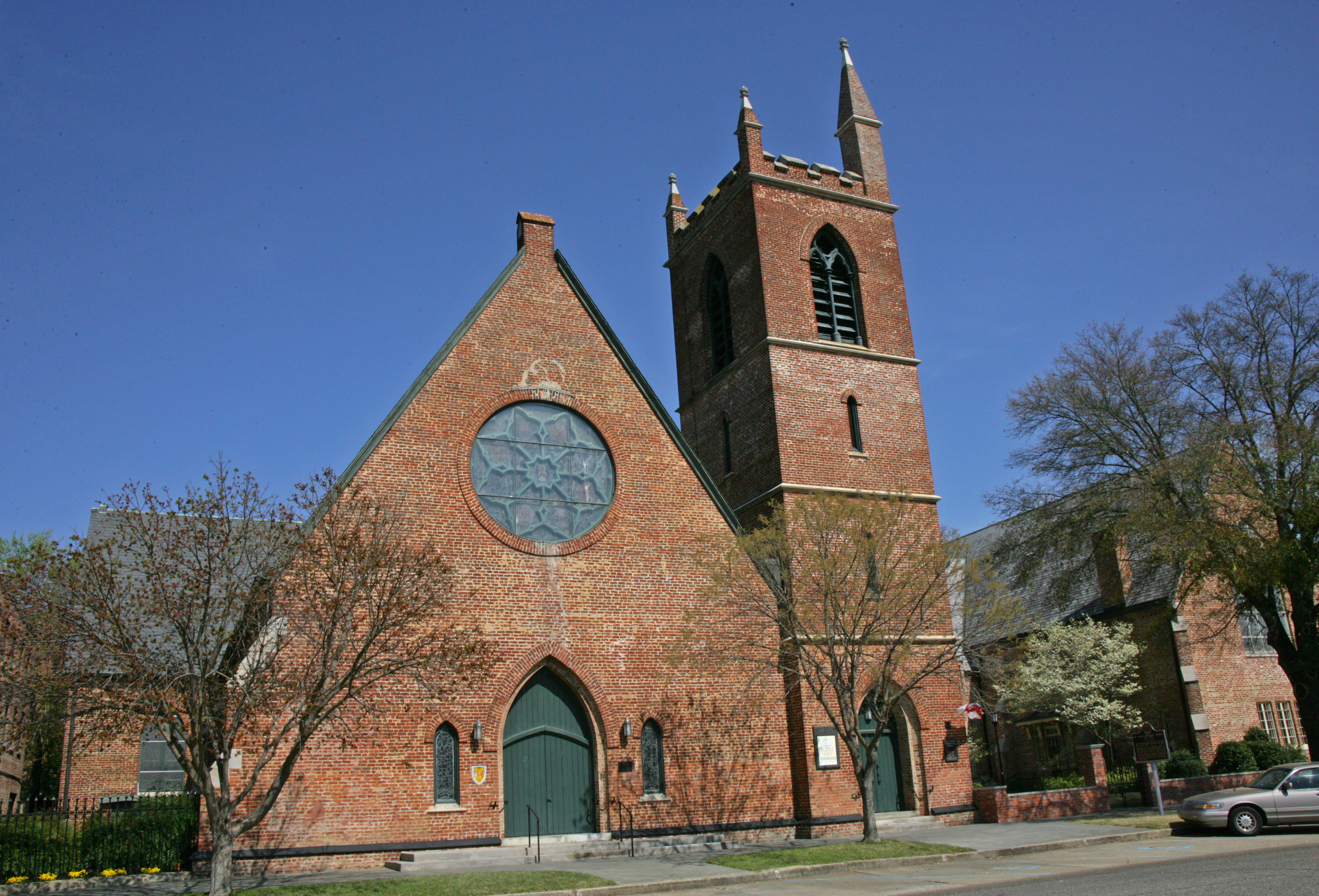
St. Paul's Episcopal Church burned following the Battle of Selma and was rebuilt in 1871.

The Federals suffered many casualties (including General Long) but continued their attack. Once the Union Army reached the works, there was vicious hand-to-hand fighting. Many soldiers were struck down with clubbed muskets, but they kept pouring into the works with their greater numbers. In less than 30 minutes, Long's men had captured the works protecting the Summerfield Road.

Meanwhile, General Upton, observing Long's success, ordered his division forward. They succeeded in overmounting the defenses and soon U.S. flags could be seen waving over the works from Range Line Road to Summerfield Road.

After the outer works fell, General Wilson led the 4th U.S. Cavalry Regiment in a mounted charge down the Range Line Road toward the unfinished inner line of works. The retreating Confederate forces, upon reaching the inner works, united and fired repeatedly together into the charging column. This broke up the charge and sent General Wilson sprawling to the ground when his favorite horse was wounded. He quickly remounted his stricken horse and ordered a dismounted assault by several regiments.

Mixed units of Confederate troops had also occupied the Selma railroad depot and the adjoining banks of the railroad bed to make a stand next to the Plantersville Road (present day Broad Street). The fighting there was heavy, but by 7 p.m. the superior numbers of Union troops had managed to flank the Southern positions. The Confederates abandoned the depot as well as the inner line of works.

In the darkness, the Federals rounded up hundreds of prisoners, but hundreds more escaped down the Burnsville Road, including generals Forrest, Armstrong, and Roddey. To the west, many Confederate soldiers fought the pursuing Union Army all the way down to the eastern side of Valley Creek. They escaped in the darkness by swimming across the Alabama River near the mouth of Valley Creek (where the present day Battle of Selma Reenactment is held.)

The Union troops looted the city that night and burned many businesses and private residences. They spent the next week destroying the arsenal and naval foundry. They left Selma heading to Montgomery. When the war ended three weeks later, they were en route to Columbus and Macon, Georgia.

=== Post-war period ===
Selma became the seat of Dallas County in 1866 and the county courthouse was built there. Planters and other slaveholders struggled with how to deal with freed slaves after the war. Insurgents tried to keep white supremacy over the freedmen, and most whites resented former slaves being granted the right to vote. As in other southern states, white Democrats regained political power in the mid-1870s after suppressing black voting through violence and fraud; Reconstruction officially ended in 1877 when federal troops were withdrawn. The white Democratic state legislature imposed Jim Crow laws of racial segregation in public facilities and other means of white supremacy.

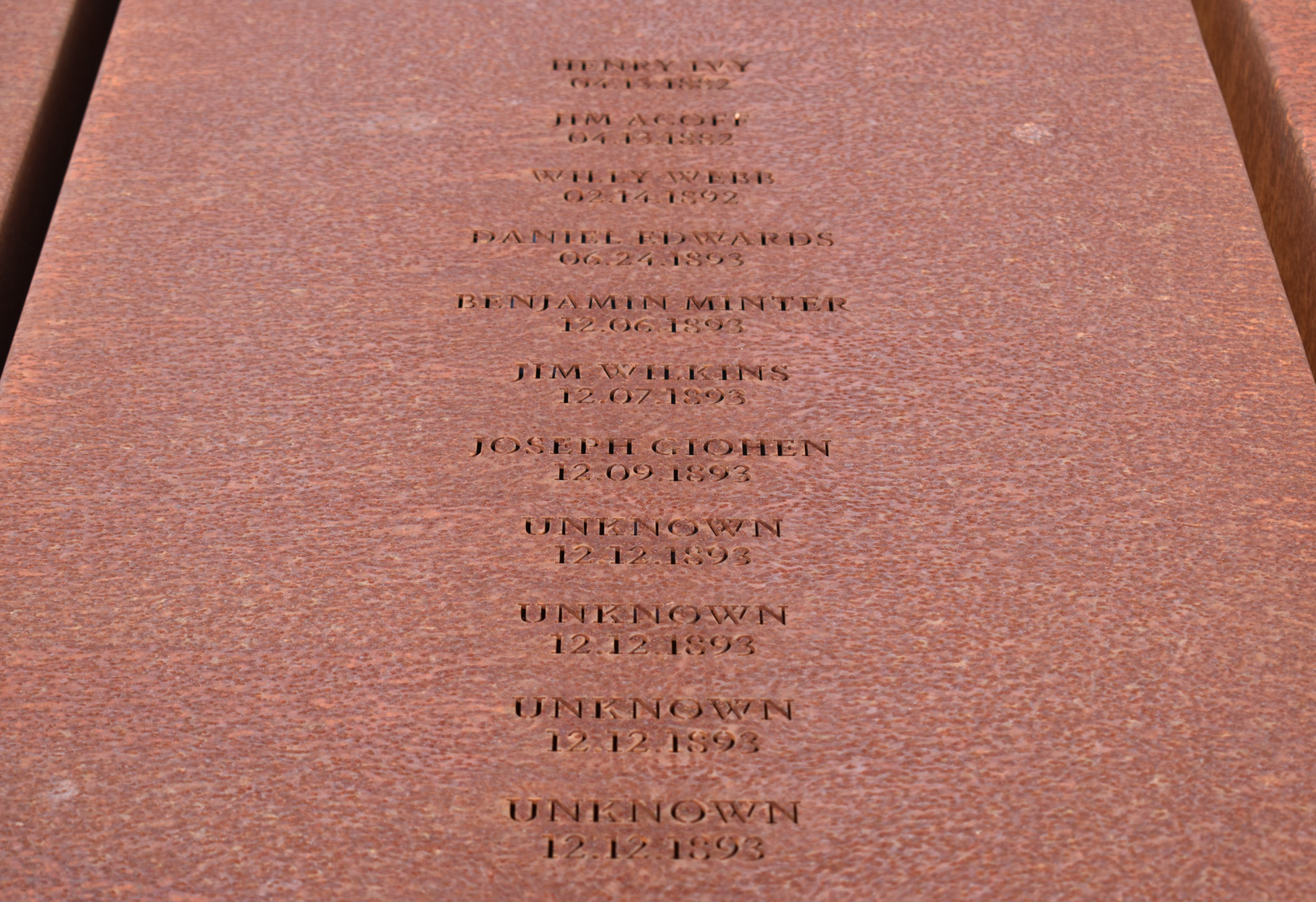
Portion of the corten steel monument at the EJI's National Memorial for Peace and Justice memorializing the Black individuals lynched in Dallas County, Alabama.

The city developed its own police force. County law enforcement was run by an elected county sheriff, whose jurisdiction included the grounds of the county courthouse. The county courthouse and jail were scenes of numerous lynchings of African-Americans, as sometimes mobs would take prisoners from the jail and hang them before trial. In February 1892, Willy Webb was put in the jail in Selma after police arrested him in Waynesville. The police intended to save Webb from a local lynch mob, but the mob abducted Webb from the jail and killed him. In June 1893, a lynch mob numbering 100 men seized "a black man named Daniel Edwards from the Selma jail, hanged him from a tree, and fired multiple rounds into his body" for allegedly becoming intimate with a white woman. In the 20th century, African-Americans were also lynched for labor-organizing activities. In 1935, Joe Spinner Johnson, a leader of the Alabama Sharecroppers Union, which worked from 1931 to 1936 to get better pay and treatment from white planters, was beaten by a mob near his field, taken to the jail in Selma and beaten more; his body was left in a field near Greensboro.

=== Twentieth century ===
In 1901, the state legislature passed a new constitution with electoral provisions, such as poll taxes and literacy tests, that effectively disenfranchised most blacks and tens of thousands of poor whites, leaving them without representation in government, and deprived them of participation in juries and other forms of citizenship. Selma, Dallas County and other jurisdictions carried out the segregation laws passed by the state.

Especially in the post-World War II period, legal challenges by the NAACP against Southern discriminatory laws enabled blacks to more freely exercise their constitutional rights as citizens.

==== Selma Voting Rights Movement ====
Selma maintained segregated schools and other facilities, enforcing the state law in new enterprises such as movie theaters. The Jim Crow laws and customs were enforced with violence.

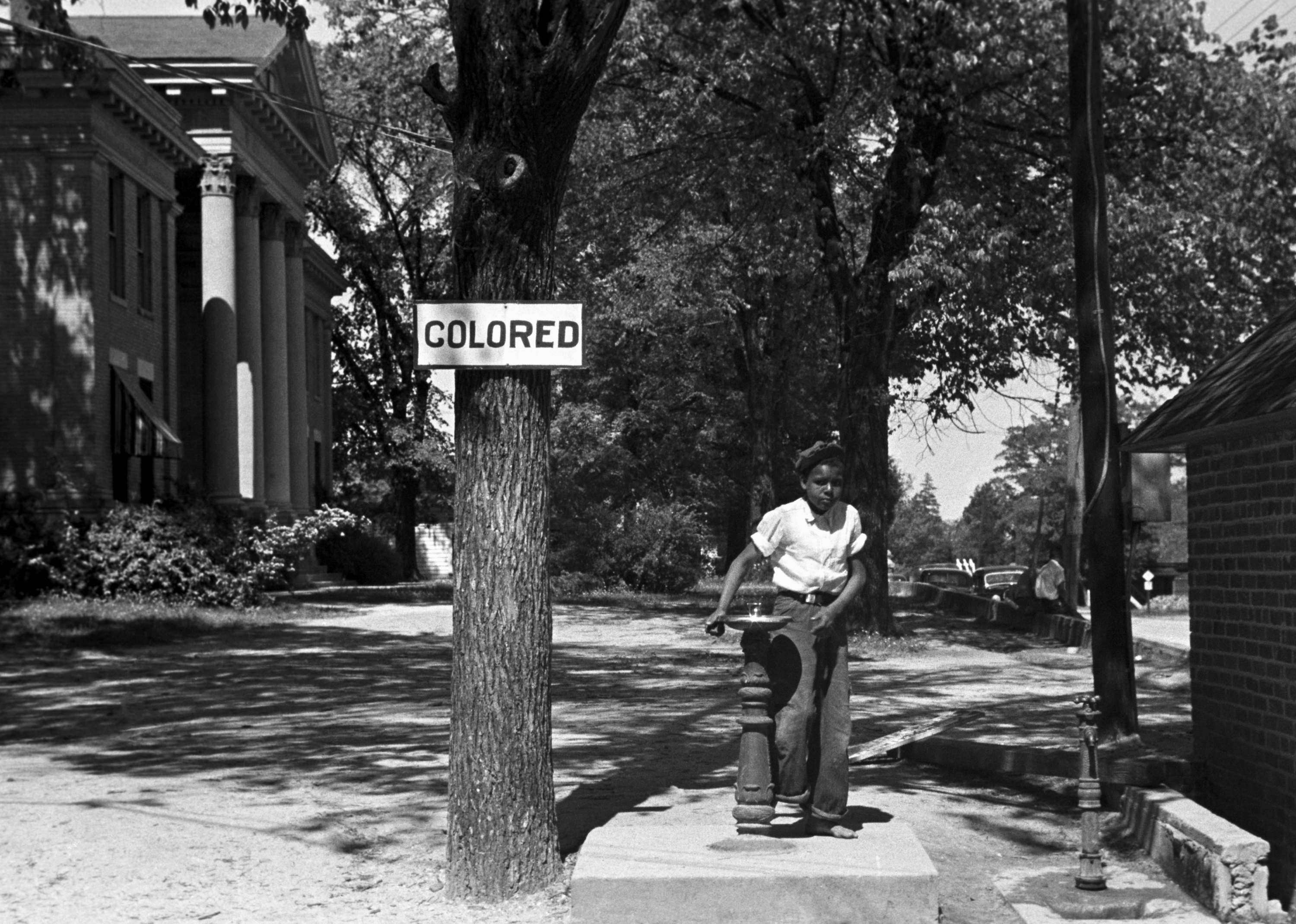
Segregated drinking fountain, 1938

In the 1960s, black people who pushed the boundaries, attempting to eat at "white-only" lunch counters or sit in the downstairs "white" section of movie theaters, were still beaten and arrested. Nearly half of Selma's residents were black, but because of the restrictive electoral laws and practices in place since the turn of the century, only one percent were registered to vote, preventing them from serving on juries or serving in local office. All the members of the city council were elected by at-large voting. Black people were prevented from registering to vote by means of a literacy test, administered in a subjective way, as well as through economic retaliation organized by the White Citizens' Council in response to civil rights activism, Ku Klux Klan violence and police repression. After the Supreme Court case Smith v. Allwright (1944) ended the use of white primaries by the Democratic Party, the Alabama state legislature passed a law giving voting registrars more authority to challenge prospective voters under the literacy test. In Selma, the county registration board opened doors for registration only two days a month, arrived late and took long lunches.

In early 1963, Bernard Lafayette and Colia Lafayette of the Student Nonviolent Coordinating Committee (SNCC) began organizing in Selma alongside local civil rights leaders Sam, Amelia and Bruce Boynton, Rev. L.L. Anderson of Tabernacle Baptist Church, J.L. Chestnut (Selma's first black attorney), SCLC Citizenship School teacher Marie Foster, public school teacher Marie Moore, Frederick D. Reese and others active with the Dallas County Voters League (DCVL).

In 1963, under the leadership of Patricia Swift Blalock, the public library of Selma-Dallas County was integrated.

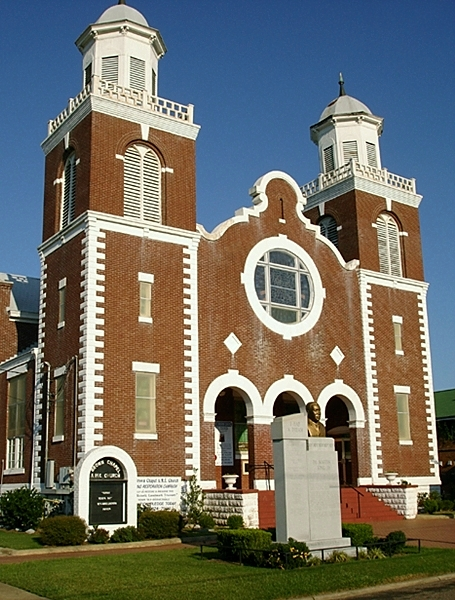
Brown Chapel A.M.E. Church in Selma. A gathering place for meetings and a starting point for the Selma to Montgomery civil rights marches of 1965, it has been designated as a National Historic Landmark.

Against fierce opposition from Dallas County Sheriff Jim Clark and his volunteer posse, black people continued their voter registration and desegregation efforts, which expanded during 1963 and the first part of 1964. Defying intimidation, economic retaliation, arrests, firings and beatings, an ever-increasing number of Dallas County blacks tried to register to vote, but few were able to do so under the subjective system administered by whites.

In the summer of 1964, a sweeping injunction issued by local judge James Hare barred any gathering of three or more people under sponsorship of SNCC, SCLC or DCVL, or with the involvement of 41 named civil rights leaders. This injunction temporarily halted civil-rights activity until Dr. Martin Luther King Jr. defied it by speaking to a crowd about the struggle at Brown Chapel AME Church on January 2, 1965. He had been invited by local leaders to help their movement.

Beginning in January 1965, SCLC and SNCC initiated a revived voting-rights campaign designed to focus national attention on the systematic denial of black voting rights in Alabama, and particularly in Selma. Over the next weeks, more than 3,000 African-Americans were arrested, and they suffered police violence and economic retaliation. Jimmie Lee Jackson, who was unarmed, was killed in a café in nearby Marion after state police broke up a peaceful protest in the town.

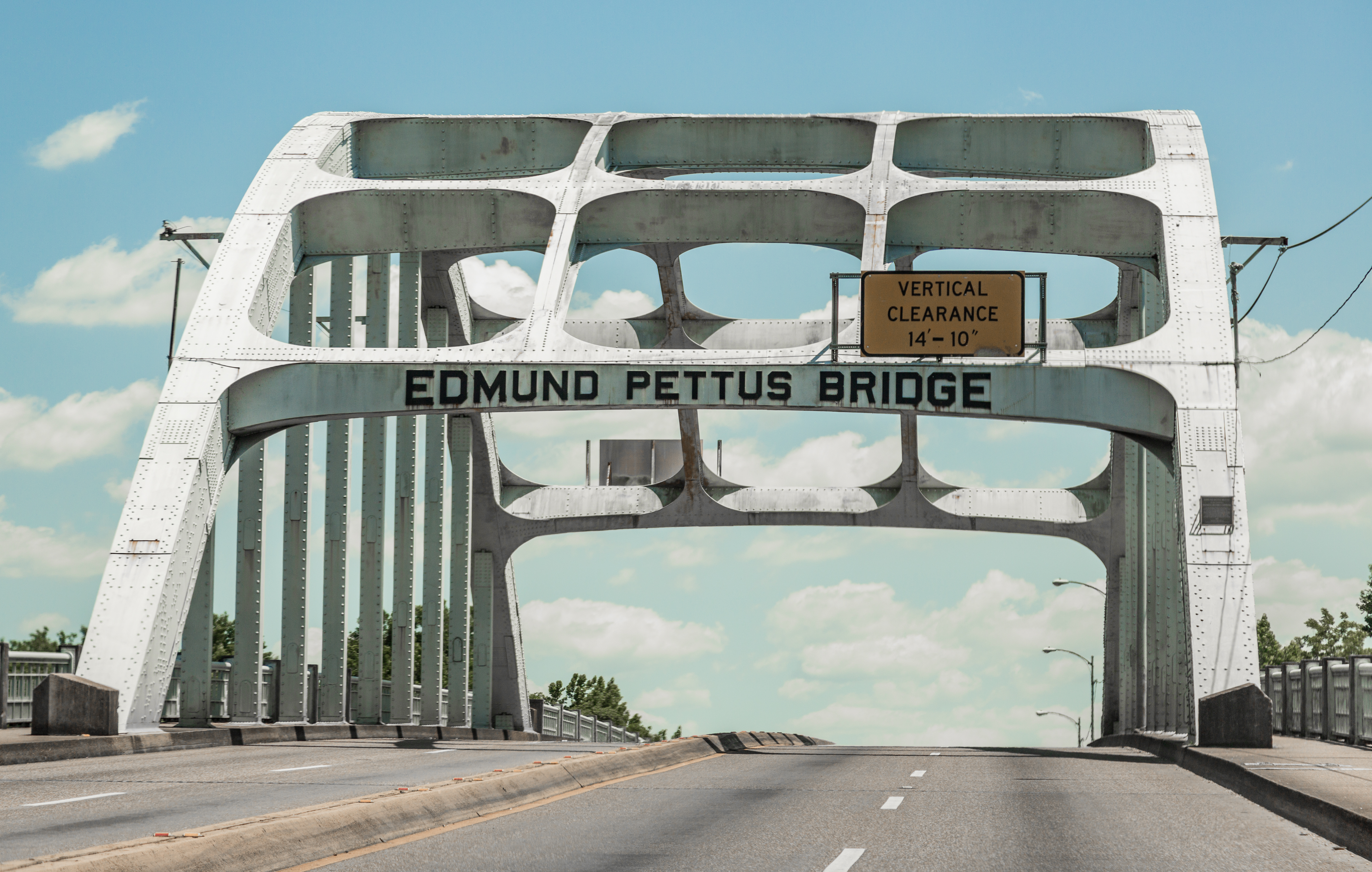
Edmund Pettus Bridge, heading out of downtown Selma, across the Alabama River, towards Montgomery. Pettus was a Confederate brigadier general, and later Grand Dragon of the Alabama Ku Klux Klan.

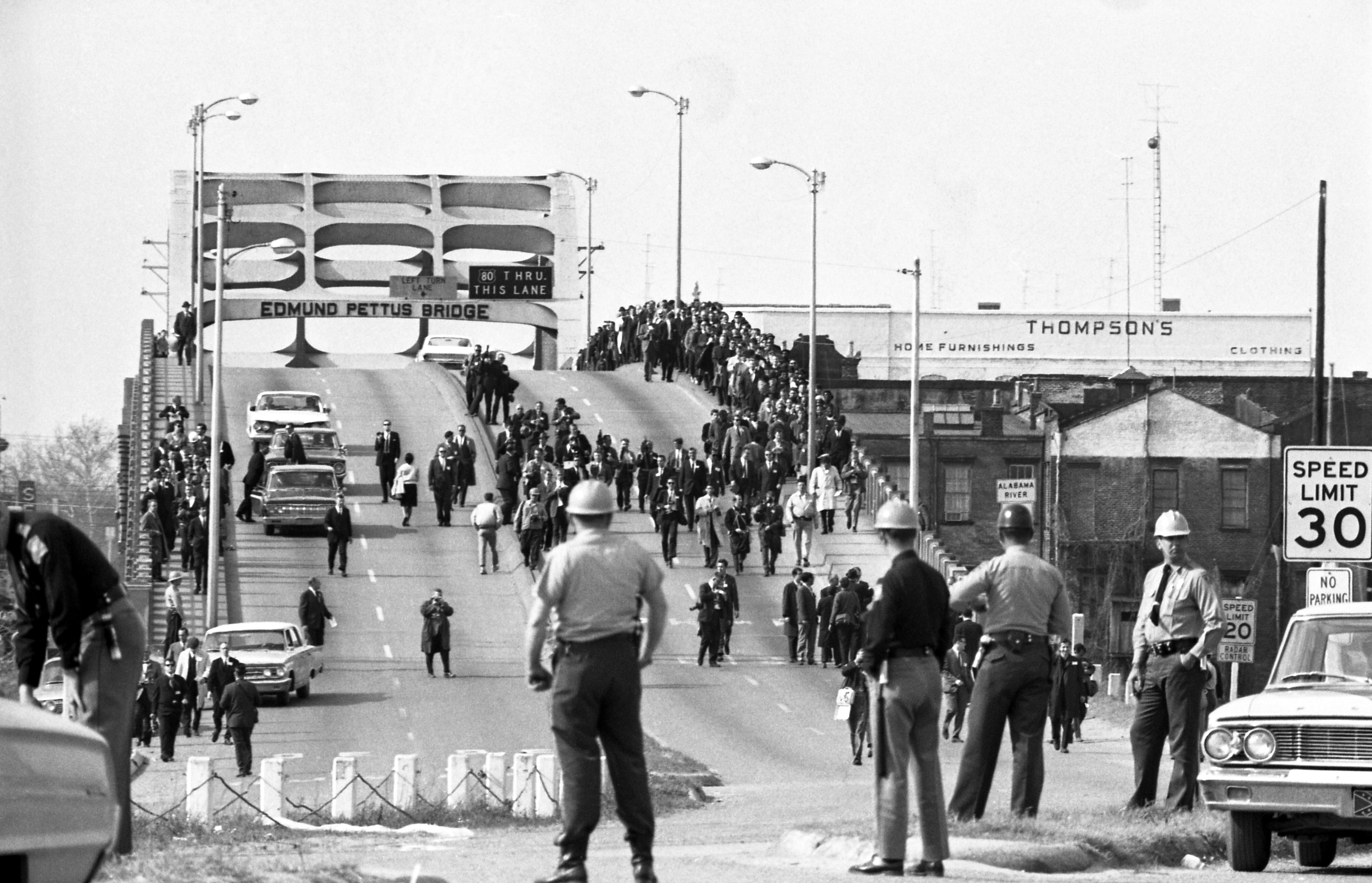
The Edmund Pettus Bridge, looking back towards Selma. Sheriff's deputies await the marchers on "Bloody Sunday".

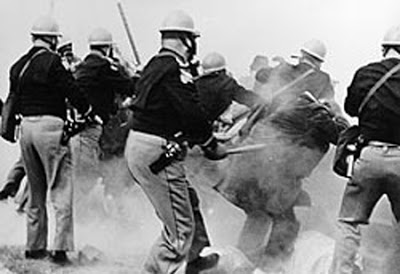
"Bloody Sunday", March 7, 1965. State troopers attack marchers crossing the Edmund Pettus Bridge.

Activists planned a larger, more public march from Selma to the state capital of Montgomery to publicize their cause. It was initiated and organized by James Bevel, SCLC's Director of Direct Action, who was directing SCLC's Selma Movement. This march represented one of the political and emotional peaks of the modern civil-rights movement. On March 7, 1965, approximately 600 civil rights marchers departed Selma on U.S. Highway 80, heading east to the capital. After they passed over the crest of the Edmund Pettus Bridge and left the boundaries of the city, they were confronted by county sheriff's deputies and state troopers, who attacked them using tear gas, horses and billy clubs, and drove them back across the bridge. Governor George Wallace had vowed that the march would not be permitted. Seventeen marchers were hospitalized and 50 more were treated for lesser injuries. Because of the brutal attacks, this became known as "Bloody Sunday". It was covered by national press and television news, reaching many American and international homes.

Two days after the first march, on March 9, 1965, Martin Luther King Jr. led a symbolic march over the bridge. By then local activists and residents had been joined by hundreds of protesters from across the country, including numerous clergy and nuns. White people made up one-third of the marchers. King pulled the marchers back from entering the county and having another confrontation with county and state forces. But that night, white minister James Reeb, who had traveled to the city from Boston, was attacked and killed in Selma by members of the KKK.

King and other civil-rights leaders filed for court protection for a third, larger-scale march from Selma to Montgomery, the state capital. King was also in touch with the administration of President Lyndon B. Johnson, who arranged for protection for another march. Frank Minis Johnson Jr., the federal district court judge for the area who reviewed the injunction, decided in favor of the demonstrators, saying:

The law is clear that the right to petition one's government for the redress of grievances may be exercised in large groups ... and these rights may be exercised by marching, even along public highways.

— Frank Johnson

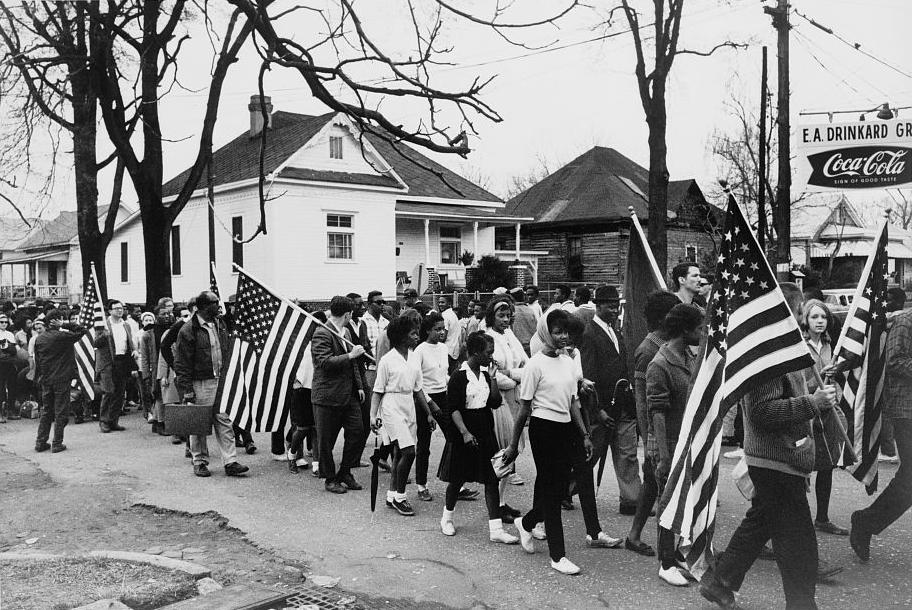
Selma to Montgomery marches, March 1965.

On Sunday, March 21, 1965, approximately 3,200 marchers departed for Montgomery. Marching in the front row with King were Rev. Ralph Abernathy, Rabbi Abraham Joshua Heschel, Greek Orthodox Father Iakovos (later Archbishop Iakovos of America) and Roman Catholic nuns. They walked approximately 12 miles a day and slept in nearby fields. The federal government provided protection in the form of National Guard and military troops. Thousands joined the march along the way. By the time the marchers reached the capital four days later, on March 25, their strength had swelled to around 25,000 people. Their moral campaign had attracted thousands from across the country.

The events at Selma helped increase public support for the cause; later that year the U.S. Congress passed the Voting Rights Act of 1965, a bill introduced, supported and signed by President Lyndon B. Johnson. It provided for federal oversight and enforcement of voting rights for all citizens in state or jurisdictions where patterns of underrepresentation showed discrimination against certain populations such as ethnic minorities.

By March 1966, a year after the Selma-to-Montgomery marches, nearly 11,000 black people had registered to vote in Selma, where 12,000 white people were registered. Registration increased by November, when Wilson Baker was elected as Dallas County Sheriff to replace the notorious Jim Clark.

However, seven years later, black people had not been able to elect a candidate of their choice to the city council. The council's members were elected at-large by the entire city, and the white majority had managed to control the elections. Threatened with a lawsuit under the Voting Rights Act, the council voted to adopt a system of electing its ten members from single-member districts. After the change, five African-American Democrats were elected to the city council, including activist Frederick Douglas Reese, who became a major power in the city; five white people were also elected to the council.

=== Twenty-first century ===
On January 12, 2023, Selma was hit by a large and destructive EF2 tornado. Many buildings were heavily damaged throughout the city and two people were injured.

== Geography ==
According to the United States Census Bureau, the city has an area of 14.403 square miles (37.30 km^{2}), of which 13.809 square miles (35.77 km^{2}) is land and 0.594 square miles (1.54 km^{2}), is water.

=== Climate ===
Climate data for Selma, Alabama (1991–2020, extremes 1896–present)
Month	Jan	Feb	Mar	Apr	May	Jun	Jul	Aug	Sep	Oct	Nov	Dec	Year
Record high °F (°C)	85 (29)	85 (29)	92 (33)	95 (35)	100 (38)	108 (42)	107 (42)	105 (41)	105 (41)	103 (39)	92 (33)	85 (29)	108 (42)
Mean maximum °F (°C)	74.3 (23.5)	77.6 (25.3)	83.2 (28.4)	86.4 (30.2)	92.3 (33.5)	96.0 (35.6)	97.8 (36.6)	97.6 (36.4)	94.6 (34.8)	88.7 (31.5)	81.2 (27.3)	75.7 (24.3)	98.8 (37.1)
Mean daily maximum °F (°C)	59.2 (15.1)	63.3 (17.4)	71.1 (21.7)	78.0 (25.6)	85.3 (29.6)	91.1 (32.8)	93.2 (34.0)	93.1 (33.9)	88.7 (31.5)	79.7 (26.5)	69.2 (20.7)	61.0 (16.1)	77.7 (25.4)
Daily mean °F (°C)	47.5 (8.6)	51.3 (10.7)	58.4 (14.7)	65.0 (18.3)	73.1 (22.8)	80.0 (26.7)	82.5 (28.1)	82.2 (27.9)	77.6 (25.3)	67.3 (19.6)	56.1 (13.4)	49.5 (9.7)	65.9 (18.8)
Mean daily minimum °F (°C)	35.9 (2.2)	39.4 (4.1)	45.6 (7.6)	52.1 (11.2)	60.9 (16.1)	68.9 (20.5)	71.8 (22.1)	71.4 (21.9)	66.6 (19.2)	55.0 (12.8)	43.0 (6.1)	38.0 (3.3)	54.1 (12.3)
Mean minimum °F (°C)	20.5 (−6.4)	25.1 (−3.8)	30.2 (−1.0)	38.7 (3.7)	47.9 (8.8)	61.9 (16.6)	66.8 (19.3)	65.1 (18.4)	54.4 (12.4)	39.0 (3.9)	28.9 (−1.7)	25.5 (−3.6)	18.3 (−7.6)
Record low °F (°C)	0 (−18)	−5 (−21)	18 (−8)	26 (−3)	38 (3)	42 (6)	57 (14)	56 (13)	40 (4)	27 (−3)	13 (−11)	5 (−15)	−5 (−21)
Average precipitation inches (mm)	5.08 (129)	5.35 (136)	5.35 (136)	4.56 (116)	4.10 (104)	4.32 (110)	5.11 (130)	4.92 (125)	3.80 (97)	2.66 (68)	4.07 (103)	5.21 (132)	54.53 (1,385)
Average snowfall inches (cm)	0.2 (0.51)	0.0 (0.0)	0.2 (0.51)	0.0 (0.0)	0.0 (0.0)	0.0 (0.0)	0.0 (0.0)	0.0 (0.0)	0.0 (0.0)	0.0 (0.0)	0.0 (0.0)	0.0 (0.0)	0.4 (1.0)
Average precipitation days (≥ 0.01 in)	8.9	8.7	8.3	6.8	6.9	9.1	9.8	8.6	5.7	4.8	6.4	8.6	92.6
Average snowy days (≥ 0.1 in)	0.1	0.0	0.0	0.0	0.0	0.0	0.0	0.0	0.0	0.0	0.0	0.0	0.1
Source: NOAA

== Demographics ==
Historical population
Census	Pop.	Note	%±
1830	401		—
1840	1,199		199.0%
1850	3,073		156.3%
1860	3,177		3.4%
1870	6,484		104.1%
1880	7,529		16.1%
1890	7,622		1.2%
1900	8,713		14.3%
1910	13,649		56.7%
1920	15,589		14.2%
1930	18,012		15.5%
1940	19,834		10.1%
1950	22,840		15.2%
1960	28,385		24.3%
1970	27,379		−3.5%
1980	26,684		−2.5%
1990	23,755		−11.0%
2000	20,512		−13.7%
2010	20,872		1.8%
2020	17,971		−13.9%
2025 (est.)	15,934	▼	−11.3%
U.S. Decennial Census; 2020 Census

=== Racial and ethnic composition ===
Selma, Alabama – racial and ethnic composition Note: the US Census treats Hispanic/Latino as an ethnic category. This table excludes Latinos from the racial categories and assigns them to a separate category. Hispanics/Latinos may be of any race.
Race / ethnicity (NH = non-Hispanic)	Pop. 2000	Pop. 2010	Pop. 2020	% 2000	% 2010	% 2020
White alone (NH)	5,875	3,716	2,573	28.64%	17.80%	14.32%
Black or African American alone (NH)	14,242	16,599	14,757	69.43%	79.53%	82.12%
Native American or Alaska Native alone (NH)	19	33	26	0.09%	0.16%	0.14%
Asian alone (NH)	113	121	107	0.55%	0.58%	0.60%
Native Hawaiian or Pacific Islander alone (NH)	2	5	6	0.01%	0.02%	0.03%
Other race alone (NH)	11	11	14	0.05%	0.05%	0.08%
Mixed race or multiracial (NH)	112	146	354	0.55%	0.70%	1.97%
Hispanic or Latino (any race)	138	125	134	0.67%	0.60%	0.75%
Total	20,512	20,872	17,971	100.00%	100.00%	100.00%

=== 2023 American Community Survey ===
As of the 2023 American Community Survey, there are 7,796 estimated households in Selma with an average of 2.19 persons per household. The city has a median household income of $32,184. Approximately 28.3% of the city's population lives at or below the poverty line. Selma has an estimated 52.0% employment rate, with 19.0% of the population holding a bachelor's degree or higher and 88.3% holding a high school diploma.

The top five reported ancestries (people were allowed to report up to two ancestries, thus the figures will generally add to more than 100%) were English (97.2%), Spanish (0.4%), Indo-European (0.7%), Asian and Pacific Islander (0.3%), and Other (1.5%).

The median age in the city was 39.4 years.

=== 2020 census ===
As of the 2020 census, there were 17,971 people, 7,568 households, and 4,574 families residing in the city. The median age was 39.6 years. 25.0% of residents were under the age of 18 and 18.2% were 65 years of age or older. For every 100 females, there were 80.9 males, and for every 100 females age 18 and over, there were 75.2 males.

99.1% of residents lived in urban areas, while 0.9% lived in rural areas.

Of all households, 31.2% had children under the age of 18 living in them. 22.4% were married-couple households, 20.5% were households with a male householder and no spouse or partner present, and 51.5% were households with a female householder and no spouse or partner present. About 35.9% of all households were made up of individuals, and 15.5% had someone living alone who was 65 years of age or older.

The population density was 1,301.4 inhabitants per square mile (502.5/km^{2}). There were 8,946 housing units at an average density of 647.8 per square mile (250.1/km^{2}), with 15.4% vacant. The homeowner vacancy rate was 4.2%, and the rental vacancy rate was 8.8%.

=== 2010 census ===
As of the 2010 census, there were 20,872 people, 8,086 households, and _ families residing in the city. The population density was 1,503.1 inhabitants per square mile (580.4/km^{2}). There were 9,429 housing units at an average density of 682.8 per square mile (263.6/km^{2}). The racial makeup of the city was 17.92% White, 79.87% African American, 0.16% Native American, 0.58% Asian, 0.02% Pacific Islander, 0.12% from some other races and 0.75% from two or more races. Hispanic or Latino people of any race were 0.60% of the population.

=== 2000 census ===
As of the 2000 census, there were 20,512 people, 8,196 households, and 5,343 families besiding in the city. The population density was 1,479.6 inhabitants per square mile (571.3/km^{2}). There were 9,264 housing units at an average density of 668.3 per square mile (258.0/km^{2}). The racial makeup of the city was 28.77% White, 70.68% African American, 0.10% Native American, 0.56% Asian, 0.01% Pacific Islander, 0.22% from some other races and 0.66% from two or more races. Hispanic or Latino people of any race were 0.67% of the population.

There were 8,196 households, out of which 30.3% had children under the age of 18 living with them; 34.2% were married couples living together, 27.2% had a female householder with no husband present, and 34.8% were non-families. 32.6% of all households were made up of individuals, and 14.6% had someone living alone who was 65 years of age or older. The average household size was 2.44 and the average family size was 3.10.

In the city, the population was spread out, with 27.3% under the age of 18, 9.7% from 18 to 24, 24.9% from 25 to 44, 21.8% from 45 to 64, and 16.3% who were 65 years of age or older. The median age was 36 years. For every 100 females, there were 78.2 males. For every 100 females age 18 and over, there were 72.0 males.

The median income for a household in the city was $21,261, and the median income for a family was $28,345. Males had a median income of $29,769 versus $18,129 for females. The per capita income for the city was $13,369. About 26.9% of families and 31.7% of the population were below the poverty line, including 41.8% of those under age 18 and 28.0% of those age 65 or over.==Economy== Industries in Selma include International Paper, Bush Hog UPF industries Lear (agricultural equipment), Plantation Patterns, American Apparel, and Peerless Pump Company (LaBour), Renasol, and Hyundai.

The city and rural region have struggled economically, as agriculture does not provide enough jobs. There was a downturn after restructuring in industry that had done well into the 1960s.

Civil rights tourism has become a new source of business.

== Arts and culture ==
=== Arts ===
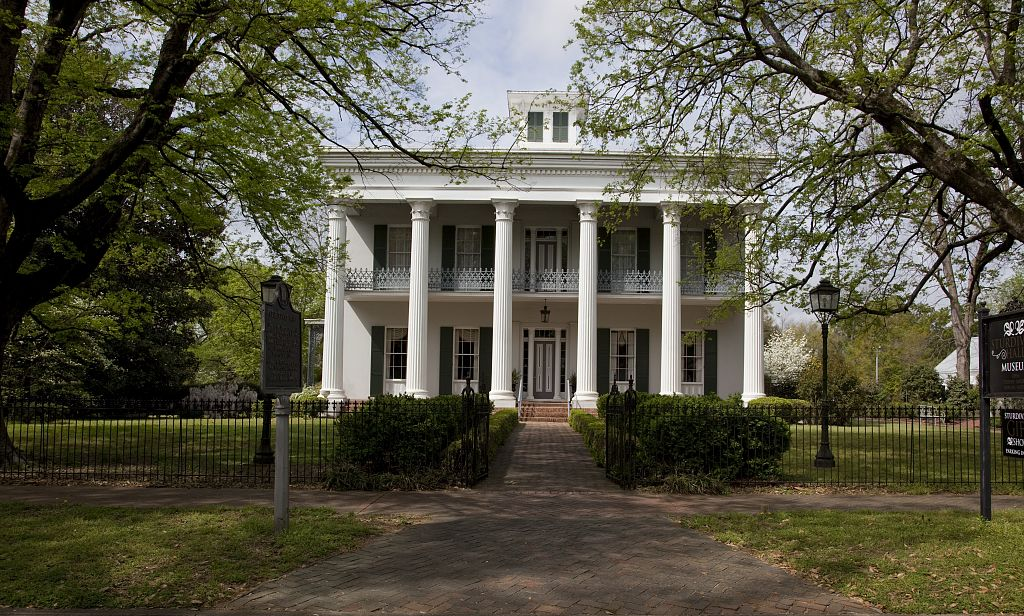
Sturdivant Hall, completed in 1856 and now a historic house museum.

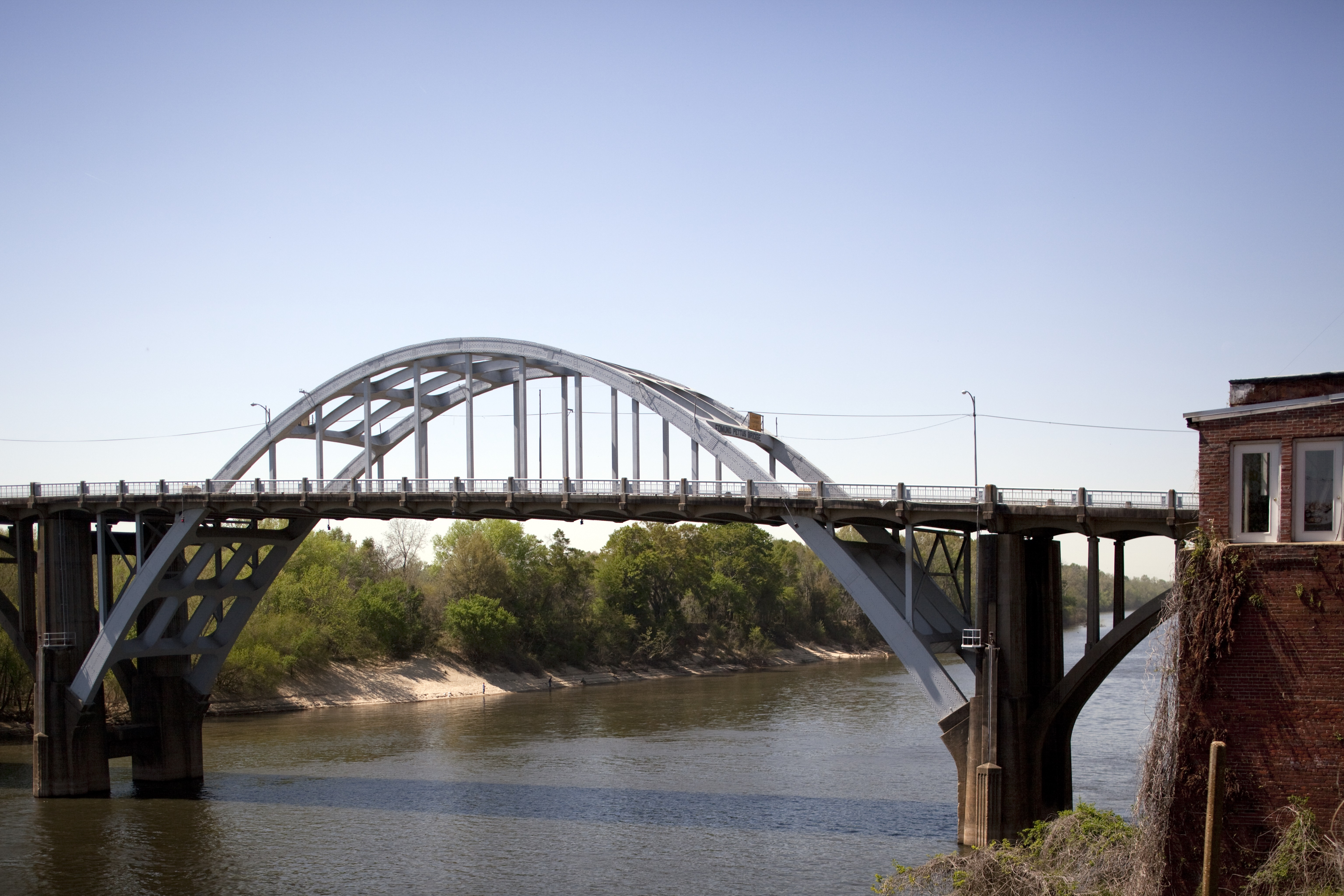
The Edmund Pettus Bridge over the Alabama River in Selma, site of some of the events of "Bloody Sunday" during the Civil Rights Movement.

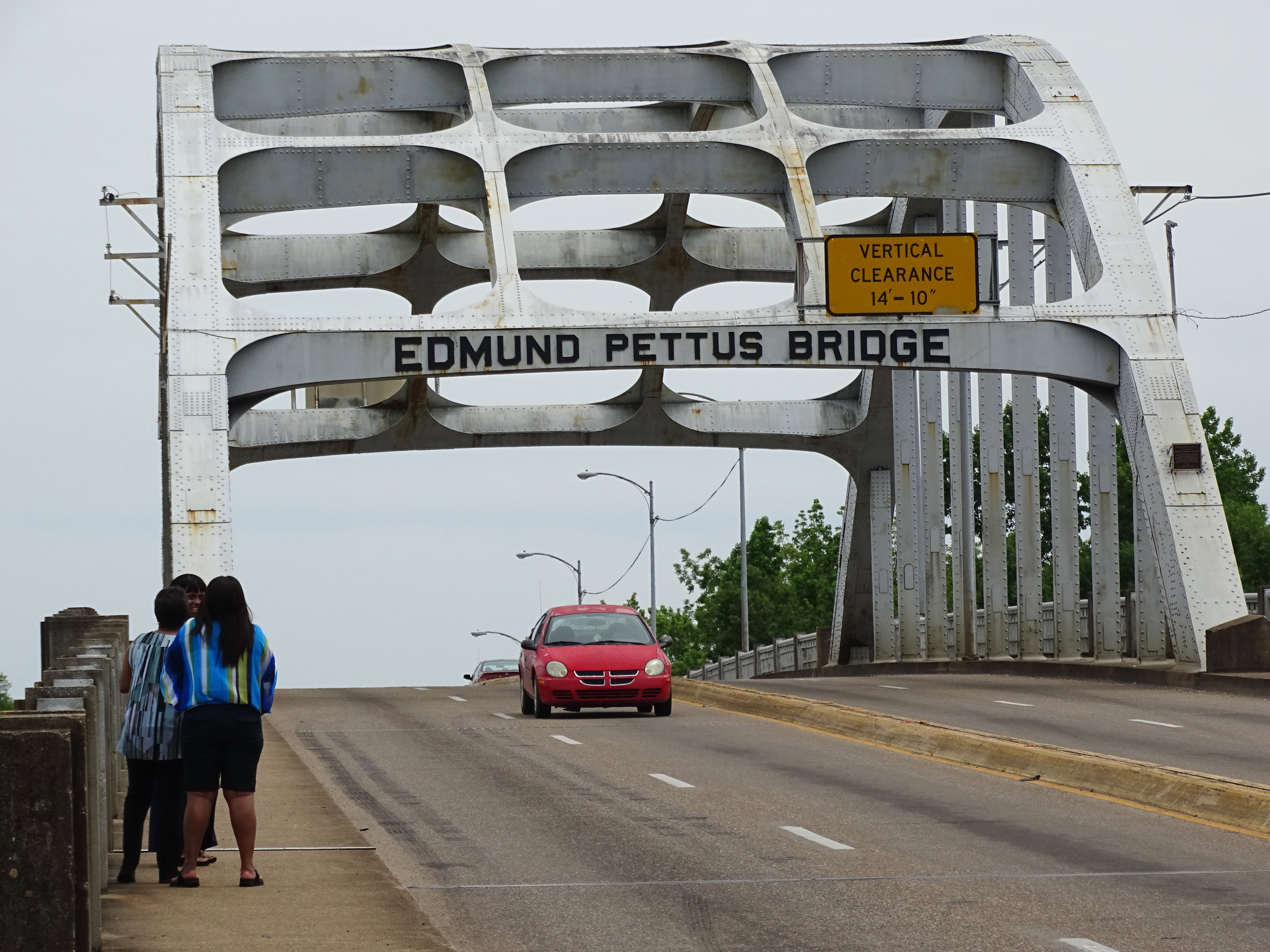
Another view of the Edmund Pettus Bridge.

Cultural events are held at the Performing Arts Center, and the Selma Art Guild Gallery.

=== Museums and points of interest ===
Museums in the city include Sturdivant Hall, the National Voting Rights Museum, Historic Water Avenue, Martin Luther King Jr. Street Historic Walking Tour, Old Depot Museum, Joe Calton Bates Children Education and History Museum, Vaughan-Smitherman Museum and Heritage Village.

Selma boasts the state's largest contiguous historic district, with more than 1,250 structures identified as contributing. Area attractions include the Old Town Historic District, Old Live Oak Cemetery, Paul M. Grist State Park, and Old Cahawba Archaeological Park.

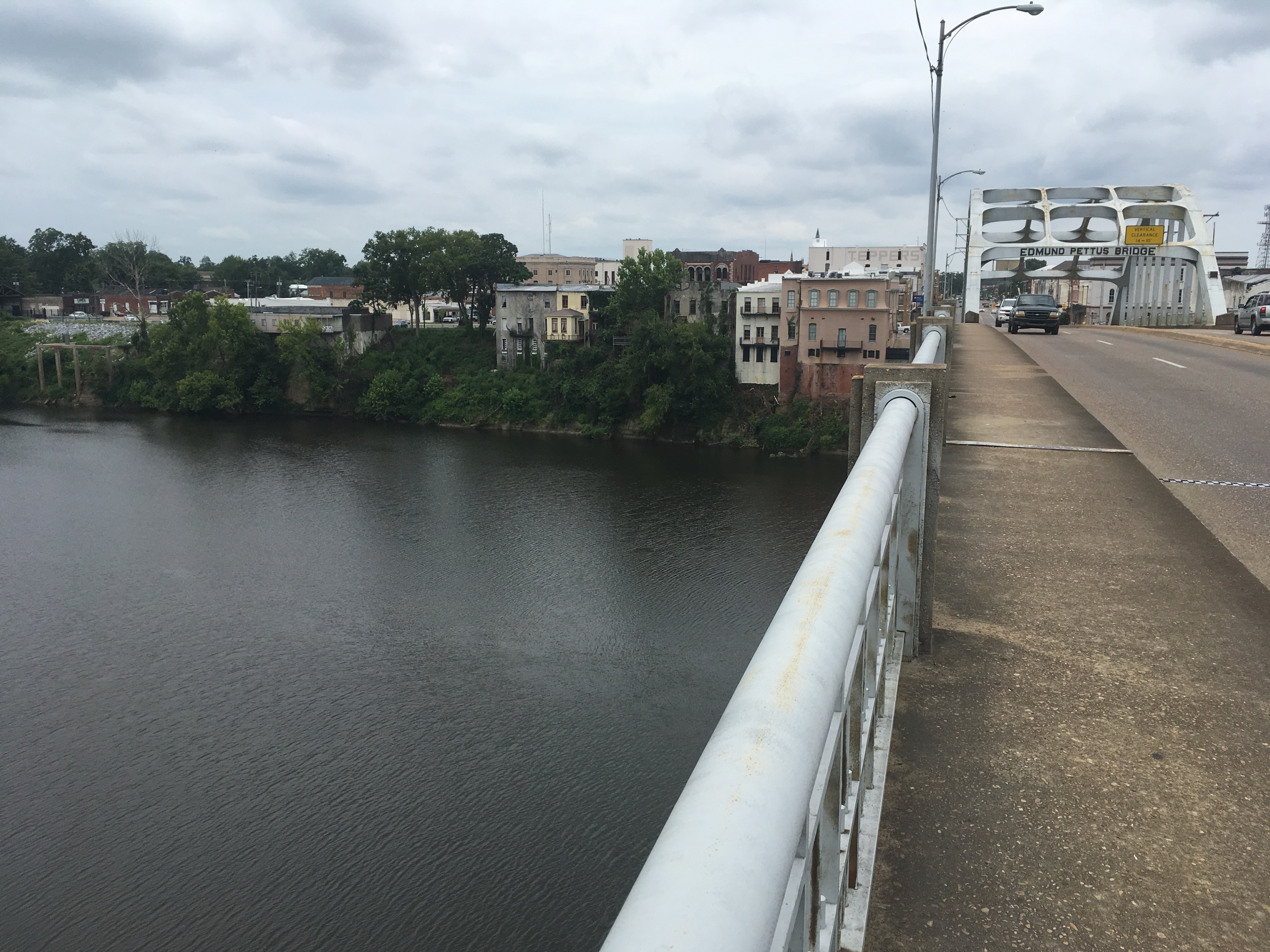
Edmund Pettus Bridge over the Alabama River

The complex history is reflected in naming and monuments as well. Highway 80, which runs east and west through Selma and the state has reflected this in naming patterns. In 1920 the east-west Highway 80 was designated as part of the Jefferson Davis Memorial Highway. In 1977 US 80 was named Givhan Parkway in honor of the long-serving state senator Walter C. Givhan, a segregationist to the end. In 1996 it was designated as part of the 'National Civil Rights Trail' by President Bill Clinton and is administered by the National Park Service. In 2000 sections of Highway 80 leading into Selma were renamed in honor of leaders in the Selma Voting Rights Movement: F.D. Reese, Marie Foster, and Amelia Boynton.

As part of its Civil War history, a monument to native Nathan Bedford Forrest, a Confederate General, was installed in Old Live Oak Cemetery. It was torn down in 2012, reflecting the continuing controversy about him. In August 2012, plans were announced to build a larger monument, more resistant to vandalism, but many African Americans object to it because of his established history as a postwar leader with the KKK and his earlier involvement in the massacre of black Union troops at Fort Pillow.

=== Library ===
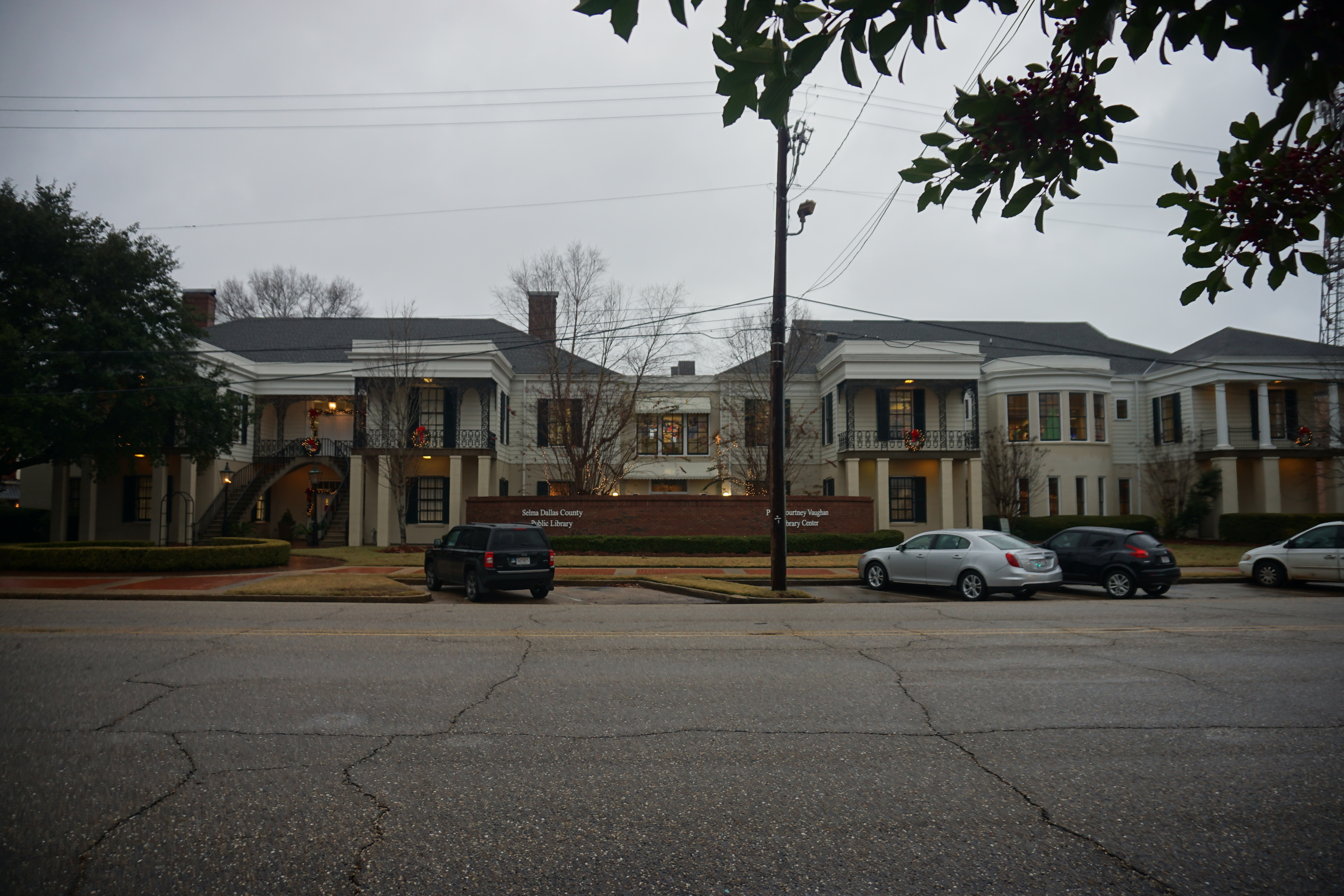
Selma-Dallas County Public Library

The Selma-Dallas County Public Library serves the city and the region with a collection of 76,751 volumes. It was established as a Carnegie library in 1904, receiving matching funds for construction. The 25,000 square feet (2,300 m^{2}) library is in downtown Selma.

== Sports ==
Selma's Bloch Park was home to Southeastern League of Professional Baseball club the Selma Cloverleafs.

== Government ==
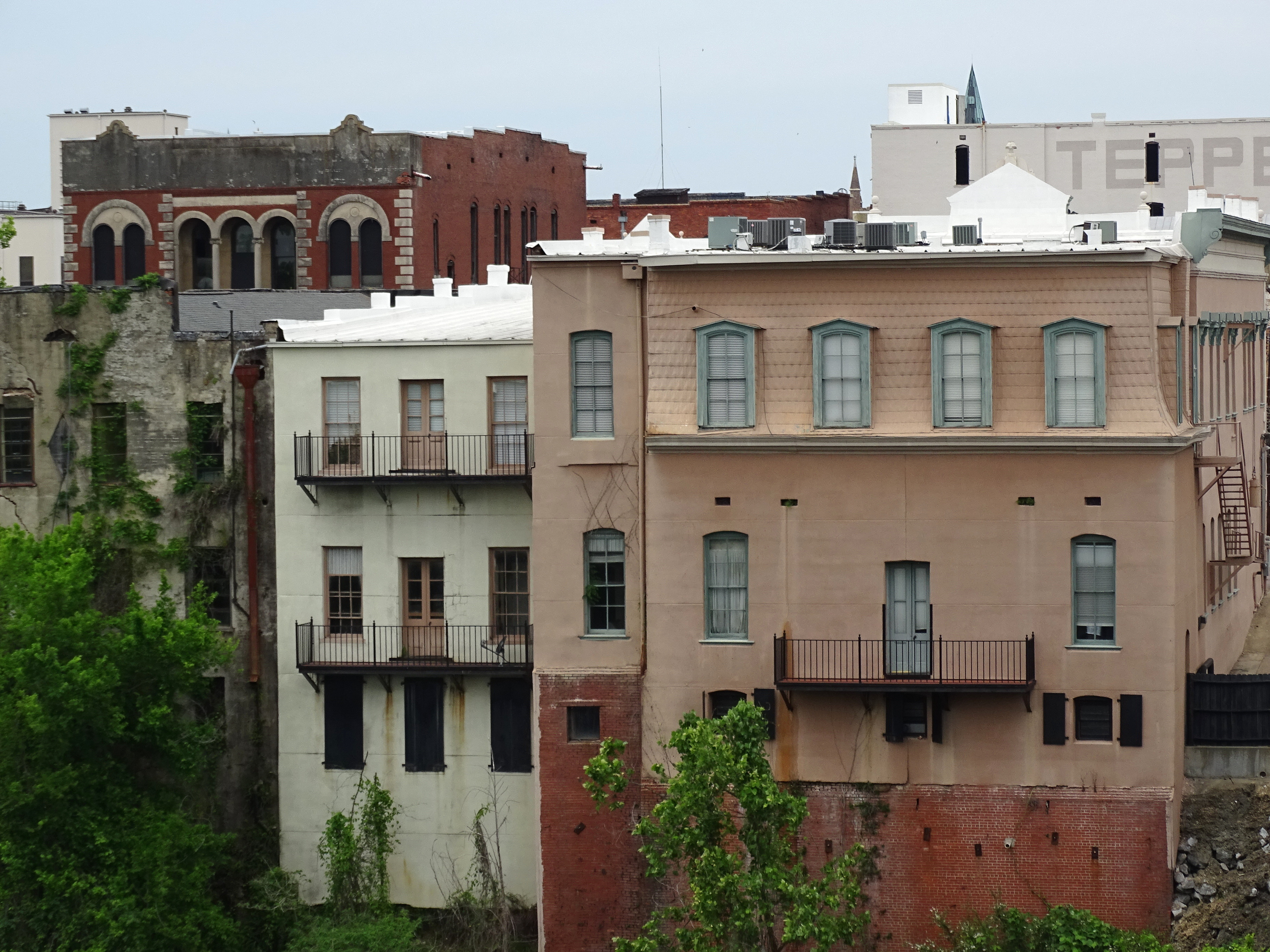
Downtown Selma facades.

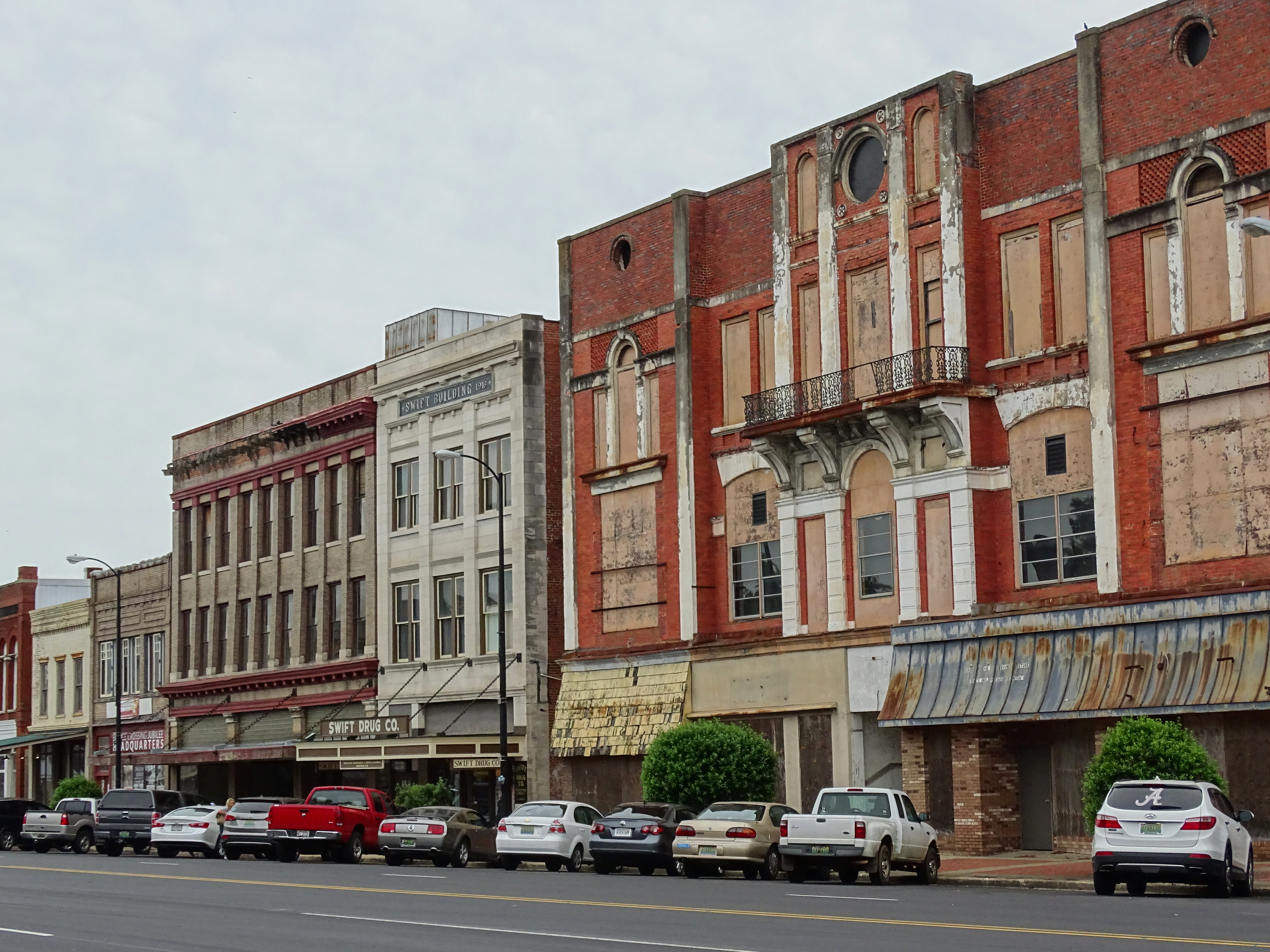
Facades along Main Street in Selma.

The city government of Selma consists of a mayor and a nine-member city council, elected from single-member districts. The Newly Elected mayor is Johnny E. Moss The city council members are: Kennard Randolph, City Council President; Troy Harvill, Ward 1; Christie Thomas, Ward 2; Clay Carmichael, Ward 3; Lesia James, Ward 4; Nadine Sturdivant, Ward 5; Ashley Ervin, Ward 6; Jannie Thomas, Ward 7; Michael Johnson, Ward 8.

== Transportation ==
- U.S. Highway 80
- State Route 14
- State Route 22
- State Route 41
- State Route 140
- State Route 219

=== Airports ===
- Craig Field (SEM), located four nautical miles (4.6 mi; 7.4 km) southeast of the central business district of Selma. It is a Class D airport, with a non-federal contract control tower staffed by students and staff of Advanced ATC.

== Education ==
=== Colleges and universities ===
Colleges in Selma include Selma University and Wallace Community College Selma, which is located at the edge of the city limits near Valley Grande, Alabama. Concordia College Alabama, a private Lutheran university, operated in Selma from 1922 to 2018. Daniel Payne College, an institution of the African Methodist Episcopal Church, operated in Selma from 1889 to 1922.

=== Public ===
Selma City Schools operates the city's public schools. The public high school is Selma High School. Middle schools include R.B. Hudson Middle School and the School of Discovery. The city has eight elementary schools.

=== Private ===
Selma has four private K–12 schools: John T. Morgan Academy, founded in 1965, Meadowview Christian School, Ellwood Christian Academy, and Cathedral Christian Academy.

== Media ==
Selma is served by the Montgomery-Selma television Designated Market Area (DMA). Charter Communications provides cable television service. DirecTV and Dish Network provide direct broadcast satellite television including both local and national channels to area residents.

=== Radio stations ===
- WALX 100.9 FM (Classic Hits)
- WAPR 88.3 FM (Educational)
- WAQU 91.1 FM (Christian)
- WDXX 100.1 FM (country)
- WHBB 1490 AM (news/Talk/Gospel)
- WJAM 1340 AM/96.3 FM (Urban adult contemporary)
- WRNF 89.5 FM (Religious)
- WBFZ 105.3 FM ([Gospel Blues R&B Talk])

=== Television stations ===
- WAKA (Channel 8) CBS
- WBIH (Channel 29) Independent

=== Newspaper ===
- Selma Times-Journal (daily)
- Selma Sun (weekly)

== In popular culture ==
- Selma, a 2014 award-winning film, features a filmed-on-location reenactment of the events surrounding the 1965 Selma to Montgomery marches on "Bloody Sunday".
- Selma was featured in the 1999 Disney television movie Selma, Lord, Selma for its historical significance in the Civil Rights Movement on "Bloody Sunday".
- 1968's The Heart Is a Lonely Hunter was filmed in Selma.
- Blue Sky was filmed at Craig Field, the former Air Force base located at the edge of the city. The 1994 film employed many of the people of Selma as extras, including local high school marching bands.
- Body Snatchers film was partially filmed at Craig Field.
- Selma is mentioned in the 1965 song "Eve of Destruction" by P. F. Sloan
- Referenced in Charles Mingus's 1965 composition "It Was a Lonely Day in Selma, Alabama".
