= James Orange =

American pastor and activist

- Born: James Edward Orange; October 29, 1942; Birmingham, Alabama, U.S.
- Died: February 16, 2008 (aged 65); Atlanta, Georgia, U.S.
- Education: Bishop College, Dallas, TX
- Occupations: Pastor, activist
- Organization: SCLC
- Movement: Civil Rights Movement, Peace movement
- Spouse: Cleophas Orange
- Children: Pamela Aquica Orange, Jamida Orange

James Edward Orange (October 29, 1942 – February 16, 2008), also known as "Shackdaddy", was a leading civil rights activist in the Civil Rights Movement in America. He was assistant to Martin Luther King Jr. in the civil rights movement. Orange joined the civil rights marches led by King and Ralph Abernathy in Atlanta in 1963. Later he became a project coordinator for Southern Christian Leadership Conference, drawing young people into the movement.

== Personal life ==
James Edward Orange was born in Birmingham, Alabama, but moved to Atlanta, Georgia in the early 1960s. Orange, at over 6 feet 3 inches (1.91 m) tall and over 300 pounds (140 kg), was physically impressive but deeply committed to non-violence. In his attempts to convert gang members in Chicago to adopt nonviolent principles, he endured nine beatings without resistance. He was also known for preaching and singing in a strong baritone voice.

Orange had a large family, several of whom were active in the civil rights movement. He was the third of his parents' seven children. His father worked in the large ACIPCO foundry in Birmingham, but was fired in 1957 for union activity. Orange's mother was very active in the Civil Rights Movement and also attended the Monday night mass meetings at the Sixteenth Street church. Still, he told an interviewer on January 15, 2000, "I was afraid to go home and tell my mamma that her daughters, one 17 and the other 14, were in jail. But that's the way it was in those days, as we waged — and won — a non-violent campaign against police clubs and police dogs."

== Civil rights era ==
Speaking 1993, Andrew Young called Orange one of the "real soldiers of the movement ... a gentle giant." Quoted by the Atlanta Journal-Constitution at Orange's death, Young said that when Orange was hired as a field organizer in the early 1960s, "He couldn't afford to go to college and was working as a chef. He quit his job and started going with us, although we were only paying $10 a week. And he never left."

In 1963, working as a chef in Birmingham, Orange wasn't involved heavily in Civil Rights. When he was invited to attend a Civil Rights speech with a friend, he accepted. At the weekly Monday night mass meetings at the 16th Street Baptist Church, he was transfixed by a speech on equality by Ralph Abernathy. Once Orange heard Abernathy speak, his passion was ignited. He said, "...The longer I listened, the more intently I listened, I became absorbed in his message..." In a meeting in the church basement later that night, he volunteered to risk arrest picketing a local store the next day. He remarked later that he was probably assigned the task because of his massive size. He was arrested, the first of at least 104 arrests for picketing or acts of civil disobedience.

Orange became involved with the Southern Christian Leadership Conference (SCLC) in Alabama, with fellow members as notable as Martin Luther King Jr. Orange was described as always having his "groupies" around him, which consisted of not only older like-minded people, but young people he was mentoring. He immediately became extremely involved and headstrong in the group. Orange got to work organizing the store picketing protest. Being inspired and ready for action, Orange directed everyone to picket inside the store, not realizing the norm was to protest outside. For this, he was arrested. Orange was frequently known as "Shackdaddy." This term was coined to him by Martin Luther King Jr. because Orange "shacked" communities together in the spirit of inspiration and action. Additionally, Orange always called people that worked with him "leaders," even those who he was instructing. When asked about this, he said that calling everyone a leader anointed them with a mission to make the world more just.

The SCLC were famous for going city to city trying to spread their message of nonviolence. Often, the group would target gangs in the area and try to convince them to reverse their violent ways. On one occasion, Orange attempted to separate a violent gang action by preaching a message of positivity and ended up with a broken nose. Additionally, Orange was a bit of a singer. Himself and his fellow SCLC members would often sing grassroots songs of freedom and inspiration in an attempt to sway listeners to the side of nonviolent protesting. In addition to his preachings of nonviolence, Orange also worked to encourage fearful African Americans to register to vote and be more active in politics.

As part of his civil rights work for the SCLC in Alabama, he was arrested and jailed prior to conviction in 1965 for contributing to the delinquency of minors by enlisting them to work in voter registration drives and for encouraging them to sing freedom songs at the courthouse. His detention in Perry County, Alabama, sparked fears that he would be lynched, and a protest march was organized to support him.

During that march on February 18, 1965, an Alabama state trooper fatally shot a young man, Jimmie Lee Jackson, in the stomach. In 2007, a former trooper named James B. Fowler, 74, was indicted for the death of Jackson. Living witnesses and tapes of the day of the killing were expected to be used at his trial.

The 1965 uproar over Jackson's shooting during Orange's incarceration soon led to the famed Selma to Montgomery marches, including the infamous police brutality on "Bloody Sunday", and the passage of the Voting Rights Act later that year.

In 1968, Orange was invited to attend the well-known Poor-People's Campaign, where thousands of homeless people camped out in front of the White House in an act of protest. That same year, Orange was standing at the bottom of the staircase of the Lorraine Hotel, only feet away from Martin Luther King Jr., who moments later, was shot and killed.

== Later work ==
Orange was a project coordinator at the Southern Christian Leadership Conference from 1965 to 1970, then later became a regional coordinator with the AFL-CIO in Atlanta, Georgia. He worked on at least 300 labor-organizing campaigns in that role.

In 1977, Orange worked on the organizing campaign of the Amalgamated Clothing and Textile Workers Union and won union representation and benefits for the workers at J.P. Stevens textile and clothing factories. After that success, Orange was assigned to the AFL-CIO Industrial Union Department until 1996, when he joined their Atlanta field office.

In 2006, Orange worked on Cynthia McKinney's attempt to regain her congressional seat, and appeared at the April 1, 2006 rally against the Iraq War in Atlanta.

Since 1995, Orange had served as the founder and general coordinator for the Martin Luther King Jr. March Committee-Africa/African American Renaissance Committee, Inc., which coordinated commemorative events honoring King and promoted commercial ties between Atlanta and other United States locations and South Africa.

In 2004, Orange protested the interruption of Atlanta's King commemorations due to an uninvited appearance by George W. Bush. Secret Service agents had initially planned to force organizers to cut their agenda short to accommodate Bush, whose plans included a photo opportunity of laying a wreath in honor of King before attending a major Republican Party fundraiser. After black leaders threatened to lock themselves into the site in question, an historic black church, the Secret Service permitted their symposium to go on, but with limited public access.

I feel disrespected by the administration and the Secret Service. On Dr. King's birthday last year, his administration initiated plans to gut affirmative action. Here we are a year later, and the same person who tried to turn back the clock on me wants to use Dr. King's birthday because it's an election year.

— James Orange, The New York Times, January 15, 2005

According to a fellow activist speaking shortly after his death, "He stayed active right up until the end... The Martin Luther King celebration this year fell on the 21st [of January, 2008]. He was still conducting it from his hospital bed. If you wanted something... he was still calling the shots."

== Death ==
At the time of his death in February, 2008, at Atlanta's Crawford Long Hospital, Orange was recovering from gallbladder surgery. Orange had had a triple heart bypass operation about six years before his death, and his health had declined over the years, despite his robust physique. Even on his deathbed, he was telling friends about more work they needed to do in the community to combat racial injustice. He died at age 65 at Crawford Long Hospital in Atlanta after being admitted to the hospital for gallbladder surgery the previous week.

Orange's wife of 39 years, Cleophas, known as Cleo, survived him, as did three daughters and a son. His youngest daughter, Pamela Aquica Orange, died on March 11, 2007. His daughter Jamida Orange spoke to the press on behalf of the family at the time of his death.

== In popular culture ==
Orange is played in the 2014 film Selma by Omar Dorsey.

== See also ==
- Jimmie Lee Jackson
- Southern Christian Leadership Conference
