= Ella Joyce =

American actress (born 1954)

- Born: Cherron Hoye; June 12, 1954 (age 72); Chicago, Illinois, U.S.
- Education: Eastern Michigan University
- Occupation: Actress
- Years active: 1990–present
- Spouse: Dan Martin

Ella Joyce (born Cherron Hoye; June 12, 1954) is an American actress. She starred as Eleanor Emerson in the Fox comedy-drama series Roc, which originally ran from 1991 until 1994. Joyce also appeared in films Set It Off (1996), Bubba Ho-Tep (2002), Our Family Wedding (2010), Temptation: Confessions of a Marriage Counselor (2013) and Nina (2016).

== Early years ==
The daughter of an autoworker and a hairdresser, Joyce was born Cherron Hoye in Chicago, Illinois, and raised in Detroit, Michigan. She graduated from the Performing Arts Curriculum at Cass Technical High School, and went on to attend the Dramatic Arts program at Eastern Michigan University. When financial problems caused her to leave, she returned to Detroit, where she graduated from a business school and then worked as an executive secretary at General Motors. She supplemented the income from that job by reading scripts for director Lloyd Richards, who encouraged her to act on-screen. After she moved to Harlem, New York City, she worked as a word processor while she improved her acting skills. After she earned her first film credit in 1979, she changed her name to honor her mother and great-grandmother. She has studied with several professional mentors, and worked in many regional theaters across America and overseas.

== Career ==
=== Theater ===
Joyce began her career as an actress appearing on stage. Her theater credits include Fences (at the National Black Theater Festival), as well as Medea and the Doll, Steppin' into Tomorrow; she was the first to play the roles of Risa at the Yale world premiere production of Two Trains Running, Tonya in the world premiere production of King Hedley II, and Lily Ann Green in Crumbs from the Table of Joy, earning The Joseph Jefferson Award. Other stage plays in which she has appeared include Bossa Nova, Last Street Play (The Mighty Gents), Checkmates, Brothers, Sisters, Husbands and Wives, Don't Get God Started!, Louis and Ophelia, Split Second, Home, Not a single Blade of Grass, Odessa, Barefoot in the Park, and Anna Lucasta. She is a founder and performer at The National Black Festival in Winston-Salem, North Carolina. She has received numerous awards, nominations, and accolades for her performances in the theater, including the New York AUDELCO and the NAACP Image Nomination (for theater and television). She is also a recipient of the Spirit Of Detroit Award from the Mayor's Office in 1998. Joyce received Ovation Award for August Wilson’s King Hedley II for the role of Ruby.

=== Film and television ===
On television, Joyce made her debut appearing in an episode of Katts and Dog in 1990 and later made her big screen debut playing minor role in the 1992 comedy film, Stop! Or My Mom Will Shoot From 1991 to 1994 she starred alongside Charles S. Dutton in the Fox comedy-drama series, Roc. In 1995 she starred in the pilot episode of NBC sitcom NewsRadio, playing the part that eventually went to Khandi Alexander. She made a cameo appearance in the music video for TLC's "Waterfalls" later that year. She later made guest-starring appearances in The Client, Dangerous Minds, Seinfeld, The Jamie Foxx Show and Eve. From 2003 to 2004 she played the recurring role of Jasmine Scott in the ABC sitcom My Wife & Kids.

In 1996, Joyce co-starred in the crime action film Set It Off directed by F. Gary Gray. She starred in the made-for-television film Selma, Lord, Selma (1999) playing Sheyann Webb's mother. In 2001 she starred alongside Yolonda Ross in the prison drama Stranger Inside and was featured in Debbie Allen-directed and starring comedy-drama The Old Settler. The following year she starred in the horror-comedy film Bubba Ho-Tep starring alongside Bruce Campbell and Ossie Davis. She later appeared in films Forbidden Fruits (2006) alongside Keith David, Lost Signal (2006), Who Made the Potatoe Salad? (2006), Preacher's Kid (2010), Our Family Wedding (2010), Hopelessly in June (2011) and California Solo (2012). In 2023, Joyce starred in the Tyler Perry's romantic drama film Temptation: Confessions of a Marriage Counselor playing the role of Jurnee Smollett's mother. In 2016 she appeared as Clifton's mother in the biographical film Nina.

In 2013, Joyce starred alongside Keith David in the short-lived TV One sitcom Belle's. She had supporting roles in films Resolution Song (2018) and Never and Again (2021). In 2022 she was cast as Tami Roman's character's mother in the BET drama series, Haus of Vicious.

== Personal life ==
Joyce married actor Dan Martin. She has written her first book Kink Phobia, Journey Through a Black Woman's Hair.

== Filmography ==
=== Film ===
Year	Title	Role	Notes
1992	Stop! Or My Mom Will Shoot	McCabe	
1994	Reality Bites	Libby Cumba	
1996	Set It Off	Det. Geraldine Waller	
1999	Her Married Lover	Dr. Ella Solomon	
1999	Frozen Hot	Atty. Jean Ross	
2000	Clockin' Green	Sonya Brignone	Video
2002	Bubba Ho-Tep	Nurse Joyceline Bridges	
2003	Salvation	Auntie Reed	Short film
2005	Uncle P	Bertha Miller	
2006	Forbidden Fruits	Minister's Wife	
2006	Who Made the Potatoe Salad?	Mrs. Jenkins	
2006	Lost Signal	Nancy Caulderbank	
2007	City Teacher	Anita Sawyer	
2008	A Simple Promise	Mary James	
2009	Busted	Ms. Lucille Watts	
2010	Preacher's Kid	Sister Pauletta Watkins	
2010	Our Family Wedding	Earlene Boyd	
2011	Hopelessly in June	Mrs. Rita Myers	
2011	Saybrook: The Truly Girls	Young Janet Tully – Mary Gloyd Warner	
2012	California Solo	Carol Weathers	
2013	Temptation: Confessions of a Marriage Counselor	Ms. Sarah	
2015	Lucky Girl	Melanie Jackson	
2016	Juney Smith's Black American Film Collection	City Teacher	
2016	Nina	Clifton's Mom	
2017	Sweet Dreams, Momma	Denise	Short film
2018	Resolution Song	Edith	
2019	Heavenly Deposit	Nurse Edna Williams	
2020	When We Kill the Creators	Billie	
2021	Never and Again	Mrs. Donna	
2021	All the Men in My Life	Jackie Helms	
2022	Holiday Hideaway	Rose	
2022	Catfish Christmas	Helen	
2022	First	Janice	

=== Television ===
Year	Title	Role	Notes
1990	Katts and Dog	-	Episode: "Officer Down"
1991–94	Roc	Eleanor Emerson	Main Cast
1994	Soul Train	Herself/Guest Host	Episode: "Lisa Lisa/Masta Ace/Smooth Sylk"
1995	NewsRadio	Catherine Duke	Episode: "Pilot"
1995	The Client	Alice Ward	Episode: "Them That Has..."
1996	Dangerous Minds	Judge	Episode: "Pilot"
1996	Sabrina the Teenage Witch	Mrs. Patrice Bogzigian	Episode: "Bundt Friday"
1997	Seinfeld	Dean Patrice Jones	Episode: "The Voice"
1998	The Jamie Foxx Show	Annabeth	Episode: "Convent-ional Gifts"
1998	In the House	Porsche Langford	Episode: "My Pest Friend's Wedding"
1999	Selma, Lord, Selma	Betty Webb	Television film
2001	Stronger Inside	Doodle Alderidge	Television film
2001	The Old Settler	Waitress	Television film
2002	What About Your Friends: Weekend Getaway	Juanita	Television film
2003–04	My Wife and Kids	Jasmine Scott	Recurring Cast: Season 4–5
2004–05	Eve	Mama Netta Pearl	Recurring Cast: Season 2
2013	Belle's	Gladys Crawford	Main Cast
2015	Being Mary Jane	Sheila	Episode: "Sparrow"
2016	Future You	Henrietta	Episode: "Internet Casualties"
2017	Bronzeville	Madame Marie	Episode: "2, 11, 75"
2020	Casting the Net	Mabel Singer	Recurring Cast
2022	Haus of Vicious	Carolyn	Main Cast
