= Amelia Boynton Robinson =

American civil rights activist (1905–2015)

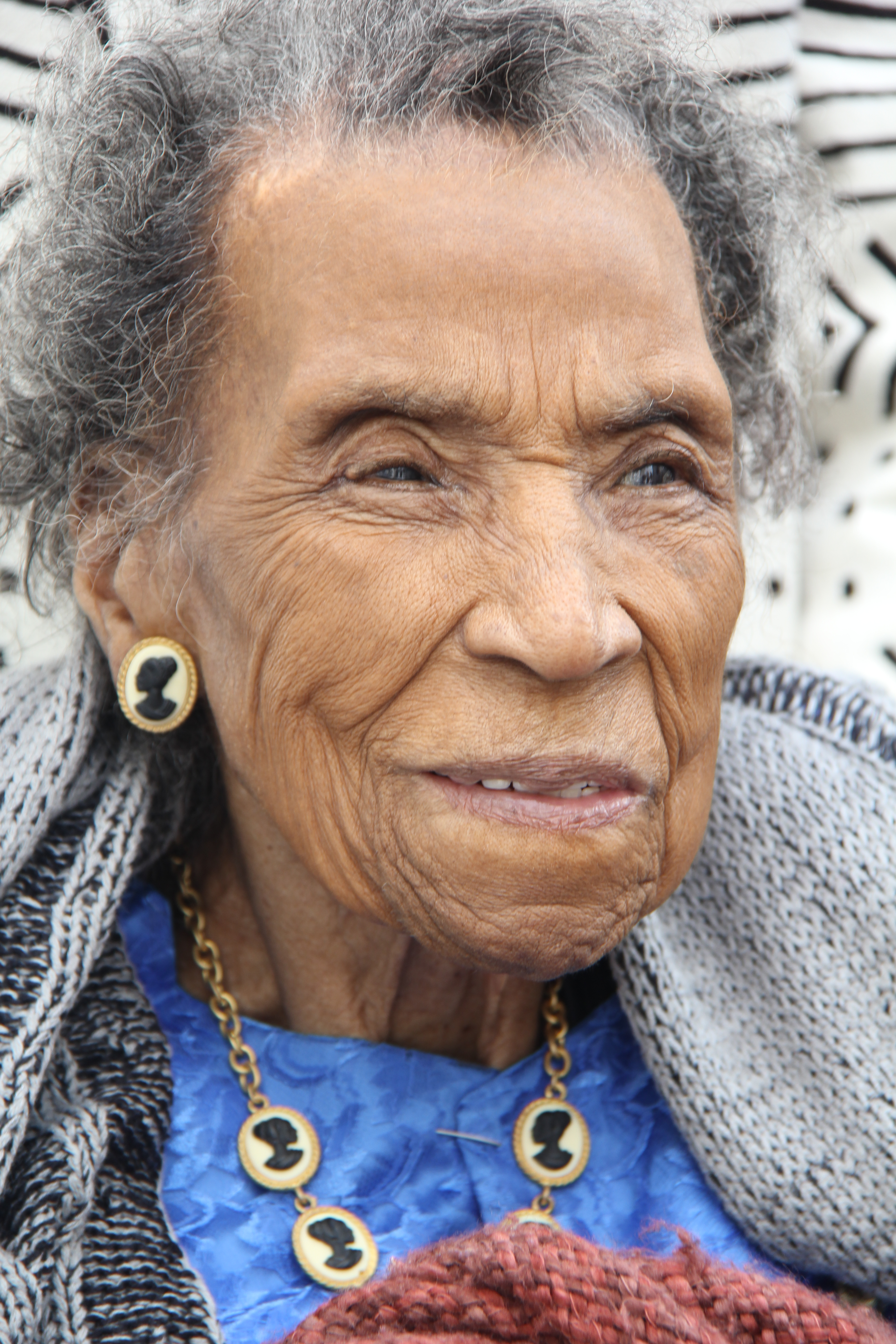
- Robinson in 2015
- Born: Amelia Isadora Platts; August 18, 1905; Savannah, Georgia, U.S.
- Died: August 26, 2015 (aged 110); Montgomery, Alabama, U.S.
- Known for: Selma to Montgomery marches
- Movement: Civil Rights Movement
- Spouses: Samuel W. Boynton (m. 1936; died 1963) Bob Billups (m. 1969; died 1973) James Robinson (m. 1976; died 1988)
- Children: Bill Boynton Jr. and Bruce Carver Boynton
- Awards: Martin Luther King Jr. Freedom Medal (1990)

Amelia Isadora Platts Boynton Robinson (August 18, 1905 – August 26, 2015) was an American activist and supercentenarian who was a leader of the American Civil Rights Movement in Selma, Alabama, and a key figure in the 1965 Selma to Montgomery marches.

In 1984, she became founding vice-president of the Schiller Institute, which was affiliated with Lyndon LaRouche, a far-right activist. She was awarded the Martin Luther King Jr. Freedom Medal in 1990.

== Early life ==
Amelia Isadora Platts was born in Savannah, Georgia, to George and Anna Eliza (née Hicks) Platts, both of whom were African-American. She also had Cherokee and German ancestry. Church was central to Amelia and her nine siblings' upbringing. As a young girl, she became involved in campaigning for women's suffrage. Her family encouraged the children to read. Amelia attended two years at Georgia State Industrial College for Colored Youth (now Savannah State University, a historically black college). She transferred to Tuskegee Institute (now Tuskegee University), earning a degree in home economics in 1927. (Platts later also studied at Tennessee State, Virginia State, and Temple University.)

== Career and civil rights ==
External videos
- “Eyes on the Prize; Interview with Amelia Boynton Robinson” conducted in 1985 for the Eyes on the Prize documentary.

Platts taught in Georgia before starting with the U.S. Department of Agriculture (USDA) in Selma as the home demonstration agent for Dallas County. She educated the county's largely rural population about food production and processing, nutrition, healthcare, and other subjects related to agriculture and homemaking.

She met her future husband, Samuel William Boynton, in Selma, where he was working as a county extension agent during the Great Depression. They married in 1936 and had two sons, Bill Jr. and Bruce Carver Boynton. Her son, Bruce Carver Boynton, was the godson and namesake of George Washington Carver. Later they adopted Amelia's two nieces Sharon (Platts) Seay and Germaine (Platts) Bowser. Amelia and Samuel had known the noted scholar George Washington Carver at the Tuskegee Institute, from which they both graduated.

In 1934, Amelia Boynton registered to vote, which was extremely difficult for African Americans to accomplish in Alabama, due to discriminatory practices under the state's disenfranchising constitution passed at the turn of the century. It had effectively excluded most blacks from politics for decades, an exclusion that continued into the 1960s. A few years later she wrote a play, Through the Years, which told the story of the creation of Spiritual music and a former slave who was elected to Congress during Reconstruction, based on her father's half-brother Robert Smalls, in order to help fund a community center in Selma, Alabama. In 1954, the Boyntons met Reverend Martin Luther King Jr., and his wife, Coretta Scott King at the Dexter Avenue Baptist Church in Montgomery, Alabama, where King was the pastor.

In 1958, her son, Bruce Boynton, was a student at Howard University School of Law when he was arrested while attempting to purchase food at the white section of a bus terminal in Richmond, Virginia. Arrested for trespassing, Bruce Boynton was found guilty in state court of a misdemeanor and fined, which he appealed and lost until the case, Boynton v. Virginia, was argued before the U.S. Supreme Court by Thurgood Marshall, reversing lower court decisions.

In 1963, Samuel Boynton died. It was a time of increased activism in the Civil Rights Movement. Amelia made her home and office in Selma a center for strategy sessions for Selma's civil rights battles, including its voting rights campaign. In 1964, Boynton ran for the Congress from Alabama, hoping to encourage black registration and voting. She was the first female African American to run for office in Alabama and the first woman of any race to run for the ticket of the Democratic Party in the state. She received 10% of the vote. She was also part of the steering committee of the Dallas County Voters League, becoming part of the "courageous eight".

In late 1964 and early 1965, Boynton worked with Martin Luther King Jr., Diane Nash, James Bevel, and others of the Southern Christian Leadership Conference (SCLC) to plan demonstrations for civil and voting rights. While Selma had a population that was 50 percent black, only 300 of the town's African-American residents were registered as voters in 1965, after thousands had been arrested in protests. By March 1966, after passage of the Voting Rights Act of 1965, 11,000 were registered to vote.

To protest continuing segregation and disenfranchisement of blacks, in early 1965 Amelia Boynton helped organize a march to the state capital of Montgomery, initiated by James Bevel, which took place on March 7, 1965. Led by John Lewis, Hosea Williams and Bob Mants, and including Rosa Parks and others among the marchers, the event became known as Bloody Sunday when county and state police stopped the march and beat demonstrators after they crossed the Edmund Pettus Bridge into Dallas County. Boynton was beaten unconscious; a photograph of her lying on Edmund Pettus Bridge went around the world.

Then they charged. They came from the right. They came from the left. One [of the troopers] shouted: 'Run!' I thought, 'Why should I be running?' Then an officer on horseback hit me across the back of the shoulders and, for a second time, on the back of the neck. I lost consciousness.

— Amelia Boynton Robinson, 2014 interview

Boynton suffered throat burns from the effects of tear gas. She participated in both of the subsequent marches. Another short march led by Martin Luther King Jr. took place two days later; the marchers turned back after crossing the Pettus Bridge. Finally, with federal protection and thousands of marchers joining them, a third march reached Montgomery on March 24, entering with 25,000 people.

The events of Bloody Sunday and the later march on Montgomery galvanized national public opinion and contributed to the passage of the Voting Rights Act of 1965; Boynton was a guest of honor at the ceremony when President Lyndon Johnson signed the Voting Rights Act into law in August of that year.

== Later life ==
Boynton remarried in 1969, to a musician named Bob W. Billups. He died unexpectedly in a boating accident in 1973. Amelia Boynton eventually married a third time, to former Tuskegee classmate James Robinson in 1976. She moved with him to his home in Tuskegee after the wedding. James Robinson died in 1988.

In 1983, Robinson met Lyndon LaRouche, considered a highly controversial political figure in the Democratic Party. A year later she served as a founding board member of the LaRouche-affiliated Schiller Institute. LaRouche was later convicted in 1988 of mail fraud involving twelve counts, over a ten-year period, totaling $280,000. In 1991, the Schiller Institute published a biography of Robinson, who even into her 90s was described as "LaRouche's most high-profile Black spokeswoman."

In 1992, proclamations of "Amelia Boynton Robinson Day" in Seattle and in the state of Washington were rescinded when officials learned of Robinson's involvement in the Schiller Institute. It was the first time the state had pulled back such an honor. A spokesman for the Seattle mayor said,

It was a very difficult decision. The mayor has a lot of respect for her courage during the Civil Rights Movement of the 1960s, but we don't feel her handlers gave us full and accurate information about her current activities.

Robinson said in an interview,

I have had worse things than that done to me when I was fighting for people's right to vote. I have been called rabble-rouser, agitator. But because of my fighting, I was able to hand to the entire country the right for people to vote. To give me an honor and rescind it because I am fighting for justice and for a man who has an economic program that will help the poor and the oppressed ... if that is the reason, then I think they did more good than they did harm.

According to the Associated Press, she said that people got the wrong image of LaRouche because government leaders were spreading lies about him."

In 2004, Robinson sued The Walt Disney Company for defamation, asking for between $1 and $10 million in damages. She contended that the 1999 TV movie Selma, Lord, Selma, a docudrama based on a book written by two young participants in Bloody Sunday, falsely depicted her as a stereotypical "black Mammy," whose key role was to "make religious utterances and to participate in singing spirituals and protest songs." She lost the case.

In June 2007, Robinson attended the funeral of former Dallas County Sheriff Jim Clark, who had once beaten and arrested her in 1965 during the Selma to Montgomery marches. When asked about her lack of hatred for a person who had committed egregious acts against her and fellow protestors, Robinson explained that:

As the Bible says, 'Everybody’s your brother. Love your brother as you do yourself. Do good unto those who do harm to you.' And I look at Jim Clark as I do all of the other racists: Those people may not be totally responsible. Because they are weak and they live according to the way that they were trained. Many of them conceived in the bed of hated, and rocked in the cradle of discrimination. And when people come up like that, you have to blame the background as much as blaming the weakness of them. And there are so many people who are like that, particularly in the South, they are considered great leaders by the racists, and they succumb to whatever those racists want them to do, they will do it.

From September to mid-November 2007, Robinson toured Sweden, Denmark, Germany, France and Italy in her capacity as Vice President of the Schiller Institute. She spoke with European youth about her support for LaRouche (who had denied facts about the 9/11 attacks), Martin Luther King Jr., and Franklin Delano Roosevelt, as well as the continuing problem of racism in the United States, which she said was illustrated by the recent events in Jena, Louisiana.

Robinson retired as vice president of the Schiller Institute in 2009.

In February 2011, at the claimed age of 99, Robinson returned to her hometown of Savannah, to address students at Savannah State University.

After suffering a series of strokes, Robinson died on August 26, 2015, in Montgomery, Alabama. All the reports at the time of her death gave her age as 104, but a later report revealed that she was 110 at the time of her death. This age was later verified by the Gerontology Research Group. Her body was cremated and her ashes were scattered over the Alabama River.

== Legacy and awards ==
In 1990, Boynton (by then remarried and using the surname of Robinson) was awarded the Martin Luther King Jr. Freedom Medal. Her memoir, Bridge Across Jordan, includes tributes from friends and colleagues, including Coretta Scott King and Andrew Young.

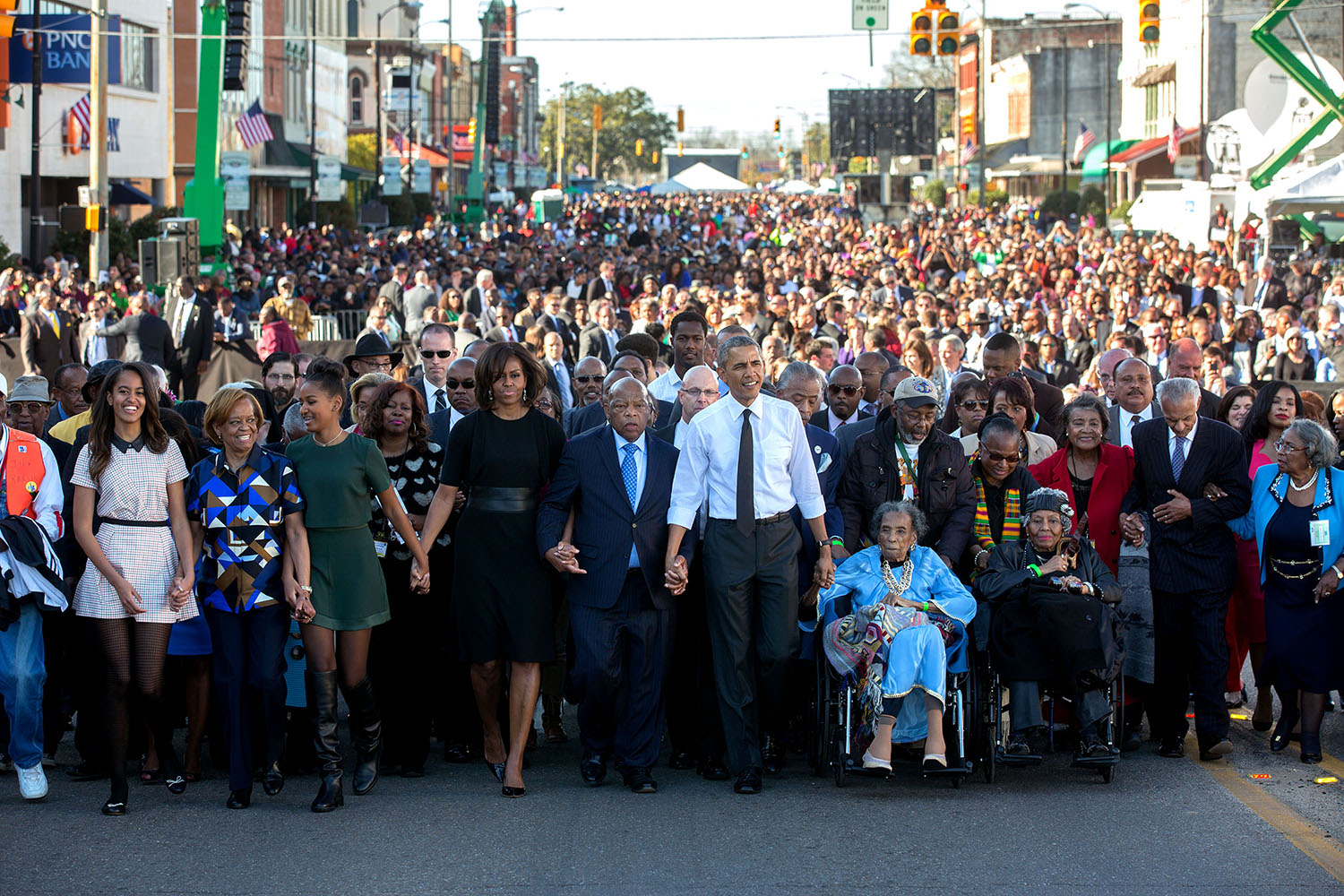
Amelia Boynton Robinson at the start of the procession across the Edmund Pettus Bridge on March 7, 2015, the 50th anniversary of Bloody Sunday. Robinson, wearing blue, is holding President Barack Obama's left hand; John Lewis is holding Obama's right.

King wrote:

In Bridge Across Jordan, Amelia Boynton Robinson has crafted an inspiring, eloquent memoir of her more than five decades on the front lines of the struggle for racial equality and social justice. This work is an important contribution to the history of the black freedom struggle, and I wholeheartedly recommend it to everyone who cares about human rights in America.

In 2014, the Selma City Council renamed five blocks of Lapsley Street as Boyntons Street to honor Amelia Boynton Robinson and Sam Boynton.

Robinson is played by Lorraine Toussaint in the 2014 film Selma, about the Selma Voting Rights Movement and its Selma to Montgomery marches. Robinson, then 109 years old, (Note: Although Moni Basu states that she was 103 years old, Alvin Benn subsequently found that she was born six years earlier, which the Gerontology Research Group has verified. Thus, she was 109 years old when the film debuted.) was unable to travel to see the film. Paramount Pictures set up a private screening in her home to include her friends and family. A CNN reporter was present to discuss the film and her experiences at Selma, and she said she felt the film was fantastic.

In 2015, Robinson attended the State of the Union Address in January at the invitation of President Barack Obama, and, in her wheelchair, was at Obama's side as he and others walked across the Edmund Pettus Bridge during the Selma Voting Rights Movement 50th Anniversary Jubilee that March.

== Bibliography ==
- Boynton-Robinson, Amelia (1991). Marianna Wertz (ed.). Bridge across Jordan. Schiller Institute. ISBN 978-0-9621095-4-6.
- Robinson, Amelia Platts Boynton (February 13, 1994). "Through the Years". Schiller Institute and Fidelio Online Home Page. "Musical Drama by Civil Rights Leader"

== See also ==
- List of civil rights leaders
