= List of Roc episodes =

Roc is an American television sitcom which ran on Fox from August 25, 1991 to May 10, 1994, over three seasons with 72 episodes produced.

== Series overview ==
Season	Episodes	Originally released	
Season	Episodes	First released	Last released
1	25	August 25, 1991	April 26, 1992
2	25	August 24, 1992	May 9, 1993
3	22	August 31, 1993	May 10, 1994

== Episodes ==
=== Season 1 (1991–92) ===
No. overall	No. in season	Title	Directed by	Written by	Original release date	Prod. code	U.S. viewers (millions)
1	1	"Pilot"	James Burrows	Stan Daniels	August 25, 1991	100	9.7
After a hard day's work collecting garbage, Roc Emerson looks forward to relaxing at home with his family. Instead he argues with his live-in father, Andrew, and finds his wife, Eleanor, leaving for her job as a nurse at the local hospital. Worse, his younger brother, Joey, whom Roc hasn't seen for five years, arrives at the door penniless, homeless, and unemployed.
2	2	"Son of Another Gun"	Andy Ackerman	Al Daniels	September 1, 1991	102	11.9
While Roc and Joey attend a baseball game, their father, visits Frankie, an old friend who is dying at a local hospital, To ease his guilt, Frankie confesses that he once had sex with Andrew's wife and may have fathered one of Andrew's sons. Outraged and furious, Andrew demands to know which son, but Frankie dies before he can reveal the truth. Guest star: Kurt Rambis
3	3	"Let's Tryst Again"	Stan Daniels	David Ankrum & Jack Lukes	September 8, 1991	103	15.2
Roc and Eleanor have no privacy in the house they share with Roc's father, Andrew, and his unemployed brother Joey. Joey's drinking and Andrew's constant coughing at night make it hard for Roc and Eleanor to concentrate on lovemaking. After an uneventful night of lovemaking, Roc and Elenor both agree that their nonsexual encounter was even more intimate than sex would have been.
4	4	"For He's Not a Jolly Good Fellow"	Andy Ackerman	Mert Rich & Brian Pollack	September 15, 1991	101	14.7
When Roc learns that Leon, a veteran garbage collector, is being forced to retire, Roc tries to comfort the old man. Thinking years of being alone and unappreciated have made Leon bitter, Roc decides to give Leon a retirement party to show how many friends he really has. Roc's father is hurt by the idea. He spent 35 years as a train porter, and no one ever throws him a party. Guest star: Dick Miller
5	5	"Musician, Heal Thyself"	Jeff Melman	Jeffrey Duteil	September 22, 1991	104	17.2
When unemployed trumpet player Joey can't pay his gambling debts, he begs his older brother for a thousand-dollar loan. Roc refuses to come to the rescue, even though Joey promises to change. As a test, Roc gets Joey a legitimate job with the sanitation department, and promises to pay the debt if Joey can keep the job for two weeks. Guest star: David Garrison
6	6	"Hearts and Diamonds"	Jeff Melman	Alan Daniels	October 6, 1991	105	14.5
Jealous when one of Eleanor's patients gives her flowers and a diamond necklace, Roc agrees to let him propose to test Eleanor's love. She is furious that he could think she would leave him for a wealthy man. They reaffirm their love, and Roc promises to get Eleanor nice things "someday." Guest star: Samuel L. Jackson
7	7	"How to Succeed at Garbage"	Stan Lathan	Franklyn Ajaye & Barry "Berry" Douglas	October 13, 1991	107	13.9
Roc is promoted to crew supervisor, a big step on his way toward an executive position. While Eleanor looks forward to the extra money every week, Roc's brother and father look forward to spending it on risky investments. Guest star: Charles Cyphers
8	8	"Can't Help Loving That Man"	Stan Lathan	Jeffrey Duteil	October 20, 1991	106	13.2
Andrew's reunion with his younger brother Russell throws the Emerson household into chaos when Russell announces that he plans to marry his gay Caucasian lover. Andrew, Roc, and Joey are overwhelmed by the sudden change in the man they thought they knew; Eleanor complicates things further by offering to hold Russell's wedding at the Emerson house. Guest star: Richard Roundtree
9	9	"He's Gotta Have It"	Stan Lathan	Rob Bragin	October 27, 1991	108	14.3
When nurse Eleanor invites co-worker Nadine Randall home for dinner, an immediate love-hate relationship develops between Nadine and Eleanor's unemployed brother-in-law, Joey. After only a few minutes of conversation, they agree that they hate each other's personalities, but can't resist the overpowering sexual attraction. Guest star: Olivia Brown
10	10	"Requiem for a Garbage Man"	Jeff Melman	Story by : Gene Miller & Karen Kavner; Teleplay by : Rob Bragin	November 3, 1991	109	13.7
While Roc looks forward to a reunion with several of his old army buddies, Andrew aims to enjoy a Sixties party at the community center. As Andrew unpacks his clothes from the 1960s and reminisces about the civil rights movement, Roc recalls the good old days with his friends in the army. Guest stars: Dan Martin and Gregory Alan Williams
11	11	"A Home, a Loan"	Stan Lathan	Jeffrey Duteil	November 10, 1991	110	14.7
Arguing the Emersons need a larger home, Joey suggests that they attend a bank auction that is selling homes with defaulted mortgages at bargain prices. Guest star: Louise Latham
12	12	"Rock-A-Bye Baby: Part 1"	Chuck Vinson	Alan Daniels	November 24, 1991	111	16.8
After four months of trying, Roc and Eleanor are afraid there may be a medical reason why they can't conceive a child. When Dr. Worthy reports that Eleanor has passed all the appropriate tests, the family looks silently to Roc. Guest star: Rickey D'Shon Collins
13	13	"Rock-A-Bye Baby: Part 2"	Jeff Melman	Mert Rich & Brian Pollack	December 1, 1991	112	15.6
After suffering the embarrassment of submitting a sperm sample to Dr. Martin, Roc learns that while his sperm count is healthy, they aren't "swimming properly." Dr. Martin recommends medication and weekly tests to rejuvenate the sperm. Roc is angry at himself, feeling he is a disappointment to Eleanor. Guest star: J. D. Hall
14	14	"Daddy's Girl"	Stan Lathan	Rob Bragin	December 15, 1991	113	14.0
Roc and Joey are shocked when their elderly father, Andrew, meets a beautiful young woman named Celia Miller at the neighborhood tavern. Not only does Andrew have sex with Celia at a nearby motel, he escorts her home and announces their engagement to her parents. Guest Star: Karen Bankhead
15	15	"What's Up Roc"	Stan Lathan	Jeffrey Duteil	January 5, 1992	114	16.6
Eleanor's mother, Margaret Carter, arrives at the Emersons unexpectedly. Margaret criticizes all three men of the house; Andrew a retired redcap, Roc a garbageman and an unemployed Joey for "treading water", or going nowhere in life. Margaret also reveals that she has told the rest of the Carter family that Roc is a doctor. When Eleanor falls ill before a planned wedding with her mother, Roc offers to go in his wife's stead, and Margaret insists Roc follow her lead. Roc is torn between being honest with others and proud of his garbageman's career as opposed to keeping his wife happy by getting along with his mother-in-law. Guest star: Rosalind Cash
16	16	"No Notes Is Good Notes"	Stan Lathan	Alan Daniels	January 12, 1992	115	16.3
Reverend Hill suggests that Joey Emerson, an unemployed musician, give trumpet lessons to some of the congregation's children. During the "lessons," Joey makes telephone calls, bets on horse races and gives his students no musical guidance at all. Then Roc promises Reverend Hill that Joey and his students will play in the church's next musical recital. Guest star: Chip Fields
17	17	"The Stan Who Came to Dinner"	Stan Lathan	Mert Rich & Brian Pollack	January 19, 1992	116	17.1
Roc 's boss Stan had a brief sexual encounter with a woman at a sanitation convention. Now Stan's wife Connie has thrown him out of the house. Roc gives Stan some honest advice and invites him home for dinner. But over the next few weeks, Stan asks Roc for too much emotional support and imposes on the Emersons for a place to sleep. Guest stars: Rhea Perlman and George Wendt
18	18	"The Hand That Rocs the Cradle"	Stan Lathan	Jeffrey Duteil	February 9, 1992	120	18.5
Joey, Andrew and Roc offer a meal to a pregnant homeless woman, Linda, who suddenly goes into labor in the middle of their kitchen. The baby is stillborn. Linda's husband, Donald, comforts his wife and promises to find work and shelter. Roc is so moved my their courage that he vows to show more concern for people who are less fortunate. Guest stars: Debbi Morgan and Tommy Davidson Note: this episode was initially broadcast live to viewers in the Eastern and Central time zones.
19	19	"Roc Strikes Out"	Stan Lathan	Mert Rich & Brian Pollack	February 16, 1992	117	16.4
Roc hopes his union's decision to strike against the city will only last a few days. When the strike enters week three and Roc has spent his small allotment from the union's emergency fund, he takes a job as a hospital orderly, working under the supervision of his wife, Eleanor.
20	20	"A Piece of the Roc"	Stan Lathan	Noah Taft	February 23, 1992	118	17.4
When Roc discovers that his new trainee is a beautiful woman, Angela Kimbro, he worries that he'll be too distracted by her looks to work. Angela quickly proves that she's as strong as any male sanitation worker. She also tells the horrified Roc that she's extremely attracted to him. Roc insists he loves his adoring wife, Eleanor. Still, Angela refuses to leave him alone. Guest star: Tisha Campbell
21	21	"The Lady Killer"	Stan Lathan	Rob Bragin & Alan Daniels & Dennis Pollack	March 15, 1992	121	16.0
After an evening of sex, Andrew discovers that the woman lying next to him is dead. He interprets this as an omen from his long-departed wife. Roc and Eleanor try to cheer him up by arranging a date for him with Helen, an attractive middle-aged nurse. As the four of them share a dinner, Andrew resists a friendship with Helen, afraid she'll be the next "victim" of this wife's revenge. Guest star: Margaret Avery
22	22	"Nightmare on Emerson Street"	Stan Lathan	Story by : Russell Sherman; Teleplay by : Rob Bragin & Alan Daniels & Dennis Pollack	March 29, 1992	119	16.7
When a gang of drug dealers move into a nearby house, Roc and Elenor try to organize their neighbors into a non-violent protest movement to scare them away. Roc suggests they picket and demonstrate loudly and continuously in front of the crack house, but the frightened neighbors fear retaliation from the gang. Guest stars: Clifton Powell and Tone Loc
23	23	"All That Jazz"	Stan Lathan	Mert Rich & Brian Pollack	April 5, 1992	123	11.8
Joey replaces temperamental trumpet player Kenny Davis in the Les McCann Band. During Joey's first performance with them, Kenny comes to listen and compliments him on his talent. Flattered, Joey loans Kenny his trumpet so he can play a song with the band. However, Kenny enjoys playing with his former group that he stays onstage the whole night. Guest star: Duane Martin
24	24	"Rock According to Roc"	Stan Lathan	James L. Crite	April 26, 1992	122	16.8
Mickey, Joey's bookmaker, offers him his ownership of an amateur singing quintet known as The Fly Guys. Joey convinces Roc to be The Fly Guys' new manager. However, instead of hiring a professional choreographer, Roc decides to save money and teach the guys dance steps from his own vocal group way back in the 60s.
25	25	"The Roc That Dreams Are Made Of"	Stan Lathan	S.L. Daniels & Susan Lumenello	Unaired. Shown October 28, 1994 on BET	124	N/A
When Eleanor wakes screaming from a nightmare, the rest of the family try to calm her by confessing their own worst nightmares. Alone with Roc, Eleanor tells the truth: she dreamed about the adult neighbor who cared for her when her parents were away. All these years, she has suppressed the memory of being molested as a child.

=== Season 2 (1992–93) ===
All 25 episodes are aired live to viewers in the Eastern and Central time zones.

No. overall	No. in season	Title	Directed by	Written by	Original release date	Prod. code	U.S. viewers (millions)
26	1	"Roc Throws Joey Out"	Stan Lathan	Jeff Abugov	August 16, 1992	201	13.6
Roc plans a day of surprises for Eleanor's birthday but the night is ruined when Roc's surprise gift arrives: a large painted portrait of Eleanor, but the artist has mistakenly painted a white woman instead of Eleanor. Then Roc loses all patience with Joey's irresponsibility and evicts him because he has taken advantage of his rent-free stay at Roc's home. Guest stars: Loretta Devine and Heidi Swedberg
27	2	"Car Wars"	Stan Lathan	Jerry Ross	August 23, 1992	202	12.2
When Joey is given free use of his friend's luxury car, Eleanor insists that Roc withdraw some of their savings from the bank so they can buy a car of their own. Guest star: Earl Billings
28	3	"Roc's Secret Past"	Stan Lathan	Maiya Williams	September 6, 1992	204	10.5
Attempting to prove her confidence in their marriage, Eleanor invites Roc's former girlfriend Janet over for dinner. When Janet reveals that she rejected Roc's marriage proposal only three months before he married Eleanor, Roc realizes that he never told that secret to Eleanor. Eleanor is furious with Roc because she now feels he married her before he had time to forget about Janet. Guest star: Candy Ann Brown
29	4	"Roc Works for Joey"	Stan Lathan	Orlando Jones	September 13, 1992	203	13.9
When Joey hires Roc to paint his friend's luxury condominium provided Roc allows him to act as "the Boss". Roc is mistaken for a burglar and arrested for what he sees as being a black man standing in a white neighborhood. Rather than try to change the prejudiced ways of the police, after being released, Roc pretends the incident never happened. Guest stars: Mitch Pileggi, Richard Gant and Lahmard Tate
30	5	"Andrew Dates Matty"	Stan Lathan	Nastaran Dibai & Jeffrey B. Hodes	September 20, 1992	205	13.9
To help her get promoted at the hospital, Eleanor asks Andrew to romance the head nurse, Matty. Andrew reports that his date with Matty was one of the worst evenings of his life, while Matty said that Andrew was the best lover she's ever had. Eleanor then learns that Matty reminds Andrew of his dead wife, so she convinces Andrew to explain his true feelings to Matty. Guest stars: Joan Pringle and Loretta Devine
31	6	"Choosing Your Friends"	Stan Lathan	Joe Fisch	September 27, 1992	206	15.9
While Joey tricks two famous jazz musicians into playing with him, Eleanor worries that Roc is getting too friendly with neighborhood vigilante Ronnie Paxton whose forceful methods 'took care' of the thief that robbed Andrew. Roc defends his right to choose his own friends, but when Eleanor threatens to stop having sex, Roc reconsiders. Guest star: Oscar Brown
32	7	"The Artificial Insemination Story"	Stan Lathan	Vince Cheung & Ben Montanio	October 11, 1992	207	14.2
When tests confirm his low sperm count, Roc asks Joey to donate his sperm. Roc does not want another man's sperm impregnating his wife, but he also realizes how passionately Eleanor wants to have a child. When they arrive at the hospital to begin the procedure, Roc suddenly changes his mind. He confesses that he wants to be genetically connected to his son and will continue more tests. Guest star: Loretta Devine
33	8	"Joey Messes Up"	Stan Lathan	Vince Cheung & Ben Montanio	October 18, 1992	208	13.7
When Joey learns that his new girlfriend just ended her affair with Miles Taylor, the piano player in his jazz band, he tries to prevent the jealous pianist from learning the truth by convincing his brother, Roc, to pose as her new lover. Miles confronts Roc, suspecting that Joey is lying to him. When Roc confesses the truth, Miles vents his anger at Joey and quits the band along with Curtis, the bass player. Guest star: Natalie Venetia Belcon
34	9	"1992 Presidential Election"	Stan Lathan	Story by : Jeff Abugov; Teleplay by : Joe Fisch & Orlando Jones	November 1, 1992	209	15.8
On the eve of the election, Eleanor, Andrew and Matty try to convince Roc and Joey to cast their ballots before the polls close. They are each pulling for a different candidate and stage a mock debate to help Roc choose whom to vote for. Roc and Joey finally realize every vote is important and run out to the polls to vote just before closing time. Guest star: Joan Pringle
35	10	"Roc and the Actor"	Stan Lathan	Maiya Williams	November 8, 1992	210	16.3
Ruben Stiles, a popular actor, uses Roc as the model for his role in a new movie. He quickly perfects an imitation of Roc's voice and movements, but Roc becomes upset. Ruben apologizes for embarrassing Roc. Several months later, the Emersons watch the movie on television and admire Ruben's accurate characterization of Roc. Guest star: Sinbad
36	11	"The Car Accident from Heaven"	Stan Lathan	Lisa Dunn-Dern	November 15, 1992	211	10.3
When Joey escapes serious injury in a car accident, Andrew foresees his own death and buys cemetery plots for himself and Joey, but not for Roc. Roc gets jealous and accuses his father of always favoring his selfish brother. Andrew explains that Roc has Eleanor to love him and bury him and Joey will always be a roving playboy with no one to care for his needs. Guest star: James Avery
37	12	"The Poker Game"	Stan Lathan	Richard Raskind	December 6, 1992	212	11.9
When Roc loses seven hundred dollars in a poker game, he stubbornly refuses Joey's offer to pay the debt for him. Reluctantly, Roc takes Joey's money and Eleanor announces that instead of a loan, they'll accept it as a repayment for all the years that Joey lived with them without paying rent or expenses. Guest star: Tone Loc
38	13	"Joey's First Fan"	Stan Lathan	Jerry Ross	December 13, 1992	213	12.9
Joey proudly encourages his musical protege, Devon Brown, until he learns that the young man is involved with Andre Thompson, the local drug dealer. Joey learns that Devon is earning tuition money by delivering drugs for Andre. Pleading with his prized student to stay away from Andre, Joey learns that Devon is addicted to the drugs as well. Guest star: Clifton Powell
39	14	"Dear Landlord"	Stan Lathan	Eunetta T. Boone & P. Karen Raper	December 20, 1992	214	15.0
When the Emerson's landlord wants to sell all of his rental properties, Roc and Eleanor invest their life savings to become the new landlords. Roc allows Joey to move back in with them if he'll work as Roc's new superintendent. Roc and Joey promise to forget their past disagreements. Guest star: Kadeem Hardison
40	15	"Second Time Around"	Stan Lathan	Ehrich Van Lowe	January 17, 1993	215	14.1
On the day that the Emersons are to renew their wedding vows, Eleanor gets upset when she learns that Roc is coaching her brother David on how to be more sexually aggressive. Meanwhile, Joey brings two dates to the wedding and attempts to let neither know that the other exists. Guest stars: Kim Fields, Rosalind Cash and Richard Roundtree
41	16	"Up in the Attic"	Stan Lathan	Nastaran Dibai & Jeffrey B. Hodes	January 24, 1993	216	14.0
When the Emerson brothers get a bit drunk, Joey confesses that years ago when young Roc was blamed for wrecking his father's car, it was he that accidentally released the brake causing the car to roll down the hill. For his entire life, Roc has felt guilty over this disastrous accident. He believes that Andrew never truly forgave him for it. Roc demands that Joey tell Andrew the truth. Guest star: Vicellous Reon Shannon
42	17	"Million Dollar Brother"	Stan Lathan	Mark Fink	February 7, 1993	217	13.2
Roc is offered a deal by a rich, white businessman to become partners in a waste management company. Roc later learns, however, that he is about to go into business with a racist who only wants to use Roc for PR purposes. Roc is forced to choose between money and pride. Guest star: Corbin Bernsen
43	18	"The Parent Thing"	Stan Lathan	Story by : Phil Berger & Stu Black; Teleplay by : Ilunga Adell	February 14, 1993	218	13.9
As Roc is giving boxing lessons to his friend's son, the boy confesses that his father is forcing him to be a boxer when he actually wants to be a ventriloquist. Roc advises his friend that a good father shouldn't force his child to satisfy his own unfulfilled dreams. Guest star: Allen Payne
44	19	"Joey in Love"	Stan Lathan	Joe Fisch	February 28, 1993	219	18.0
Joey is in love with an attractive singer in a local musical group, but selfishly insists that she quit the group when they're contracted for a six-month European tour. Roc explains to Joey that if he and Kim truly love each other, a temporary separation will only make their commitment stronger. In a rare unselfish act, Joey insists that Kim not disappoint her friends and supporters by quitting the group. Guest star: En Vogue
45	20	"Ebony and Ivory"	Stan Lathan	Maiya Williams	March 7, 1993	220	15.7
The Emerson family worries that Joey is being unfaithful to his girlfriend when they discover that he's dating a white woman and a black woman at the same time. His father thinks that Joey should respect his own race and only date black woman. Joey admits he's using the women's friendship to soothe his loneliness for his girlfriend Kim. Guest star: T'Keyah Crystal Keymáh
46	21	"You Don't Send Me No Flowers"	Stan Lathan	Vince Cheung & Ben Montanio	March 14, 1993	221	15.7
After an evening with the girls, Eleanor realizes that her marriage doesn't have much romantic fun. After a failed attempt by Roc of a night of romance, Joey reminds Eleanor how Roc shows his affection with all of the helpful things he does for her around the house. The couple agree to be more aware of each other's feelings and stroll outside for their moonlit walk. Guest star: Heidi Swedberg
47	22	"The Love Bug Bites Back"	Stan Lathan	P. Karen Raper & Eunetta T. Boone & Lisa Dunn-Dern	March 21, 1993	222	15.0
Roc and Eleanor invite their homeless friend, Linda, to the house for dinner and she immediately develops a mutual attraction with their neighbor, "Crazy" George. Roc and Eleanor help George and Linda to overcome their shyness and arrange for them to meet again. They are pleased they could help two lonely people meet each other. Guest stars: Jamie Foxx and Debbi Morgan
48	23	"Time to Move On"	Stan Lathan	Orlando Jones & Ehrich Van Lowe	April 4, 1993	223	12.6
The Emerson family is shocked to learn that Andrew is dating a young woman who looks exactly like his deceased wife. The brothers accuse their father of risking his health by going to wild parties with her. Andrew eventually realizes that he doesn't have any common interests with her. He goes back to his girlfriend Matty, who forgives him. Guest stars: Cylk Cozart and Deborah Lacey
49	24	"To Love and Die on Emerson Street: Part 1"	Stan Lathan	Richard Dubin	May 2, 1993	224	12.8
When "The Downtown Divas" return from a European singing tour, one of the Divas asks Roc to help prevent a local drug dealer, Andre, from murdering her brother. Moments after Roc confronts Andre, an unseen gunman shoots the dealer. Guest stars: En Vogue and Heavy D
50	25	"To Love and Die on Emerson Street: Part 2"	Stan Lathan	Ehrich Van Lowe	May 9, 1993	225	11.9
Roc realizes that Andre's gang may be out for revenge. He learns that it was his garbage truck partner Calvin who shot Andre to save the neighborhood from his influence. Though he doesn't approve of Calvin's actions, Roc takes up a collection for Calvin's legal defense. Guest star: Kelsey Grammer

=== Season 3 (1993–94) ===
No. overall	No. in season	Title	Directed by	Written by	Original release date	Prod. code	U.S. viewers (millions)
51	1	"Sheila in the House"	Stan Lathan	Ben Montanio & Vince Cheung	August 31, 1993	301	7.5
After Calvin is sentenced to prison for the attempted murder of a local drug dealer, Roc agrees to assume custody of Calvin's daughter, Sheila. Roc learns that Sheila is angry with her father for leaving her homeless. Roc explains to Sheila that Calvin believes he was protecting her and the other neighborhood children by committing the crime. Guest star: Heavy D
52	2	"Garbage Man's Apprentice"	Stan Lathan	Rob Edwards	September 7, 1993	302	8.6
When Roc's annoying neighbor George is hired by the Sanitation Department, Roc is assigned to teach him how to be a garbage collector. Meanwhile, Joey persuades the Emersons' foster daughter Sheila to use the computer's mathematical probability program to determine the winning horses at the racetrack. Guest star: Rick Scarry
53	3	"The Poker Hand That Rocks the Cradle"	Stan Lathan	Scott Sanders	September 14, 1993	303	7.8
When Eleanor's baby party interferes with Roc's weekly poker game, the expectant couple worry that the baby may interfere in their fun and romance. Then Roc loses the money for Eleanor's anniversary gift in a game. Guest star: Barry Shabaka Henley
54	4	"Joey the Bartender"	Stan Lathan	Thad Mumford	September 21, 1993	304	7.4
Charlaine hires Joey to be a bartender at her restaurant, but he quickly demonstrates his irresponsibility by transforming it into a gambling casino. Guest star: Jenifer Lewis
55	5	"Crime and Punishment"	Stan Lathan	Alison Taylor	September 28, 1993	305	6.5
When Sheila is out two hours past her curfew, the family worries; and when she shows up, saying she lost track of time at the movies, Roc and Joey have to punish her.
56	6	"Labor Intensive"	Stan Lathan	Mike Teverbaugh & Linda Teverbaugh	October 5, 1993	306	7.9
When Roc finally realizes the importance of prenatal care for the health of their baby, he obsessively pampers Eleanor with food, exercise and music. Meanwhile, Joey and Andrew meet Al Fontaine, a dishonest acquaintance who enjoys gambling on silly stunts and party games. Joey tries to win back a large wager that he lost to Al in the past but is unsuccessful. Guest stars: Eddie Griffin and Wren T. Brown
57	7	"Unforgiven"	Stan Lathan	Story by : Thad Mumford; Teleplay by : Rob Edwards	October 12, 1993	307	7.4
When Andrew's goddaughter Nina comes to town, Andrew warns Joey to stay away from her. Joey agrees. Nina takes a shine to Joey, and has him show her the sights of the city. Then Nina seduces Joey back at her hotel room, and Joey naturally gives in despite his better judgement.
58	8	"R.E.S.P.E.C.T."	Stan Lathan	Alison Taylor	October 19, 1993	308	7.5
Eleanor instructs Sheila on how to defend her dignity against sexist remarks made by a rude boy at school. Meanwhile, Andrew asks Joey to take his senior citizens group to the horse racing track. When Joey addresses the seniors about betting on horses, they criticize him for gambling instead of working at a job. Guest star: Montrose Hagins
59	9	"The Graduate"	Stan Lathan	Scott Sanders	November 2, 1993	309	7.8
Roc wants a management job with the Sanitation Department, but he's lacking one qualification, a high school diploma. When he learns that he can get his diploma by achieving a good grade on the GED Test, Roc prepares for the examination with the help of his family. Guest star: Jamie Foxx
60	10	"Final Analysis"	Stan Lathan	Rob Edwards	November 9, 1993	310	6.7
The therapist that Joey consults about his gambling addiction accuses Roc of being the problem. Meanwhile, Eleanor takes care of their crazy neighbor, George, when his guardian leaves town for a week. Guest star: Badja Djola
61	11	"He Ain't Heavy, He's My Father"	Stan Lathan	Vince Cheung & Ben Montanio	November 16, 1993	311	8.7
Roc wonders why Sheila refuses to visit her father, Calvin, in prison. Meanwhile, Eleanor's doctor offers to reveal the sex of her baby, which is due to be born at any time. She insists that she wants to be surprised during the birth, but Roc is impatient to know what kinds of baby clothes and toys he should scavenge from his garbage route. Guest stars: Countess Vaughn, Malinda Williams and Heavy D
62	12	"God Bless the Child"	Stan Lathan	Linda Teverbaugh & Mike Teverbaugh	November 23, 1993	312	7.3
When Roc and Eleanor bring their new baby home from the hospital, Eleanor's mother, Margaret, immediately accuses Roc of raising the child incorrectly. Meanwhile, Joey arrives home wearing an expensive new suit. After confessing that he won a large amount of money by gambling, Roc accuses Joey of ignoring his promise not to gamble. Guest stars: Karen Malina White, Rosalind Cash and Richard Roundtree
63	13	"Shove It up Your Aspirin"	Stan Lathan	Vince Cheung & Ben Montanio	December 7, 1993	313	7.5
When Roc is burdened with an excessive hospital bill for the birth of his baby and Sheila's fractured arm, he leads an angry protest against the hospital's pricing policy. Guest star: Max Wright
64	14	"Terence Got His Gun"	Stan Lathan	Alison Taylor	January 4, 1994	315	7.2
Roc and Eleanor are outraged when they learn that Sheila's new friend, Terence, carries a handgun to school to defend himself against the violent gang members. Meanwhile, Joey organizes his musician friends to fund their own music school to educate and occupy the neighborhood children. After the episode was over and before the closing credits, the lead star of the show, Charles S. Dutton spoke a passionate and powerful message about how the inner-city violence crisis in America should be stopped. Dutton also gave telephone numbers from crisis centers on the bottom of the screen for viewers that have been violence victims to call for help. Guest star: Brandon Adams
65	15	"Citizen Roc: Part 1"	Stan Lathan	Rob Edwards	January 11, 1994	316	7.3
Frustrated by the gang members and drug dealers in his neighborhood, Roc campaigns for political office to try and reduce the crime rate. Guest star: Luis Antonio Ramos
66	16	"Citizen Roc: Part 2"	Stan Lathan	Rob Edwards	January 18, 1994	317	7.4
A contributor to Roc's opponent may be linked to Andrew, who gets a visit from Roc's varied group of supporters. Guest stars: Badja Djola and Dick Anthony Williams
67	17	"No Place Like Home"	Stan Lathan	Story by : Scott Sanders & Jacqueline Davis; Teleplay by : Scott Sanders	February 1, 1994	314	5.3
With the arrival of the new baby, Andrew feels like a burden to the Emerson family and moves into the local senior citizens home. Joey volunteers to be the baby's guardian in Roc and Eleanor's will, and to prove that he isn't irresponsible, Joey cares for the baby in his apartment while Roc and Eleanor have a romantic evening together. Guest star: Paula Jai Parker
68	18	"The Concert"	Stan Lathan	Scott Sanders	February 8, 1994	318	6.6
Joey convinces Roc that he's learning to be more responsible when he produces a benefit concert for his new music school. Joey's efforts are threatened by a last-minute emergency, so his family lends him money—while worrying that the funds might really be going to a bookie. Guest stars: Toni Braxton, Queen Latifah and Lou Rawls
69	19	"The Last Temptation of Roc"	Stan Lathan	Ben Montanio & Vince Cheung	February 15, 1994	320	6.5
While attending a convention in Miami, Roc is romantically tempted by a former childhood friend, who is now a beautiful woman. Diane returns with Roc to the hotel lounge and they exchange a passionate kiss. Guest star: Salli Richardson
70	20	"Brothers"	Stan Lathan	Mike Teverbaugh & Alison Taylor	April 5, 1994	321	7.8
Andrew's gay brother visits and announces his plan to move to Paris with his boyfriend. Joey and Roc have a run-in with a drug dealer. Guest Star: Richard Roundtree
71	21	"Emerson vs. Emerson"	Stan Lathan	Linda Teverbaugh & Mike Teverbaugh	May 3, 1994	319	7.6
Eleanor tries to change Roc's bad habits; Joey seeks a date. Guest star: Art Evans
72	22	"You Shouldn't Have to Lie"	Stan Lathan	Story by : Richard Dubin & Phil Berger & Stu Black; Teleplay by : Richard Dubin	May 10, 1994	322	7.9
Roc gets Andre to help a young hood; Eleanor learns that a friend's daughter is HIV-positive. Guest stars: Clifton Powell, Rae'Ven Kelly and Victoria Dillard
