= Belle's =

- Genre: Comedy
- Created by: Ed. Weinberger; Miguel Núñez
- Starring: Elise Neal; Ella Joyce; Keith David; Miguel A. Núñez, Jr. Nadja Alaya; Tami Roman
- Composer: Bill Maxwell
- Country of origin: United States
- Original language: English
- No. of seasons: 1
- No. of episodes: 6

Production
- Executive producers: Ed. Weinberger; Jubba Seyyid; Miguel Núñez; Oscar Turner
- Camera setup: Multi-camera
- Running time: 30 minutes (excluding commercials)
- Production company: Gallery Road Productions

Original release
- Network: TV One
- Release: February 1 – April 1, 2013

Belle's is an American sitcom that ran on TV One from February 1 until March 1, 2013.

== Premise ==
The series encompasses the Cooper family who owns and operates an upscale soul food restaurant located in Atlanta. The series also encompasses widower William "Big Bill" Cooper as he moves on from his wife's passing and raises his two daughters: Jill and Loreta.

== Cast ==
- Keith David as William "Big Bill" Cooper
- Elise Neal as Jill Cooper
- Tami Roman as Loreta Cooper
- Ella Joyce as Gladys Crawford
- Miguel A. Núñez, Jr. as Maurice
- Nadja Alaya as Pam

== Episodes ==
No.	Title	Directed by	Written by	Original release date
1	"One Big Happy Family"	Unknown	Unknown	February 1, 2013
The restaurant is rented by the Crawford family to host their reunion and Bill is stressed by all the planning. Note: Cameron Mathison makes a guest appearance in this episode.
2	"Birthday Party"	Unknown	Unknown	February 1, 2013
Pam celebrates her birthday with a party. Bill agrees to a romantic weekend away. Note: Vivica A. Fox makes a guest appearance in this episode.
3	"The Intervention"	Unknown	Unknown	February 8, 2013
The family has an intervention for Aunt Gladys in order to prevent her from using lard in her recipes. Note: Dionne Warwick make a guest appearance in this episode.
4	"Whole Hog"	Unknown	Unknown	February 15, 2013
The restaurant has a pig roast that's planned by the Gourmet Society.
5	"True Love"	Unknown	Unknown	February 22, 2013
Jill discovers a new man and brings him over for dinner. Note: Richard T. Jones makes a guest appearance in this episode.
6	"Runaway Bride"	Unknown	Unknown	March 1, 2013
A bride who had cold feet arrives at the restaurant. Loreta surprises everyone by dating a man who is already married. Note: Wendy Williams and Gary Dourdan make guest appearances in this episode.
