= Barack Obama Selma 50th anniversary speech =

2015 speech by U.S. President Barack Obama

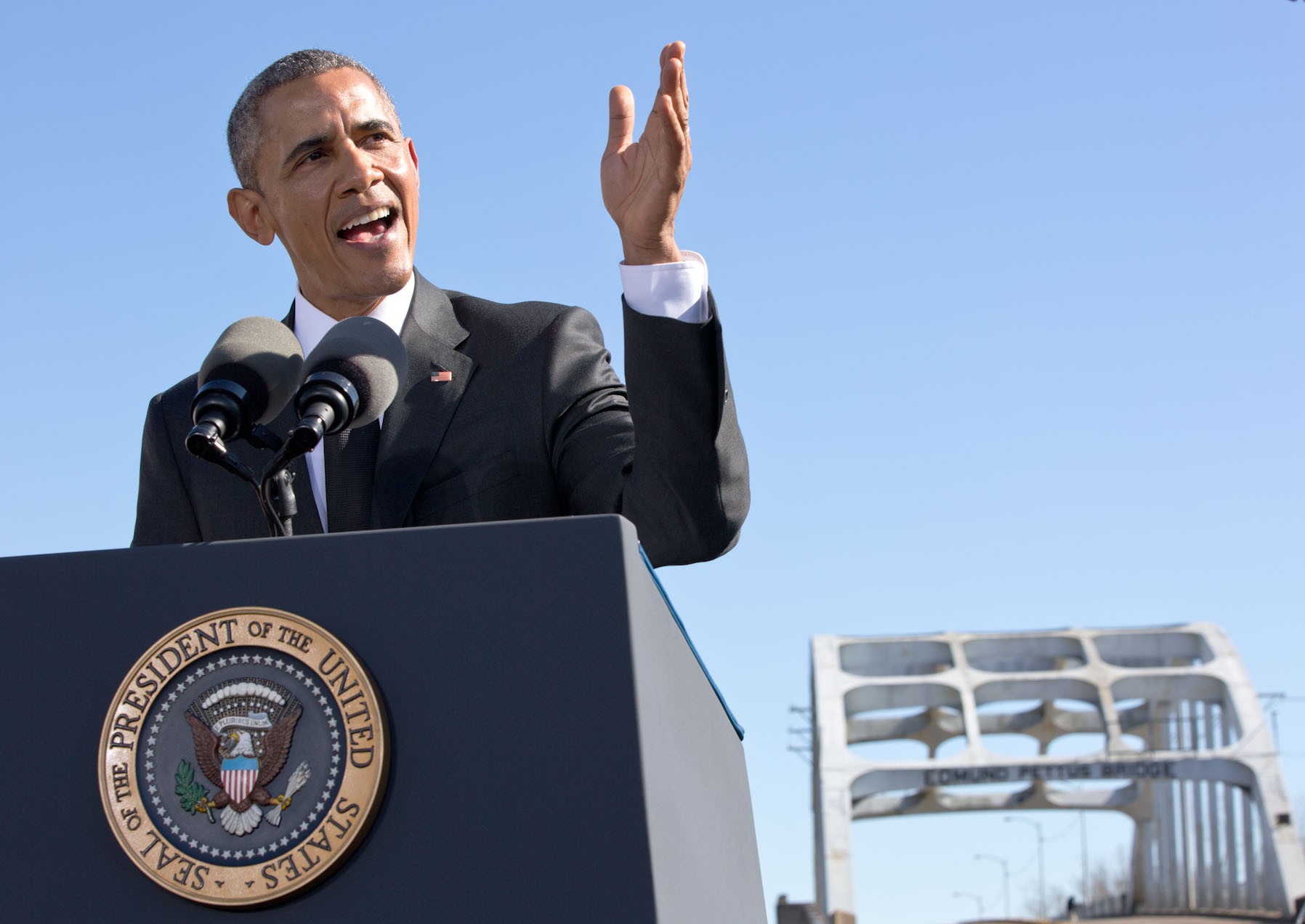
President Obama speaks at the 50th Anniversary of the Selma to Montgomery marches

Video of President Obama's speech

On March 7, 2015, President of the United States Barack Obama delivered a speech at Edmund Pettus Bridge to mark the 50th anniversary of the Selma to Montgomery marches on the subject of race relations within the United States. Among the estimated 40,000 present were former president George W. Bush, former First Lady Laura Bush, and Amelia Boynton Robinson, John Lewis, Diane Nash, Bernard Lafayette, and many other 'foot soldiers' who had taken part in the march in 1965.

On a podcast with Marc Maron in 2025, President Obama described his remarks as "the speech that is closest to my heart."

== Writing the speech ==
The formal writing process for the speech began on February 25, working closely with speechwriter Cody Keenan. In preparation, Keenan had read works by Taylor Branch and had been watching speeches by Rep. John Lewis. A few days earlier, former New York Mayor Rudy Giuliani had made remarks about whether President Obama loved America, leading Keenan to suggest that the speech focus on patriotism. The first draft was completed on March 5, two days before the address, and Obama instructed Keenan to add references to Ralph Waldo Emerson and Walt Whitman. The speech went through five drafts before March 7, with Obama still making tweaks on the flight to Alabama.

== Speech ==
Audio of the speech

Following an introduction by Rep. John Lewis, who was injured in the Selma to Montgomery marches, President Obama discussed the Selma to Montgomery marches in the context of historic events: "There are places, and moments in America where this nation's destiny has been decided, ... Selma is such a place". He spoke of how the marches led to the signing of the Voting Rights Act of 1965 by President Lyndon B. Johnson, "echoing their call for America and the world to hear: 'We shall overcome'".

Obama went on to discuss the denigration of those who marched: "Their faith was questioned. Their lives were threatened. Their patriotism challenged." He continued to assert the patriotism of such protesters asking, "what could be more American than what happened in this place?" He stated, "Selma is not some outlier in the American experience", but is "the manifestation of a creed written into our founding documents", quoting the Preamble to the United States Constitution:

We the People...in order to form a more perfect union.

We hold these truths to be self-evident, that all men are created equal.

Obama then addressed the motivations behind the Civil Rights Movement, an "American instinct that led these young men and women to pick up the torch and cross this bridge". The events at Selma, Obama argued, triggered popular movements for civil rights elsewhere in the world:

Young people behind the Iron Curtain would see Selma and eventually tear down that wall. Young people in Soweto would hear Bobby Kennedy talk about ripples of hope and eventually banish the scourge of apartheid. Young people in Burma went to prison rather than submit to military rule. They saw what John Lewis had done.

Continuing, Obama talked about the impact of campaigns such as the Selma marches, saying "the change these men and women wrought is visible here today in the presence of African Americans who run boardrooms, who sit on the bench, who serve in elected office from small towns to big cities; from the Congressional Black Caucus all the way to the Oval Office". The actions of activists meant that "the doors of opportunity swung open not just for black folks, but for every American".

Turning to the present day, Obama discussed the events of Ferguson, stating that the Department of Justice's report "evoked the kind of abuse and disregard for citizens that spawned the Civil Rights Movement." However he "rejected the notion that nothing's changed", citing the de jure, and practical, advances in civil rights on the basis of race, gender and sexuality. He also rejected that the "Ferguson is an isolated incident", saying "this nation’s racial history still casts its long shadow upon us." He described how, with "effort, we can make sure our criminal justice system serves all and not just some", and "raise the level of mutual trust that policing is built on". He referenced the killings of Michael Brown, Eric Garner, and Tamir Rice, saying "police officers are members of the community they risk their lives to protect, and citizens in Ferguson and New York and Cleveland, they just want the same thing young people here marched for 50 years ago — the protection of the law." He criticized "unfair sentencing and overcrowded prisons" and the circumstances which "rob too many boys of the chance to become men, and rob the nation of too many men who could be good dads, and good workers, and good neighbors."

He went on to discuss the present state of the Voting Rights Act, as a result of Shelby County v. Holder (2013): "the Voting Rights Act stands weakened, its future subject to political rancor." He praised the bipartisan efforts that contributed to the Act, citing the renewals of the bill that Presidents Reagan and Bush signed into law. He called upon the 100 members of congress present to "go back to Washington and gather four hundred more, and together, pledge to make it their mission to restore that law this year." Obama lamented low voter turnouts, asking: "How do we so casually discard the right for which so many fought? ... Why are we pointing to somebody else when we could take the time just to go to the polling places?"

He went on to discuss American exceptionalism, citing that America was "born of change". He listed individuals and groups who exemplified the spirit of restless change, and compared the Civil Rights Movement to other such campaigns, saying "We're the gay Americans whose blood ran in the streets of San Francisco and New York, just as blood ran down this bridge." He highlighted the community efforts required for change:

Selma shows us that America is not the project of any one person. Because the single-most powerful word in our democracy is the word "We." "We The People." "We Shall Overcome." "Yes We Can."

Obama then paid tribute to the activists whose work made later changes possible: "Our job's easier because somebody already got us through that first mile." He quoted Isaiah 40:31:

Those who hope in the Lord will renew their strength. They will soar on [the] wings like eagles. They will run and not grow weary. They will walk and not be faint.

Concluding his remarks, Obama drew on another quote from Isaiah, saying:

We honor those who walked so we could run. We must run so our children soar. And we will not grow weary. For we believe in the power of an awesome God, and we believe in this country's sacred promise.

== Response ==
=== Politicians ===
Former Obama speechwriter Jon Favreau hailed the speech as "certainly among [Obama's] very best." According to leading George W. Bush speechwriter Michael Gerson, the speech "falls into the category of speeches that every child should read in school."

=== Press ===
The speech was described in The New York Times as:

reminiscent of Mr. Obama’s 2004 address to the Democratic National Convention; his speech on race in Philadelphia during the 2008 Democratic primaries; and some of his more impassioned moments on the campaign trail.

The Washington Post opined that this speech would be most enduring in the history books.
