= Roc (TV series) =

American sitcom (1991–1994)

- Genre: Sitcom; Comedy drama
- Created by: Stan Daniels
- Directed by: Stan Daniels; Stan Lathan
- Starring: Charles S. Dutton; Ella Joyce; Rocky Carroll; Carl Gordon; Alexis Fields
- Theme music composer: Billie Holiday and Arthur Herzog Jr. (episodes 1–39); Denzil Foster & Thomas McElroy (episodes 40–72)
- Opening theme: "God Bless the Child" performed by Jerry Lawson (episodes 1–39); "Live Your Life Today" performed by En Vogue (episodes 40–72)
- Composer: Fred Thaler
- Country of origin: United States
- Original language: English
- No. of seasons: 3
- No. of episodes: 72 (1 unaired) (list of episodes)

Production
- Executive producers: Jeff Abugov; Charles S. Dutton; Joe Fisch; Vic Kaplan; Ehrich Van Lowe
- Camera setup: Multi-camera
- Running time: 22–24 minutes
- Production company: HBO Independent Productions

Original release
- Network: Fox
- Release: August 25, 1991 – May 10, 1994

Roc is an American television sitcom created by Stan Daniels that aired on Fox from August 25, 1991, to May 10, 1994. The series stars Charles S. Dutton as Baltimore garbage collector Roc Emerson and Ella Joyce as his wife Eleanor, a nurse.

== Live performances ==
The four principal cast members were all accomplished stage actors, and had become acquainted with each other while appearing in various August Wilson plays on Broadway. After a successful live episode (guest-starring Dutton's then-wife Debbi Morgan) was broadcast in February 1992, the producers and the Fox network agreed to air each episode of the second season as a live performance. A Fox executive reportedly said that Roc "didn't feel live" to audiences because "those actors were so good, they never made a mistake."

== Cast ==
=== Main cast ===
- Charles S. Dutton – Charles "Roc" Emerson, a garbage man
- Ella Joyce – Eleanor Carter Emerson, a night-shift nurse at Harbor Hospital (Wing C)
- Rocky Carroll – Andrew Joseph "Joey" Emerson Jr., Roc's freeloading, trumpet-playing brother
- Carl Gordon – Andrew Joseph "Pop" Emerson Sr., Roc's widowed father, a retired railroad porter

=== Recurring cast ===
- Garrett Morris – Wiz (Season 1)
- Vonte Sweet - Troy Babbit
- Clifton Powell – Andre Thompson
- Heavy D – Calvin Hendricks (Seasons 2–3)
- Tone Lōc – Ronnie Paxton (Seasons 2–3; 7 episodes)
- Jamie Foxx – Crazy George (Seasons 2–3; 9 episodes)
- Barry Shabaka Henley – Ernie (Seasons 2–3; 7 episodes)
- Darryl Sivad – Sly (Seasons 2–3; 6 episodes)
- Loretta Devine – Cynthia (Season 2; 5 episodes)
- Joan Pringle – Matty (Season 2; 4 episodes)
- Alexis Fields – Sheila Hendricks (Season 3)
- Rosalind Cash – Margaret Carter, Eleanor's mother (Seasons 1–3; 3 episodes)
- Richard Roundtree – Russell Emerson, Andrew's brother (Seasons 1–3; 4 episodes)

=== Guests ===
- Kim Fields - Ruth (Season 2), Eleanor's younger sister
- James Avery - Dale Hammers Episode: "The Car Accident from Heaven"
- Kadeem Hardison - Rev. Adams
- Debbi Morgan - Linda
- Tommy Davidson - Donald
- Samuel L Jackson - Larry

== Episodes ==
Season	Episodes	Originally released	
Season	Episodes	First released	Last released
1	25	August 25, 1991	April 26, 1992
2	25	August 24, 1992	May 9, 1993
3	22	August 31, 1993	May 10, 1994

== Reception and cancellation ==
Roc received generally positive reviews upon its premiere. Rick Kogan of the Chicago Tribune described it as having "heart, soul and sass", while Michael Hill in the Evening Sun wrote that it was "warm and funny and genuine". Howard Rosenberg, writing in the Los Angeles Times, was less enthusiastic, saying "the setup is rather routine sitcom fare" while praising the characters and the cast and calling the show "fairly promising". Janis D. Froelich in the St. Petersburg Times described it as "disappointingly just another sitcom, albeit one with polished acting."

Never a rating hit, Fox elected to cancel the show after three seasons, much to the anger of Dutton, who said that the cancellation "is very good proof that what little quality there is in television is reserved solely for white people." Fox had tried to move the show to Tuesday to package it with Martin to drive ratings, and Fox Entertainment president Sandy Grushow had stated his appreciation of the show while also saying it had run its course in trying to find an audience while Dutton contended the network had long before given up on trying to promote the show, particularly when he ran into conflict with the writers (who were mostly white).

=== Nielsen ratings ===
- Season 1: #72 – 8.95 rating
- Season 2: #71 – 8.91 rating
- Season 3: #102 – 5.10 rating
