= Selma, Lord, Selma =

1999 American TV film

- DVD cover
- Written by: Cynthia Whitcomb
- Directed by: Charles Burnett
- Starring: Mackenzie Astin; Jurnee Smollett; Clifton Powell; Ella Joyce; Yolanda King
- Music by: Stephen James Taylor
- Country of origin: United States
- Original language: English

Production
- Producer: Christopher Seitz
- Cinematography: John Simmons
- Editor: Nancy Richardson
- Running time: 94 minutes
- Production company: Walt Disney Television

Original release
- Network: ABC
- Release: January 17, 1999

Selma, Lord, Selma is a 1999 American made-for-television biographical drama film based on true events that happened in March 1965, known as Bloody Sunday in Selma, Alabama. The film tells the story through the eyes of a 9-year-old African-American girl named Sheyann Webb (Jurnee Smollett). It was directed by Charles Burnett, one of the pioneers of African-American independent cinema. It premiered on ABC on January 17, 1999.

== Plot ==
Sheyann Webb sees Dr. Martin Luther King Jr. going into Brown Chapel AME Church one day while playing outside with her friends. They are told that Dr. King has come to Selma, Alabama to help the Negro people get voting rights. Sheyann skips school to sneak into a meeting and meets Dr. King, and he reads a report that she wrote about him and is impressed by it and invites her to sing at another meeting later that night.

After school, Sheyann and her friend Rachel meet a pastor named Jonathan Daniels, who's staying in Rachel's house to help Dr. King with the movement, but the local minister Father Whitaker warns him about how dangerous it could be. Sheyann's mom scolds her for skipping school, but lets her go to the meeting anyway, where she introduces Rachel to Dr. King. He teaches her and Rachel (Stephanie Zandra Peyton) that when asked, "Children, what do you want?" their answer should be "Freedom." She then sings "Ain't Gonna Let Nobody Turn Me Around". After she gets home, her mom tells her dad about her interest in the movement, which starts to worry him.

The next day, Sheyann skips school again to march and they discover a cross was burned down, which Jonathan witnessed being done by the Ku Klux Klan, but couldn't report them to the police since there are no active Klan chapters in the area. Then Dr. King prays before they start marching to the courthouse to register, where they get harassed by the sheriff. He tells Sheyann to leave and arrests everybody else. When Sheyann gets to school, she convinces her teacher to start teaching them about freedom and gets the rest of the school to starting marching, too. After Jonathan gets out of jail, he, Jimmie Lee Jackson, and his friend Willie start going around town to get more people to march.

Jonathan tries to convince Sheyann's dad to join the movement, but he refuses after her older sister got arrested during a march and was sent up north. After Dr. King gets out of jail, he announces to everybody that "We're not going to take it anymore". Later that night, Jimmie Lee is killed by troopers while saving his grandfather from being beaten, and Dr. King holds a funeral for him.

Sheyann starts to become afraid that she'll die during the march, too, but her mom comforts her and tells her to be careful. To draw attention to the death of Jimmie Lee, Jonathan organizes a march to Montgomery to present a petition to Governor Wallace to protest that Negroes are not being treated fairly. On Sunday, March 7, 1965, a day that comes to be called Bloody Sunday, Sheyann and all the other marchers march over the Edmund Pettus Bridge en route to Montgomery, and are attacked by police. Sheyann gets traumatized, but Jonathan manages to get her home safe and her parents comfort her.

The next day in church, some of the marchers are hurt and scared, but Sheyann starts singing to them and manages to uplift them. When President Lyndon B. Johnson announces the Voting Rights Bill, Dr. King and the other marchers vow to continue marching, but Jonathan and Willie leave for Hayneville to get more people to march, and they get arrested for putting up signs.

Jonathan eventually gets released, but the gas station clerk who filled up his car before shoots and kills him on the street, leaving Sheyann heartbroken. Her teacher tells her not to get mad about it and be strong and keep fighting, and her father decides to go marching with her. Then she and Dr. King go marching to the Capitol again, and the police let them through.

On August 6, 1965, the President signed the Voting Rights Act into Law. Sheyann eventually started directing a youth program for children of all races in Montgomery. Rachel's brother became a two-term City Councilman. Each year, on the third Sunday in February, there's a memorial service in Marion for Jimmie Lee. In 1994, the Episcopal Church canonized Jonathan and included him in its Calendar of Saints.

== Cast ==
- Jurnee Smollett — Sheyann Webb
- Clifton Powell — Martin Luther King Jr.
- Mackenzie Astin - Jonathan Daniels
- Ella Joyce — Betty Webb
- Yolanda King — Miss Bright
- Elisabeth Omilami — Amelia Boynton
- Afemo Omilami — John Webb
- Brett Rice — Sheriff Pots
- Margo Moorer — Alice West
- Von Coulter — Tom West
- Laura-Shay Griffin — Sallie Parker
- Danny Nelson — Father Whitaker
- Faruq Jenkins — Willie
- Stephanie Zandra Peyton — Rachel West
- Zach Rogers — Jimmie Lee Jackson
- L. Warren Young — Hosea Williams
- Bob Banks — Reverend Frederick D. Reese
- Richard Reed — John Lewis
- Ebony Curry — Billy Vickers (CEO)
- Brandy Stanley — Extra

== Production ==
Selma, Lord, Selma is based on a book of the same name written in 1980 by Sheyann Webb, Rachel West and Frank Sikora. The full title is Selma, Lord, Selma: Girlhood Memories of the Civil-Rights Days. It was published by the University of Alabama Press in Tuscaloosa, AL. It is written in the style of memoirs by Sheyann and Rachel.

Selma, Lord, Selma was made into a movie. Walt Disney Pictures picked it up and on January 17, 1999, one day prior to the national holiday commemorating Dr. King's birthday, it was broadcast on the ABC television network. Dr. King's daughter Yolanda is featured in the film as Miss Bright, Sheyann's teacher who marches with her. Music composed by Stephen James Taylor, with vocals by Brides of the Wind.

== Reception ==
The Philadelphia Tribune praised the portrayal of Martin Luther King Jr. by Clifton Powell and the "…heart-wrenching performance" by Jurnee Smollett. The Boston Globe criticized it: "…never rises above the level of a Classic Comics version of civil rights history", while The Rocky Mountain News said: "(Selma) …offers a sense of authenticity…".

== Awards and nominations ==
In 1999, Cynthia Whitcomb, the author, was nominated for the Humanitas Prize. The category was Best 90-minute film. The winner was NYPD Blue. Selma, Lord, Selma also was nominated for an Image Award in 2000. The category was Outstanding Television Movie/Miniseries/Dramatic Special.

== See also ==
- Civil rights movement in popular culture
- Selma, a 2014 film featuring the Selma to Montgomery marches and some of the same events and characters.
