= Cynthia Whitcomb =

American screenwriter

Cynthia Whitcomb is an American television screenwriter and teacher. She has been nominated for numerous awards including the Emmy, the Edgar and the Humanitas Prize.

== Background ==
In 1969, Whitcomb graduated from Pasadena High School in Pasadena, California where she studied drama under Abel Franco. While she was a freshman at UCLA, Franco gave her one of her first professional writing assignments. She received $25 in advance and $25 upon completion to write, "Here," a spoof of the musical, Hair. However, the play was never produced due to censorship.

== Selected credits ==
=== Television ===
Year	Production	Network	Notes
1999	Selma, Lord, Selma	ABC	Adaptation of the 1997 book by Sheyann Webb, Rachel West and Frank Sikora. Nominated for the Humanitas Prize
1991	Mark Twain and Me	Disney Channel	Based on the book by Dorothy Quick. Nominated for the Humanitas Prize
1989	I Know My First Name Is Steven	NBC	Written with J.P. Miller. Nominated for an Emmy Award
1983	Jane Doe	CBS	Written with Walter Halsey Davis. Nominated for an Edgar Award
1981	Leave 'em Laughing	CBS	Credited as Cynthia Mandelberg and written with Peggy Chantler Dick. Nominated for the Humanitas Prize

=== Theatre ===
- Holidazed, Written with Marc Acito

Year	Production	Theatre	Notes
1982	Looking-Glass	Entermedia Theatre	Credited as Cynthia Mandelberg and written with Michael Sutton
2023	The Ghost of David Belasco	Lakewood Theatre (Lake Oswego, OR)	A farce in the vein of Noises Off and The Play That Goes Wrong
