= Bruce Boynton =

American civil rights leader (1937–2020)

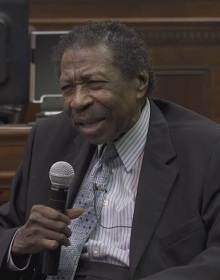
- Boynton in 2018
- Born: June 19, 1937; Selma, Alabama, U.S.
- Died: November 23, 2020 (aged 83); Montgomery, Alabama, U.S.
- Occupation: Civil rights activist
- Known for: Boynton v. Virginia
- Spouses: Alice Cutler (m. 1973; died 2001) Betty Strong Boynton (m. 2008)
- Mother: Amelia Boynton Robinson

Bruce Carver Boynton (June 19, 1937 – November 23, 2020) was an American civil rights leader who inspired the Freedom Riders movement and advanced the cause of racial equality through a landmark Supreme Court case, Boynton v. Virginia.

== Early life ==
Boynton grew up in Selma, Alabama. His parents were civil rights activists, known in their community as Mr. and Mrs. Civil Rights, because they participated in events like the Bloody Sunday march of 1965. His mother, Amelia Boynton Robinson, was beaten during demonstrations for voting rights in 1965, and 50 years later was honored by then-President Barack Obama.

== Boynton v. Virginia ==
In 1958, Boynton ordered a cheeseburger while sitting in a white only part of a restaurant at a bus station in Richmond, Virginia. He was arrested for trespassing after he refused to leave the restaurant and spent one night in jail. He was a law student at Howard University then and decided to fight his arrest in court. At trial, he was represented by Martin A. Martin. He lost his case, but decided to appeal, until finally, his case reached the U.S. Supreme Court. His case, known as Boynton v. Virginia, was argued by Thurgood Marshall, who later became a justice of the Supreme Court. The court overturned Boynton's conviction, affirming that racial segregation in public transportation was illegal.

In 2018 U.S. District Judge Myron Thompson said of Boynton: "He did something that very few people would have the courage to do. He said no. To me he's on par with Rosa Parks," referring to the Black woman who did not give up her seat in the front part of a segregated bus to a white man. Summarizing his impact, Thompson said, "All he wanted was a cheeseburger, and he changed the course of history."

Boynton's actions inspired the Freedom Rides in 1961, where activists rode interstate buses through the Southern United States to protest segregated bus terminals. While the Freedom Riders were arrested in a few southern states, including Alabama, Mississippi, and South Carolina, the actions prompted the then-President John F. Kennedy to pass orders for a strict enforcement of the federal anti-discrimination laws.

== Career ==
Boynton received a law degree from Howard University; however, Alabama refused to give him a law license for six years while they "investigated the circumstances" of Boynton v. Virginia. He was forced to move to Chattanooga, Tennessee, to practice law until Alabama granted him a license in 1965. He worked as a civil rights attorney for most of his career until he retired. He served as Alabama's first Black special prosecutor.

In 2018, Phillip McCallum, executive director of the Alabama State Bar, apologised for the delay in granting Boynton's license.

== Death and legacy ==
Boynton died on November 23, 2020, at 83, two weeks before the 60th anniversary of his landmark case. Former Alabama State Senator Henry Sanders announced his death. His daughter, Carver Ann Boynton, said the cause was cancer.

On the day he died, the Dallas County Commission of Alabama voted to rename an annex of the Dallas County Courthouse in Selma in honor of Boynton and another prominent black lawyer, J. L. Chestnut, Jr.
