= Murder of Jimmie Lee Jackson =

American civil rights activist (1938–1965)

Jimmie Lee Jackson
- Born: December 16, 1938; Marion, Alabama, U.S.
- Died: February 26, 1965 (aged 26); Selma, Alabama, U.S.
- Cause of death: Gunshot wounds
- Occupation: Farmer
- Organization: Southern Christian Leadership Conference (SCLC)
- Movement: Civil Rights Movement; Peace movement

Jimmie Lee Jackson (December 16, 1938 – February 26, 1965) was an African American civil rights activist in Marion, Alabama, and a deacon in the Baptist church. On February 18, 1965, while unarmed and participating in a peaceful voting rights march in his city, he was beaten by troopers and fatally shot by an Alabama state trooper. Jackson died eight days later in the hospital.

His death helped inspire the Selma to Montgomery marches in March 1965, a major event in the civil rights movement that helped gain congressional passage of the Voting Rights Act of 1965. This enabled millions of African Americans to vote in Alabama and across the Southern United States, regaining participation as citizens in the political system for the first time since the turn of the 20th century. Most had been disenfranchised since then by state constitutions and discriminatory practices that made voter registration and voting more difficult.

In 2005, former Alabama State Trooper James Bonard Fowler admitted to having shot Jackson, in what he said was self-defense soon after street lights had gone out and a melee had broken out. Former trooper Fowler was indicted in 2007 in Jackson's death. In 2010, he pleaded guilty to manslaughter. He was sentenced to six months in prison.

== Early life ==
Jimmie Lee Jackson was born in 1938 in Marion, Alabama, the county seat of Perry County, to Jimmie Lee Jackson and Viola Jackson, a local farming family. They all belonged to the Baptist church. He was named after his father. After his father died when Jackson was 18 years old, he took over working on and managing the family farm. He also had a daughter.

Although many sources claim he was an army veteran, and some say that he served in the Vietnam War, his family disputes that he was ever in the military. (The first U.S. ground troops arrived in Vietnam on March 8, 1965, so it is improbable that Jackson served in that war, and claims that he served overseas are unattributed.)

== Deacon and activist ==
After moving back to his hometown from Indiana, Jackson worked as a laborer and a woodcutter, earning six dollars each day he worked. Ordained in the summer of 1964, Jackson was the youngest deacon of his St. James Baptist Church in Marion.

Jackson had tried to register to vote for four years, without success, under the discriminatory system maintained by Alabama officials since the turn of the 19th century. His mother Viola and maternal grandfather Cager Lee had also attempted to register, also unsuccessfully. Jackson was inspired by Martin Luther King Jr., who had come with other Southern Christian Leadership Conference (SCLC) staff to nearby Selma, Alabama, to help local activists in their voter registration campaign. Jackson attended meetings several nights a week at Zion's Chapel Methodist Church.

=== Attack and fatal shooting ===
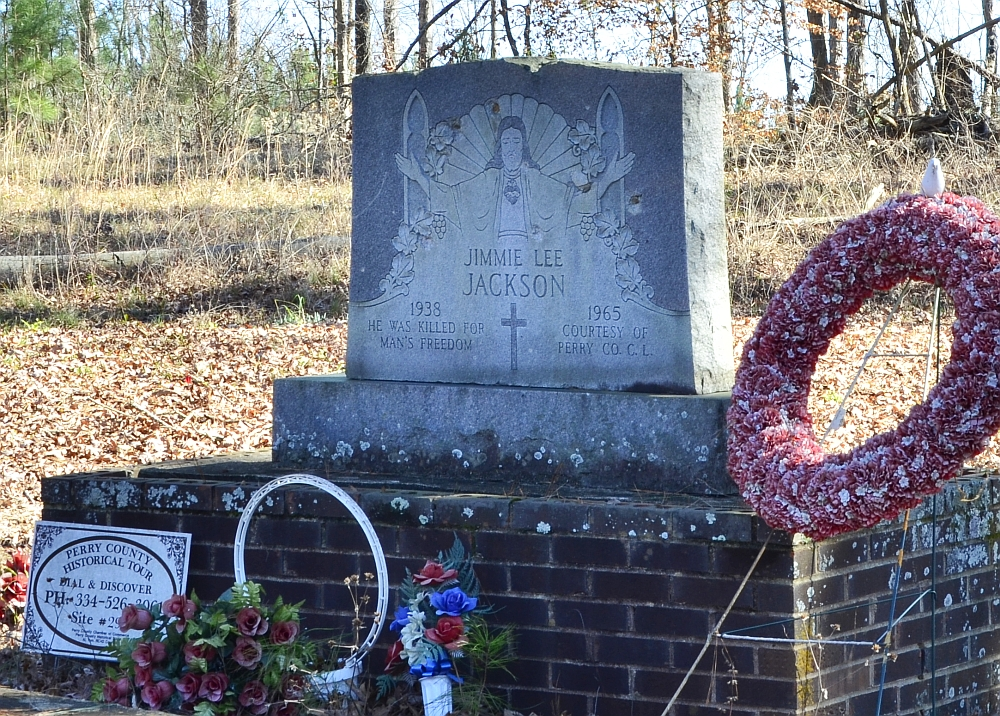
Grave of Jimmie Lee Jackson

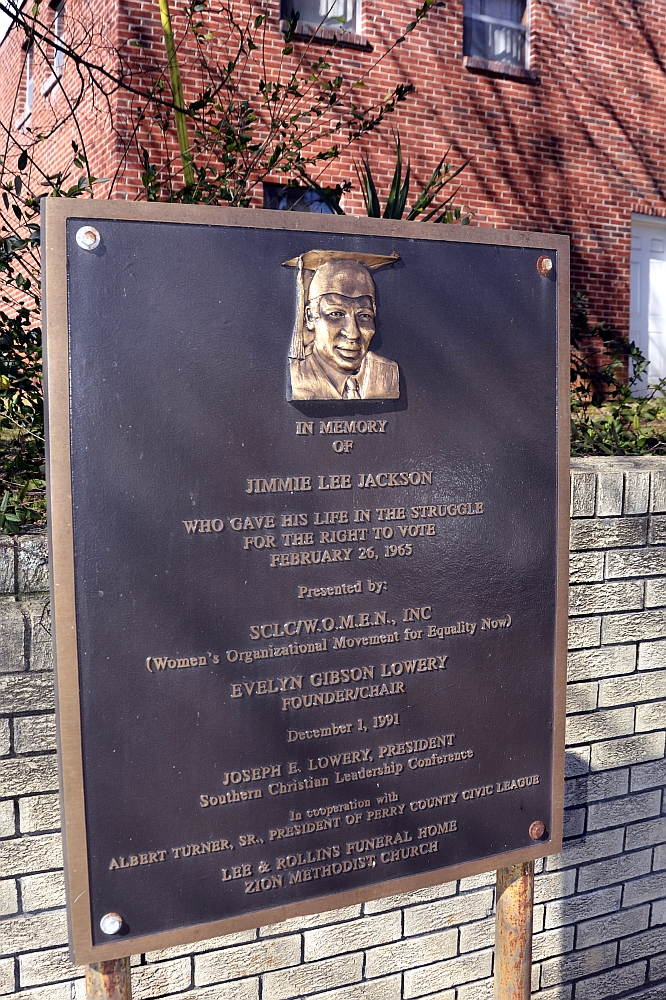
Memorial where Jackson was shot, behind Zion Methodist Church in Marion, Alabama

On the night of February 18, 1965, about 500 people who were organized by the SCLC activist C. T. Vivian left Zion United Methodist Church in Marion and attempted a peaceful walk to the Perry County jail, about a half a block away, where young civil-rights worker James Orange was being held. The marchers planned to sing hymns and return to the church. Police later said that they believed the crowd was planning a jailbreak. Among the marchers were Jackson, his 16-year-old sister, Emma Jean, mother, and maternal grandfather Cager Lee.

They were met at the post office by a line of Marion police officers, county sheriff's deputies, and Alabama state troopers. During the standoff, streetlights were abruptly turned off (some sources say they were shot out by the police), and the police began to beat the protesters. Among those beaten were two United Press International photographers, whose cameras were smashed, and NBC News correspondent Richard Valeriani, who was beaten so badly that he was hospitalized. The marchers turned and scattered back toward the church.

Jackson, his sister, his mother Viola Jackson, and his 82-year-old grandfather Cager Lee, ran into Mack's Café behind the church, pursued by state troopers. Police clubbed Lee to the floor in the kitchen; when Viola attempted to pull the police off, she was also beaten. When Jackson tried to protect his mother, one trooper threw him against a cigarette machine. A second trooper shot Jackson twice in the abdomen. It was not until 2005 that trooper James Bonard Fowler was publicly associated with the shooting. In an interview with The Anniston Star, he admitted to shooting Jackson, saying it was self-defense, as he thought Jackson was going for his gun. The wounded Jackson left the café, suffering additional blows by the police, and collapsed in front of the bus station. He was taken to the hospital.

In the presence of FBI officials at the hospital, Jackson told lawyer Oscar Adams, of Birmingham, that he was "clubbed down" by state troopers after he was shot and had escaped from the café. Before his death, Jackson was served with an arrest warrant by Col. Al Lingo, head of the Alabama State Police. The Alabama State Senate responded to national criticism and "formally denounced charges of dereliction by Lingo's Troopers in Marion."

Dr. William Dinkins first attended Jackson when he arrived at the Good Samaritan Hospital in Selma. In a 1979 interview for America, They Loved You Madly, a precursor to Eyes on the Prize, Dr. Dinkins recounts the actions he took in caring for Jackson and what he witnessed leading up to (and after) the death of Jackson eight days later on February 26, 1965. Dr. Dinkins believed that Jackson died as a result of an overdose of anesthesia after a white attending surgeon decided to conduct a second surgery. Sister Michael Anne, an administrator at the hospital, later said there were powder burns on Jackson's abdomen, indicating that he was shot at very close range.

Jackson was honored at his memorial service, eulogized as a martyr to a moral cause. He was buried in Heard Cemetery, an old slave burial ground, next to his father. His headstone was paid for by the Perry County Civic League. In the decades since, his headstone has been vandalized, bearing the marks of at least one shotgun blast.

== Aftermath ==
Two memorial services were held for Jimmie Lee Jackson. Martin Luther King Jr. spoke at one, saying,

Jimmie Lee Jackson's death says to us that we must work passionately and unrelentingly to make the American dream a reality. His death must prove that unmerited suffering does not go unredeemed. We must not be bitter and we must not harbor ideas of retaliating with violence. We must not lose faith in our white brothers.

As a result of Jackson's death and other violence, James Bevel, director of SCLC's Selma Voting Rights Movement, initiated and organized the first of the Selma to Montgomery marches. It was a way for citizens of Marion and Selma to direct their anger over Jackson's death and work for a positive outcome. It also was called to publicize the effort to gain voters' registration reform.

Held a few days later on March 7, 1965, the march became known as "Bloody Sunday" because of the violent response of state troopers and the county sheriff's posse, who attacked and beat the protesters after they walked over the Edmund Pettus Bridge, leaving the city of Selma and entering the county. The events were widely covered and attracted international attention, raising widespread support for the voting rights campaign. The federal government committed itself to protect the marchers.

In the third march to Montgomery, which began on March 21, protesters were protected by federal troops and Alabama National Guard forces under federal command. They traveled the entire way, gathering more marchers along the route. A total of 25,000 people peacefully entered the city, the largest civil rights event in the city.

In March 1965, President Lyndon B. Johnson announced his federal bill to support voting rights by authorizing federal oversight of local practices and enforcement by the federal government; it was passed by Congress as the Voting Rights Act of 1965. After the act was passed, Jimmie Lee Jackson's grandfather Cager Lee, who had marched with him in February 1965 in Marion, registered and voted for the first time at the age of 84.

In 2015 the Marion to Selma Connecting Trail was designated to connect the Selma to Montgomery National Historic Trail with the site of Jackson's death.

=== Criminal charges against James Bonard Fowler ===
A grand jury declined to indict Fowler in September 1965, identifying him only by his surname.

In 2005, Fowler admitted in an interview with John Fleming of the Anniston Star that he had shot Jackson in 1965, saying that it was in self defense. As part of an effort to prosecute civil rights-era crimes, on May 10, 2007, 42 years after the crime, the recently elected District Attorney for Perry County charged Fowler on counts of first degree and second-degree murder for Jackson's death, and he surrendered to authorities. On November 15, 2010, Fowler pleaded guilty to manslaughter and apologized publicly for killing Jackson, expressing remorse. He said he had acted in self-defense. He was sentenced to six months in jail. Arguing that the sentence was too weak, Perry County commissioner Albert Turner Jr., a civil rights leader, said the agreement was "a slap in the face of the people of this county".

Because of health problems requiring surgery, Fowler was released after serving five months.

== In popular culture ==
The 2014 drama film Selma depicts the events related to civil rights activities in the winter of 1965 in Selma and nearby jurisdictions, including Jackson's murder and the marches. Jimmie Lee Jackson was also portrayed in the 1999 film Selma, Lord, Selma which tells the story of Bloody Sunday through the eyes of 11-year-old Sheyann Webb.

== See also ==
- List of unarmed African Americans killed by law enforcement officers in the United States
