= Sheyann Webb =

Freedom Fighter

Sheyann Webb-Christburg
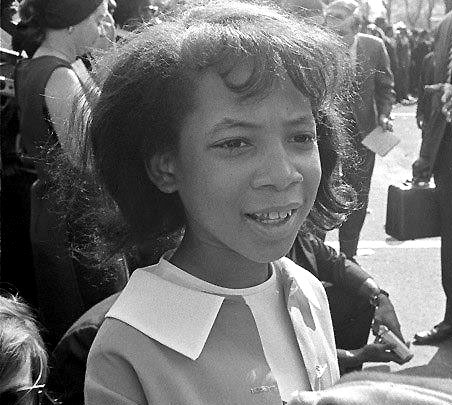
- Sheyann Webb at age 8
- Born: Selma, Alabama, U.S.
- Parent(s): John and Betty Webb

Sheyann Webb-Christburg is a civil rights activist and co-author of the book Selma, Lord, Selma. As a nine-year-old, Webb took part in the first attempt at the Selma to Montgomery march across the Edmund Pettus Bridge on March 7, 1965, known as Bloody Sunday, and was known as Martin Luther King Jr.'s "Smallest Freedom Fighter".

== The beginning of her activism ==
In January 1965, Webb met Dr. King soon after she began attending meetings. Webb states that meeting Dr King was one of the most impactful events of her life; she describes him as "a strong...patient man...one who could talk and deliver, and you could receive his message regardless of how old you were."

== Bloody Sunday ==
The march from Selma to Montgomery was organized after the death of Jimmie Lee Jackson, a member of the Southern Christian Leadership Conference (SCLC) who was beaten and shot during a peaceful march for voting rights in Marion, Alabama.

During the meeting held before Bloody Sunday, people talked about the possibilities of how the march would go, and that there was a possibility that the march wouldn't be successfully finished. Webb said that she was scared the morning of the march and that she wasn't prepared to see the things she saw, even after the warnings of the meeting the previous night.

At nine years old, marching alongside her teacher, Margaret Moore, Sheyann Webb was among the protesters who were beaten with billy clubs and gassed with tear gas. A fellow demonstrator, Hosea Williams, picked up Webb and rescued her from the violent turn of the protest. She ran home "like [she] was running for [her] life." After the first attempted march, Webb was still determined to return to Brown's Chapel Church, and she was willing to march again. She wrote her funeral arrangements the night of Bloody Sunday.

== Later activities ==
She wrote Selma, Lord, Selma, a 1980 book edited by Frank Sikora, which was adapted into a Disney television movie of the same name and found its way into secondary education textbooks.

== See also ==
- Selma to Montgomery marches
- Selma, Lord, Selma
