= James Bonard Fowler =

American police officer (1933–2015)

- Born: September 10, 1933; Geneva County, Alabama, U.S.
- Died: July 5, 2015 (aged 81); Geneva County, Alabama, U.S.
- Occupations: U.S Navy petty officer, Alabama state trooper, U.S. Army soldier, heroin trafficker, farmer
- Status: Deceased
- Convictions: Thailand; Drug trafficking Alabama; Second degree manslaughter
- Penalty: Thailand; 5 years imprisonment Alabama; 6 months imprisonment

James Bonard Fowler (September 10, 1933 – July 5, 2015) was a convicted drug trafficker and an Alabama state trooper, known for fatally shooting civil rights activist Jimmie Lee Jackson on February 18, 1965, during a peaceful march by protesters seeking voting rights. Fowler was among police and state troopers who attacked unarmed marchers that night in Marion, Alabama. A grand jury declined to indict him that year. It was not until 2005 that Fowler acknowledged shooting Jackson, a young deacon in the Baptist church, claiming to have acted in self defense. In response to Jackson's death, several days later civil rights leaders initiated the Selma to Montgomery marches as part of their campaign for voting rights. That year Congress passed the Voting Rights Act of 1965, which President Lyndon B. Johnson signed.

After the shooting, Fowler was reassigned to Birmingham. In 1968 he was dismissed from the state troopers after physically attacking his supervisor. He enlisted in the US Army, serving with valor in Vietnam. He was awarded two Silver Stars and a Purple Heart. After the war, he became a heroin trafficker in northern Thailand, returning to the US for brief visits. During his time in Thailand, he was convicted of heroin trafficking and served five years in a Thai prison. After returning to the US permanently in 1996, Fowler farmed with his wife in rural Geneva County, Alabama.

In 2005, Fowler admitted to shooting Jackson in an interview with a local newspaper, saying that he had acted in self-defense. In 2007 he was indicted by the district attorney in Perry County for Jackson's death, and in 2010 he pleaded guilty to manslaughter. He was sentenced to six months in prison but was released one month early for a surgical procedure.

Beginning in 2007, Fowler was also being investigated by the FBI for the 1966 shooting death of Nathan Johnson, a black man fatally shot after being taken to the Alabaster jail. In May 1966 he had arrested Mr. Johnson on suspicion of drunk driving. He claimed Mr. Johnson attacked him with a baton once inside the jail. Regardless, Fowler killed him.

== Early life and education ==
Fowler was born in 1933 to a farming family in Geneva County, Alabama. He attended local schools, which were racially segregated, as were other public facilities at the time. He played football in high school. After graduating, he served for a period in the US Navy from 1951 to 1953 during the Korean War as a Petty officer third class, and then attended the University of Alabama in the late 1950s. He married a local woman but later they were divorced.

== Career ==
After completing training, Fowler entered the Alabama State Police in 1961. By February 1965, he was a corporal. He and other state troopers were increasingly charged with managing or suppressing civil rights actions conducted by African-American groups seeking to regain their constitutional rights in the state and others of the South. The mid-1960s had become increasingly a time of tension in Jim Crow Alabama.

=== Shooting of Jimmie Lee Jackson ===
Leaders of the Southern Christian Leadership Conference (SCLC) and other civil rights groups had come to nearby Selma, Alabama, where they were conducting protests and marches about voting rights. On the night of February 18, 1965, around 500 people left Zion United Methodist Church in Marion, intending to walk to the City Jail about a half a block away, where a young civil rights worker was being held.

The march was to protest his arrest, and the unarmed marchers were singing hymns. They were met by a crowd of Marion City police officers, county sheriff's deputies, and Alabama State Troopers. In the standoff, streetlights were abruptly turned off (some sources say that they were shot out by the police), and the police began to beat the protestors. Two United Press International photographers were beaten by the police and their cameras were smashed.

Jimmie Lee Jackson, his mother, Viola Jackson, and his 82-year-old grandfather, Cager Lee, and some others ran into Mack's Café by the church, pursued by about ten Alabama state troopers. Police clubbed Cager Lee to the floor and his daughter Viola rushed to his aid. The 26-year-old Jackson went to help his mother and was shot twice in the abdomen by Fowler (who was not then identified). Jackson died eight days later in the hospital on February 26, 1965.

A grand jury declined to indict Fowler in September 1965, and his name was not publicized.

== Aftermath ==
Jackson's death is considered the primary catalyst for the first Selma to Montgomery march that occurred a few days later on "Bloody Sunday", March 7, 1965. The violence unleashed there increased widespread public support for the movement to gain enforcement of voting rights, and later that year the Voting Rights Act of 1965 was passed.

=== Delayed justice ===
After the shooting, Fowler returned to his duties as a State Trooper. A grand jury failed to indict him for Jackson's death. He was transferred to Birmingham, Alabama, and promoted. He said that he never received any negative reaction from supervisors about the case.

Interviewed in 2005 by John Fleming of the Anniston Star about the shooting, Fowler said:

I don't remember how many times I pulled the trigger, but I think I just pulled it once, but I might have pulled it three times. I don't remember. I didn't know his name at the time, but his name was Jimmie Lee Jackson. He weren't dead. He didn't die that night. But I heard about a month later that he died.

This was the first time he had been publicly identified as the former trooper who had shot Jackson.

On May 10, 2007, 42 years after the homicide, Fowler at the age of 73 was indicted by Michael Jackson, the district attorney for Perry County (and the second black district attorney in the state), on charges of first degree and second degree murder for the death of Jimmie Lee Jackson (no relation). Fowler subsequently surrendered to authorities. Fowler was among a number of persons who were being prosecuted in criminal cold cases from the civil rights era.

At the age of 77, Fowler pleaded guilty to one count of second degree manslaughter on November 15, 2010. Fowler apologized for the shooting but insisted that he had acted in self-defense, believing that Jackson was trying to grab his gun in the melee. Fowler was sentenced to six months in state prison. He was released early after serving five months, due to health problems that required surgery.

=== Shooting of Nathan Johnson ===
In December 2007, the Anniston Star reported new information related to the 1966 shooting death of Nathan Johnson, an African-American man, allegedly by Fowler at the Alabaster, Alabama police station. Johnson had been arrested for suspicion of drunken driving on US Highway 31 and was shot in an altercation with Fowler, then still an Alabama state trooper. The Star said these details were known to both the prosecution and defense in Fowler's 2007 case related to the shooting death of Jimmie Lee Jackson, then under prosecution.

According to details in Johnson's file, "obtained from the National Archives through the Freedom of Information Act", Johnson, an African-American man, had a "history of mental illness, and a "lengthy arrest record, including a manslaughter conviction in the death of a teenager" in a drunk driving crash. In addition, he was "intoxicated when Fowler arrested him."

In 2011, FBI officials announced that they were seeking information about the May 8, 1966, death of 34-year-old Nathan Johnson, a cold case from the civil rights era. They repeated allegations that Fowler had fatally shot him. At the time, the press had reported that law enforcement officials said Johnson had grabbed a baton from Fowler and was attacking him; the officer fatally shot Johnson twice in the chest.

=== Dismissal from State Police ===
Fowler was dismissed from the state police in 1968 for physically attacking his supervisor. His supervisor, Sergeant T. B. Barden, said Fowler was angry about a poor job evaluation and had attacked him as he was getting into his car.

Fowler and his attorney George Beck said that Fowler had taken time off to mourn with his mother after his father's death. He said that the state troopers did not give him sick leave for this absence. In the melee, he rammed Barden's head into a windshield. Barden was knocked unconscious and taken by ambulance to a Birmingham hospital. Fowler entered the US Army after being dismissed from the state troopers and served in Vietnam. His brother Robert had died there, and Fowler was able to join his former rifle unit.

In 2007 Barden said that after Fowler returned to the United States withdrawal from Vietnam, he called his former supervisor and apologized for his action. Barden said that they had a good talk and he bore no ill will toward Fowler. He had thought the man bound for a promising career before that incident.

=== US Army service and decades in Southeast Asia ===
Fowler served with the U.S. Army in Vietnam War from 1968 to 1974 as a Sergeant First Class, and was awarded the Silver Star twice, along with the Purple Heart, for his injuries in combat during his military service.

After the US pulled out of Vietnam, Fowler remained in Southeast Asia, living and working in northern Thailand. For the next two decades, Fowler returned to the United States for brief periods to take care of business in Alabama but lived primarily in Thailand. During this period he became interested in Buddhism, married Noie, a woman from Burma, and started a family in Thailand.

In the late 1980s Fowler testified in a military case involving an alleged murder-for-hire plot, in which an army sergeant wanted to kill his captain. His life took another turn a few years later, when Fowler was convicted by Thai authorities of heroin trafficking. He served about five years in a Thai prison.

== Later life ==
After returning to the United States in 1996, Fowler settled with his second wife on a farm in rural Geneva County. He farmed for the remainder of his life.

In a 2005 interview with a local newspaper, Fowler said that he greatly respected such black leaders as Nelson Mandela and Colin Powell, but generally did not think that blacks and whites should mix in society.

== Death ==
Fowler died of pancreatic cancer on July 5, 2015, in Geneva County, Alabama, at the age of 81.
