= Edmund Pettus Bridge =

Historic bridge in Selma, Alabama, United States

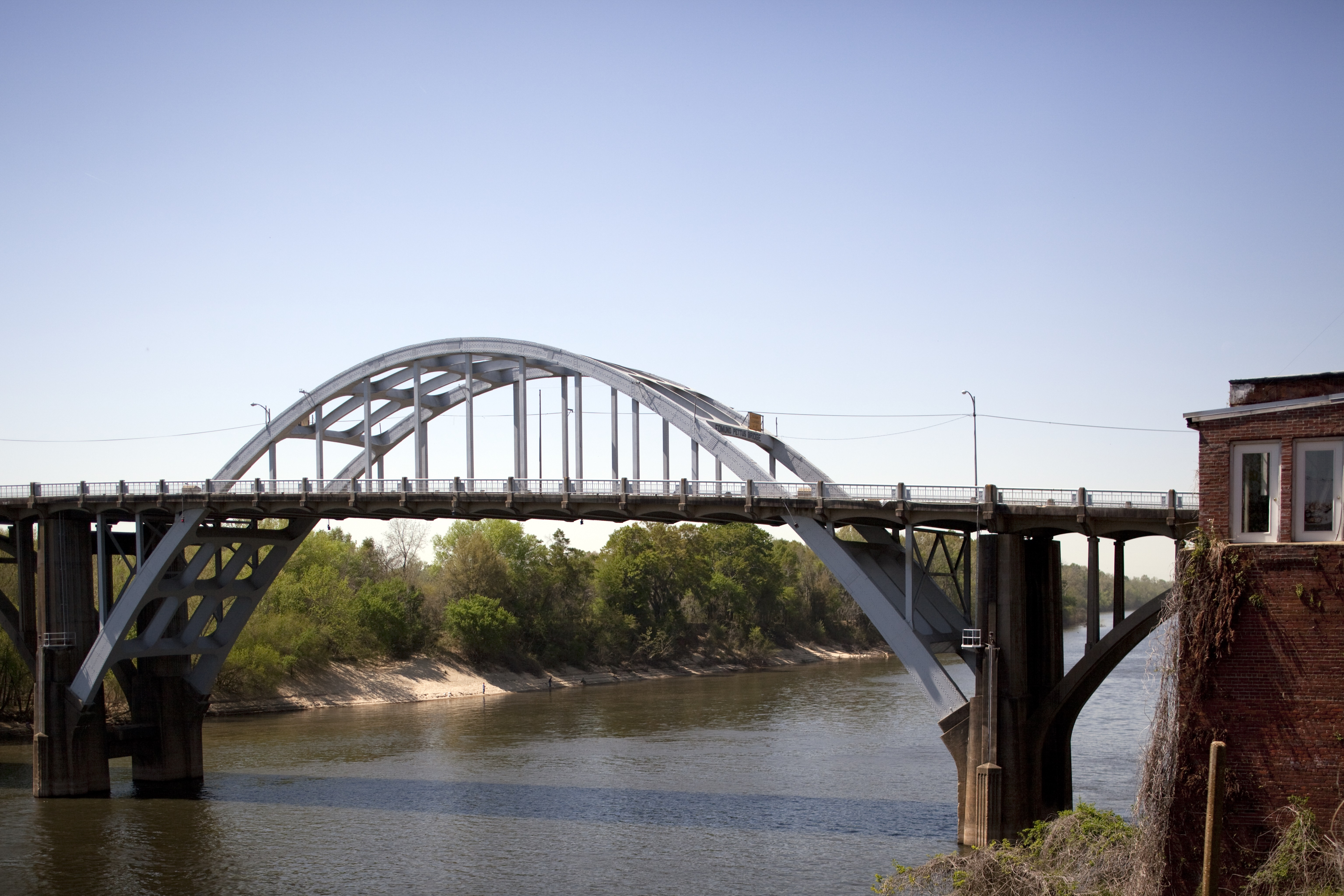
- The central span of the Edmund Pettus Bridge in April 2010
- Coordinates: 32°24′20″N 87°01′07″W
- Carries: US 80 Bus.
- Crosses: Alabama River

Characteristics
- Design: Through arch bridge
- Total length: 1,248.1 feet (380.4 m)
- Width: 42.3 feet (12.9 m)
- Longest span: 250 feet (76 m)
- No. of spans: 8
- Piers in water: 4
- Clearance above: 14.8 feet (4.5 m)

History
- Construction start: 1939
- Construction end: 1940
- Opened: May 25, 1940

Statistics
- Daily traffic: 17,720
- Edmund Pettus Bridge
- U.S. National Register of Historic Places
- U.S. National Historic Landmark
- Location: Selma, Alabama, U.S.
- Built: 1940
- Built by: T. A. Loving Company
- NRHP reference No.: 13000281

Significant dates
- Added to NRHP: February 27, 2013
- Designated NHL: February 27, 2013

Location
- Interactive map of Edmund Pettus Bridge

The Edmund Pettus Bridge carries U.S. Route 80 Business (US 80 Bus.) across the Alabama River in Selma, Alabama, United States. Built in 1940, it is named after Edmund Pettus, a former Confederate brigadier general, U.S. senator, and state-level leader ("Grand Dragon") of the Alabama Ku Klux Klan. According to Smithsonian, "The bridge was named for him, in part, to memorialize his history of restraining and imprisoning African-Americans in their quest for freedom after the Civil War". The bridge is a steel through arch bridge with a central span of 250 feet (76 m). Nine large concrete arches support the bridge and roadway on its east side.

The Edmund Pettus Bridge was the site of the conflict of Bloody Sunday on March 7, 1965, when police attacked Civil Rights Movement demonstrators with horses, billy clubs, and tear gas as they were attempting to march to the state capital, Montgomery. The marchers crossed the bridge again on March 21 and walked to the Capitol building.

The bridge was declared a National Historic Landmark on February 27, 2013.

== Design ==
The bridge carries four lanes of U.S. Route 80 Business (formerly the mainline U.S. Route 80) over the Alabama River, from Selma on the west side, to points east.

The bridge has a total of 11 spans. It has 10 smaller concrete spans, while the main span in the center, over the river, is made of steel. Because Selma is built on a bluff over the river, the west side of the bridge is higher than the east side. The center of the bridge is 100 ft (30 m) over the river.

In 2011, the bridge was listed as functionally obsolete, meaning that it does not meet current design standards for its current traffic load.

== Name ==
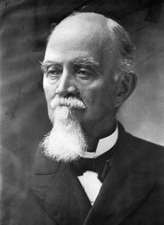
Edmund Pettus

The bridge is named after Edmund Pettus, a lawyer, judge, Confederate brigadier general, state-level leader ("Grand Dragon") of the Alabama Ku Klux Klan, and U.S. senator.

Because of Pettus' role in supporting slavery and racism in the United States, there have been efforts to rename the bridge, including one coinciding with the 50th anniversary of the Selma to Montgomery marches in 2015. Changing the name would require approval from the Alabama Legislature. One proposed alternative namesake is John Lewis, a civil rights leader who played a prominent role in the Selma to Montgomery marches and later a congressman. Support in honor of Lewis' name increased dramatically following his death in 2020, two months after the murder of George Floyd which led to protests and numerous changes to racially controversial names across the country. Lewis had voiced opposition to changing the name of the bridge before his death. Since then, Congresswoman Terri Sewell, who is U.S. representative of the area encompassing Selma and coauthored the press release in 2015 with John Lewis opposing the renaming of the bridge, has come out supporting the renaming of the bridge, saying "We must confront and reject Alabama’s racist history and come together to implement the bold changes needed to ensure our nation finally lives up to its promise of equality and justice for all."

== History ==
=== Construction ===
An earlier bridge was built in 1885 by the Milwaukee Bridge & Iron Works one block east of the current bridge to carry traffic over the river at the foot of Washington Street. It was an iron camelback truss bridge with three spans, supported on stone piers. The northernmost span swung open to allow boats to pass. It had to be operated by a bridge tender, whose house remains at the bridge site to the present day.

The Edmund Pettus Bridge was designed by Selma native Henson Stephenson and opened to traffic in 1940.

=== Civil rights flashpoint ===
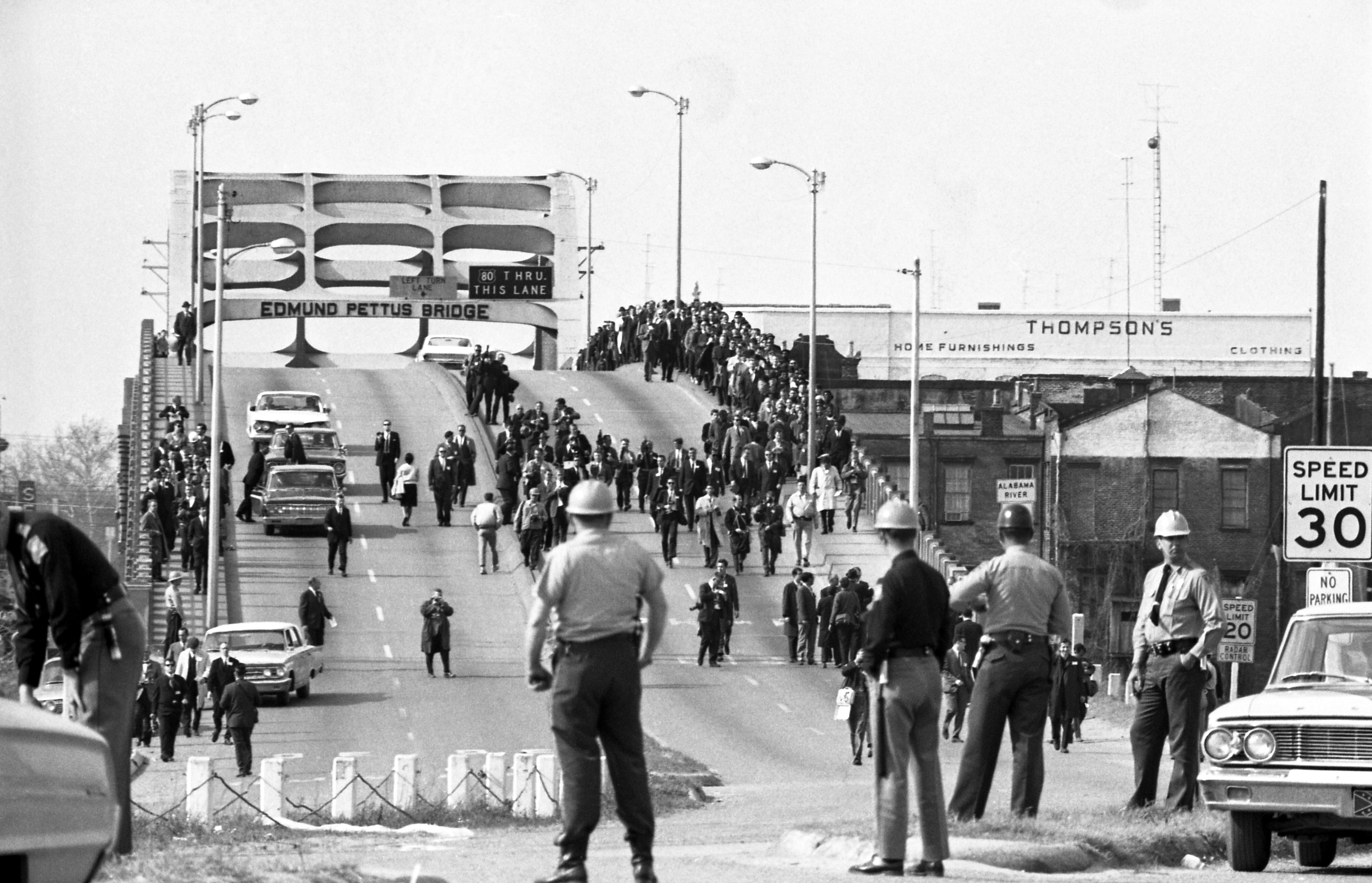
Looking north toward Selma, Alabama police prepare to confront peaceful demonstrators at the Edmund Pettus Bridge during Bloody Sunday in 1965.

In 1965, voting rights for African Americans were a contentious issue. In Selma, voting rolls were 99% White and 1% African American, while the 1960 Census found that the population of Alabama was 30% nonwhite. In February 1965, state troopers and locals in Marion, Alabama, started an armed confrontation with some 400 African-American unarmed demonstrators. Jimmie Lee Jackson was shot in the stomach, and he died eight days later. As word spread of the shooting and of Jackson's condition, the case alarmed civil rights activists, including Martin Luther King Jr. and SCLC's Director of Direct Action James Bevel. Director Bevel planned a peaceful march from Selma to the Alabama capitol building in Montgomery, which first required crossing the Pettus bridge leading out of Selma and onto the state highway.

On March 7, 1965, armed police attacked the unarmed peaceful civil rights demonstrators attempting to march to the state capital of Montgomery in an incident that became known as Bloody Sunday. Because of the design of the bridge, the protesters were unable to see the police officers on the east side of the bridge until after they had reached the top of the bridge. The protesters first saw the police while at the center of the bridge, 100 feet (30 m) above the Alabama River. Upon seeing them, protester Hosea Williams asked his fellow protester John Lewis if he knew how to swim. Despite the danger ahead, the protesters bravely continued marching. They were then attacked and brutally beaten by police and the state troopers on the other side.

Televised images of the attack presented Americans and international audiences with horrifying images of marchers left bloodied and severely injured, and roused support for the Selma Voting Rights Movement. Amelia Boynton, who had helped organize the march as well as participated in it, was beaten unconscious. A photograph of her lying on Edmund Pettus Bridge appeared on the front page of newspapers and news magazines around the world. In all, 17 marchers were hospitalized and 50 were treated for lesser injuries; the day soon became known as "Bloody Sunday" within the African-American community.

=== History since 1965 ===
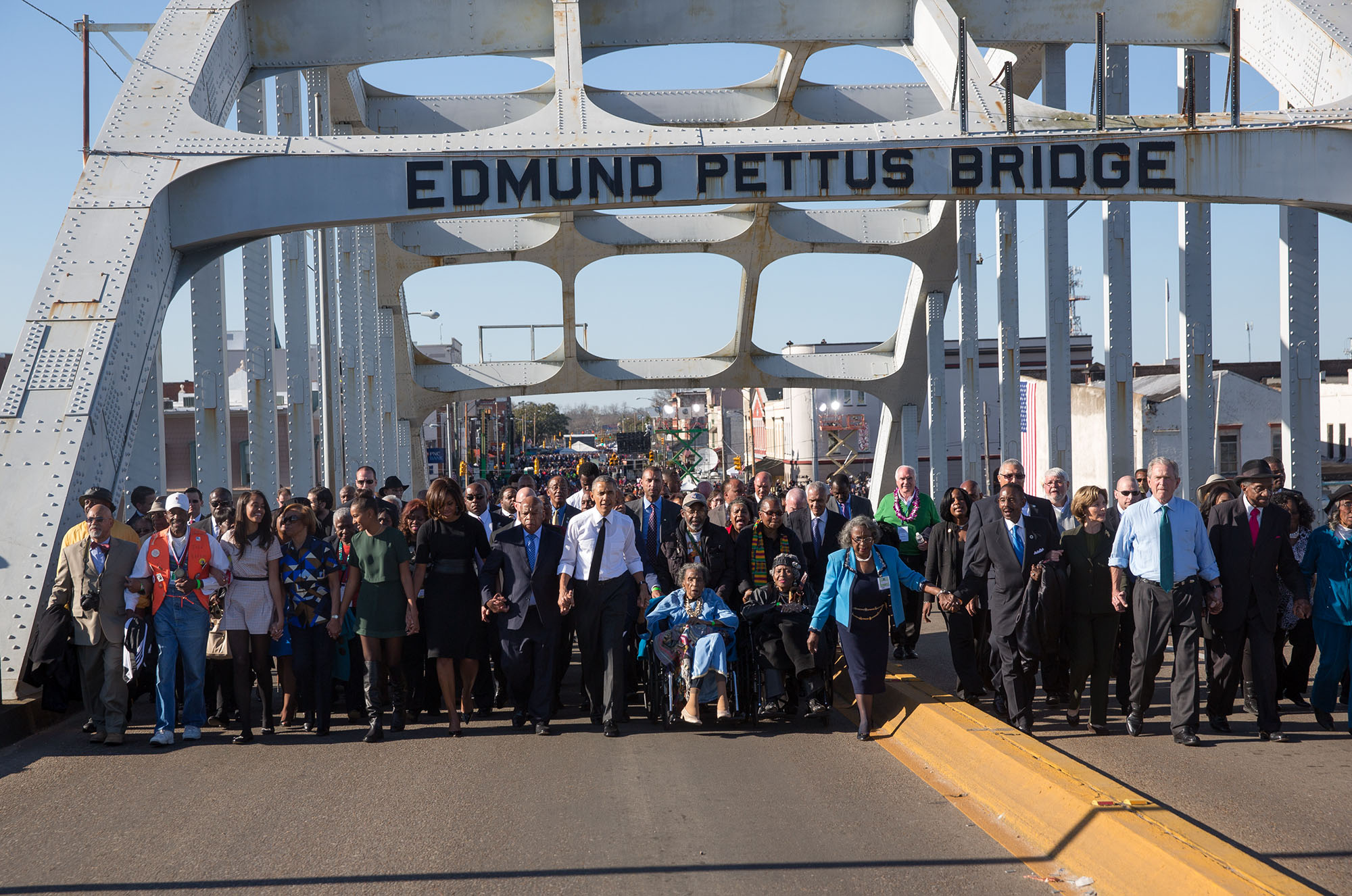
President Obama, congressman John Lewis, former President George W. Bush, and Civil Rights Movement veterans and other commemoration attendees marching across the Edmund Pettus Bridge in March 2015

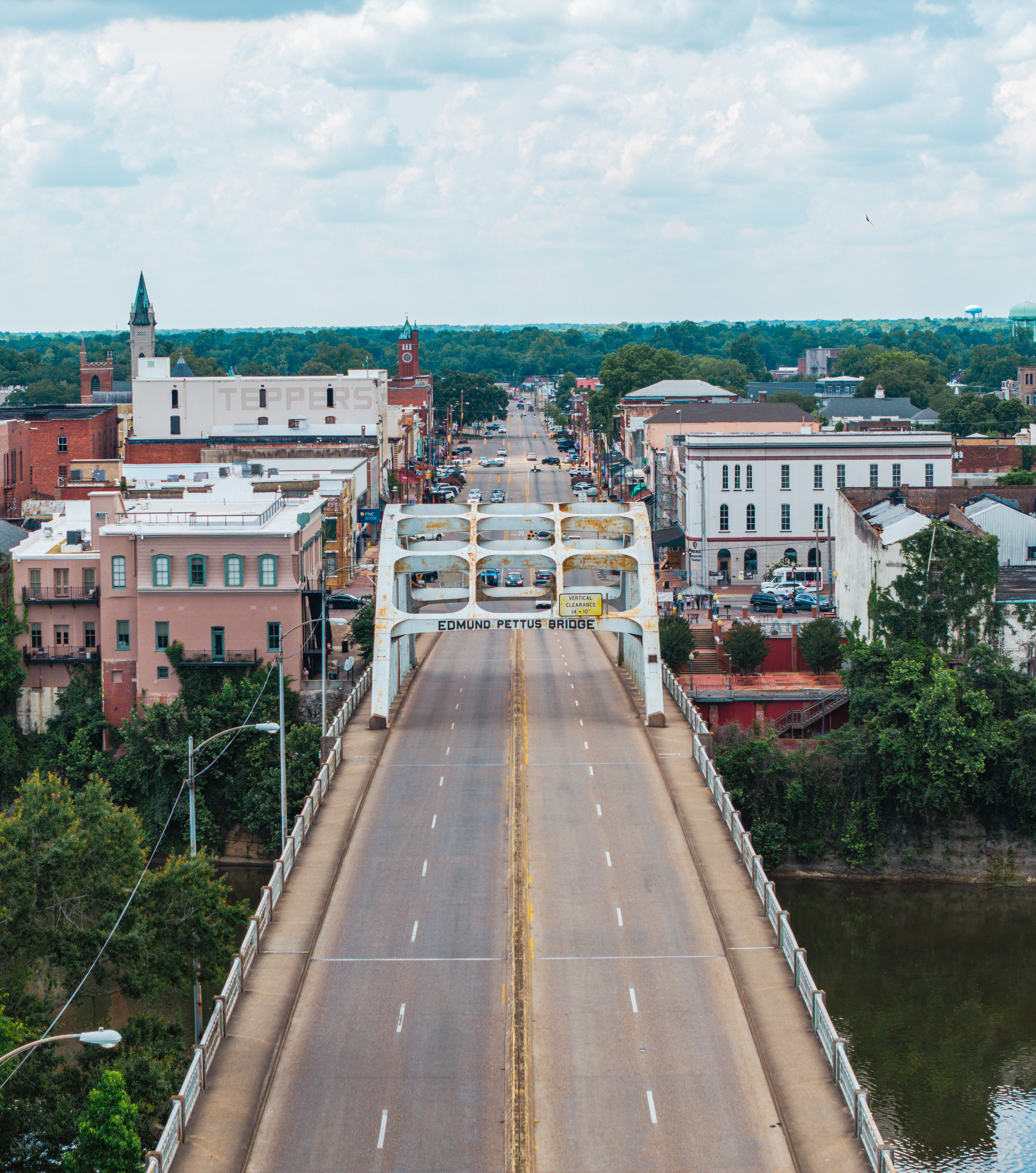
Edmund Pettus Bridge in 2026 with Selma in the background

Since 1965, many marches have commemorated the events of Bloody Sunday. On its 30th anniversary, Rep. John Lewis, former president of Student Nonviolent Coordinating Committee and a prominent activist during the Selma to Montgomery marches, said, "It's gratifying to come back and see the changes that have occurred; to see the number of registered voters and the number of Black elected officials in the state of Alabama to be able to walk with other members of Congress that are African Americans." On the 40th anniversary of Bloody Sunday, over 10,000 people, including Lewis, again marched across the Edmund Pettus Bridge.

The 1996 Summer Olympics torch relay made its way across the bridge on its way to the Summer Olympic Games in Atlanta. Andrew Young, a Bloody Sunday organizer who went on to become a U.S. Congressman, Ambassador to the United Nations, and Mayor of Atlanta, carried the Olympic flame across the bridge, accompanied by many public officials in a symbolic showing of the progress of race relations in the Southern United States. When Young spoke at the Brown Chapel A.M.E. Church as part of the torch ceremony, he said, "We couldn't have gone to Atlanta with the Olympic Games if we hadn't come through Selma a long time ago."

In March 2015, on the 50th anniversary of Bloody Sunday, U.S. president Barack Obama, the first African-American U.S. president, delivered a speech at the foot of the bridge and then, along with other U.S. political figures such as former U.S. president George W. Bush and Representative John Lewis, and Civil Rights Movement activists such as Amelia Boynton Robinson (at Obama's side in a wheelchair), led a march across the bridge. An estimated 40,000 people attended to commemorate the 1965 march, and to reflect on and speak about its impact on history and continuing efforts to address and improve U.S. civil rights.

External videos
- Edmund Pettus Bridge Processional in Honor of Rep. John Lewis, July 26, 2020, C-SPAN

=== Renaming suggestion ===
After civil rights leader and U.S. Congressman John Lewis died in July 2020, calls rose to rename the bridge after him, though Lewis—in an editorial with Representative Terri Sewell—had previously voiced opposition to renaming the bridge, stating: "Keeping the name of the Bridge is not an endorsement of the man who bears its name but rather an acknowledgement that the name of the Bridge today is synonymous with the Voting Rights Movement which changed the face of this nation and the world." Part of the funeral procession for Lewis included transporting his casket across the bridge in a caisson en route to Montgomery, where he lay in repose at the Alabama State Capitol.

== In popular culture ==
- In Eyes on the Prize, the award-winning documentary on the Civil Rights movement, the 1965 events on the bridge are the focus of Episode 6, "Bridge to Freedom."
- Marilyn Miller's 1989 book, The Bridge at Selma (Turning Points in American History), describes the repercussions of the events of March 7, 1965, on Edmund Pettus Bridge.
- In the March trilogy (2013–2016), the graphic novel autobiography of John Lewis, Lewis and Martin Luther King's trepidation at the crossing of the bridge, and the ensuing confrontation with state troopers, bookend the story as a framing sequence seen in the beginning of Book One and near the end of Book Three.
- "Dear Hate", a collaboration by country singers Maren Morris and Vince Gill, features the lyrics: "Dear Hate, you were smiling from that Selma bridge".
- Andrea Davis Pinkney's 2022 book, Because of You, John Lewis: The True Story of a Remarkable Friendship, describes the story of the friendship between Congressman John Lewis and ten-year-old activist Tybre Faw when he learns of Lewis' march across the bridge.
- The 2014 film Selma is centered around the events leading up to the march and the march itself.

== See also ==
- List of bridges documented by the Historic American Engineering Record in Alabama
