= Boynton v. Virginia =

- Supreme Court of the United States

Argued October 12, 1960 Decided December 5, 1960
- Full case name: Boynton v. Virginia
- Citations: 364 U.S. 454 (more) 81 S. Ct. 182; 5 L. Ed. 2d 206; 1960 U.S. LEXIS 1889

Case history
- Prior: Cert. granted, 361 U.S. 958 (1960).

Holding
- Racial segregation in public transportation is illegal under the Interstate Commerce Act of 1887.

Court membership
- Chief Justice Earl Warren Associate Justices Hugo Black · Felix Frankfurter; William O. Douglas · Tom C. Clark; John M. Harlan II · William J. Brennan Jr. Charles E. Whittaker · Potter Stewart

Case opinions
- Majority: Black, joined by Warren, Frankfurter, Douglas, Harlan, Brennan, Stewart
- Dissent: Whittaker, joined by Clark

Laws applied
- Interstate Commerce Act of 1887

Boynton v. Virginia, 364 U.S. 454 (1960), is a landmark decision of the US Supreme Court. The case overturned a judgment convicting an African American law student for trespassing by being in a restaurant in a bus terminal which was "whites only". It held that racial segregation in public transportation was illegal because such segregation violated the Interstate Commerce Act, which broadly forbade discrimination in interstate passenger transportation. It moreover held that bus transportation was sufficiently related to interstate commerce to allow the United States federal government to regulate it to forbid racial discrimination in the industry.

Thurgood Marshall argued the case for Boynton. The majority opinion was written by Justice Hugo Black.

The significance of Boynton was not located in its holding since it managed to avoid deciding any Constitutional questions in its decision, and its expansive reading of Federal powers regarding interstate commerce was also well established by the time of the decision. Its significance is that its outlawing of racial segregation in public transportation led directly to a movement called the Freedom Rides, in which African Americans and whites together rode various forms of public transportation in the South to challenge local laws or customs that enforced segregation. The Freedom Rides, and the violent reactions they provoked, prompted Attorney General Robert F. Kennedy to confront the Interstate Commerce Commission (ICC) with its failure to enforce a bus desegregation ruling it had handed down in 1955, Sarah Keys v. Carolina Coach Company, 64 MCC 769 (1955) as well as the companion train desegregation case, NAACP v. St. Louis-Santa Fe Railway Company, 297 ICC 335 (1955). By presenting the commission with its own rulings in a May 29, 1961, petition, Kennedy was able to prompt it to do what it had promised in 1955, five years before the Boynton ruling was handed down, and six years before the Freedom Riders set out to test Boynton across the Deep South. On September 22, 1961, the ICC issued regulations which implemented its 1955 Keys and NAACP rulings, as well as the Supreme Court's ruling in Boynton, and on November 1 those regulations went into effect, effectively ending Jim Crow in public transportation.

== Boynton's trip and arrest ==
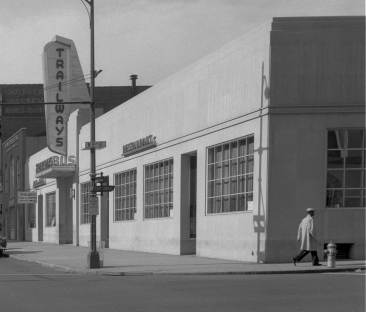
Bruce Boynton was arrested at the Trailways Station in Richmond, Virginia, in late 1958 (Library of Virginia photo, 1960)

In the winter of 1958, Bruce Boynton was a student at Howard University School of Law in Washington, D.C. While travelling on a Trailways bus for a holiday trip to his home in Selma, Alabama, his bus arrived at the Trailways station on East Broad Street in Richmond, Virginia. Passengers disembarked for a 40-minute layover. Unlike other black passengers, Boynton went into a "whites only" restaurant, where he ordered a cheeseburger and a cup of hot tea. He never had problems in Northern states, but he grew up in Selma and was familiar with segregation of restaurants and movie theaters. It was not his intent to test any laws in the South that night.

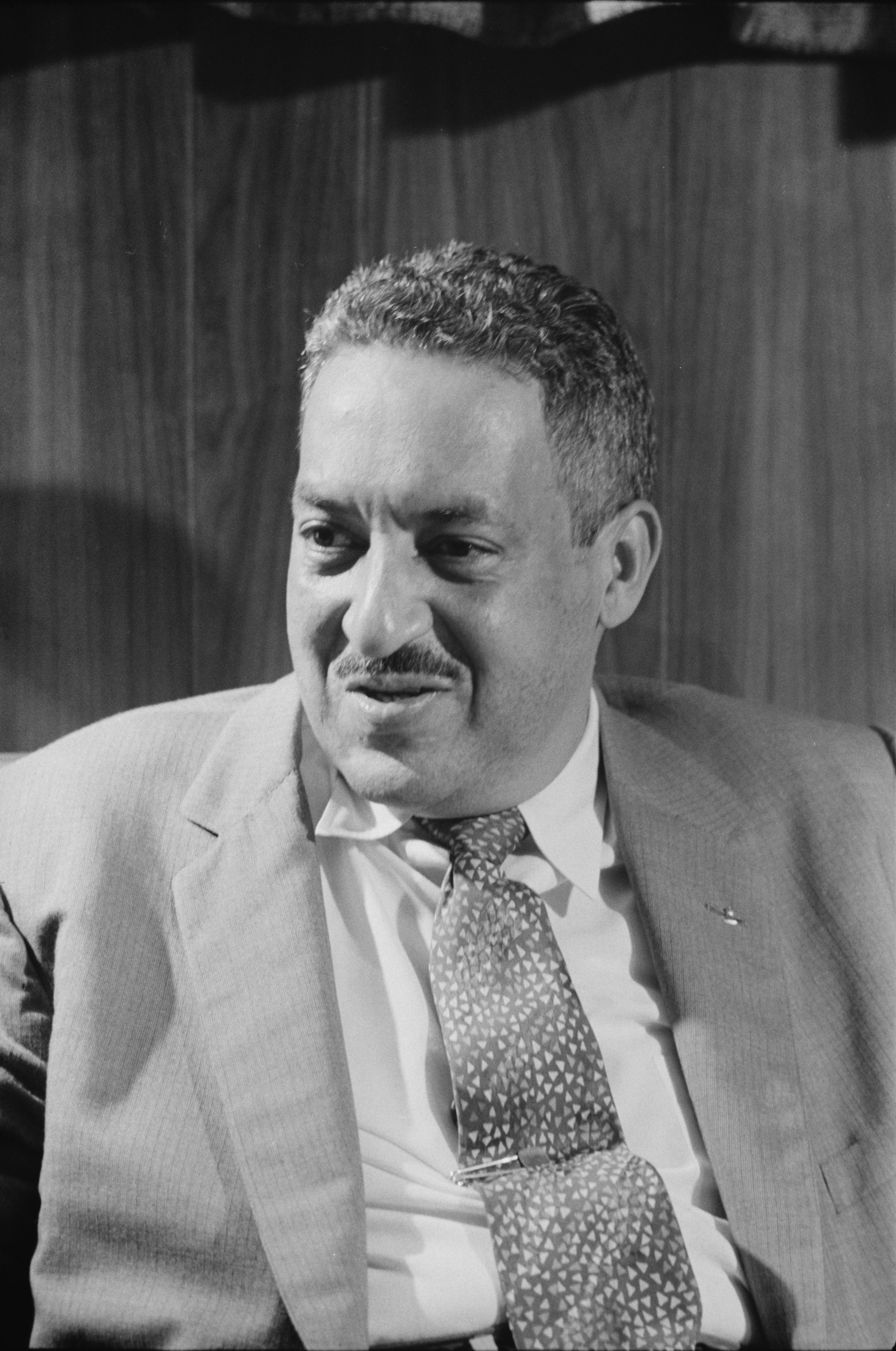
Future justice Thurgood Marshall argued the case for Boynton in front of the U.S. Supreme Court (1957 photo)

Ordered to move to the "black" section and knowing that his arrest was likely, Boynton pointed out to authorities that he was an American citizen with federal rights and, thus, was entitled to his burger and tea. Handcuffed and arrested on a misdemeanor trespass charge, he spent the night in jail and was fined $10 in a Richmond municipal court. Bruce Boynton just wanted a cheese burger but he ended up empowering the Civil Rights movement and Black people around the United States. His hunger forever changed the course of history.

== Boynton in the Virginia courts ==
In the Richmond Police Court, Boynton was convicted of violating a state statute making it a misdemeanor for any person "without authority of law" to remain upon the premises of another after having been forbidden to do so. His conviction was sustained in Richmond's Hustings Court.

On appeal, he contended that his conviction violated the Interstate Commerce Act and the Equal Protection, Due Process and Commerce Clauses of the Federal Constitution; but his conviction was sustained by the Supreme Court of Virginia.

== Boynton's Federal appeal ==
Future U.S. Supreme Court Justice Thurgood Marshall argued Boynton's case on appeal in the Federal Courts. On petition for certiorari to the Supreme Court, he raised only the constitutional questions.

== Supreme Court Ruling ==
Syllabus

Held:

1. Notwithstanding the fact that the petition for certiorari presented only the constitutional questions this Court will consider the statutory issue, which involves essentially the same problem—racial discrimination in interstate commerce. P. 457.
2. Under § 216(d) of the Interstate Commerce Act, which forbids any interstate common carrier by motor vehicle to subject any person to unjust discrimination, petitioner had a federal right to remain in the white portion of the restaurant, he was there "under authority of law", and it was error to affirm his conviction. Pp. 457–463.

(a) When a bus carrier has volunteered to make terminal and restaurant facilities and services available to its interstate passengers as a regular part of their transportation, and the terminal and restaurant have acquiesced and cooperated in this undertaking, the terminal and restaurant must perform these services without discriminations prohibited by the Act. Pp. 457–461.
(b) Although the courts below made no findings of fact, the evidence in this case shows such a situation here. Pp. 461–463.

Reversed.

== See also ==
- List of United States Supreme Court cases, volume 364
