= List of accolades received by Selma =

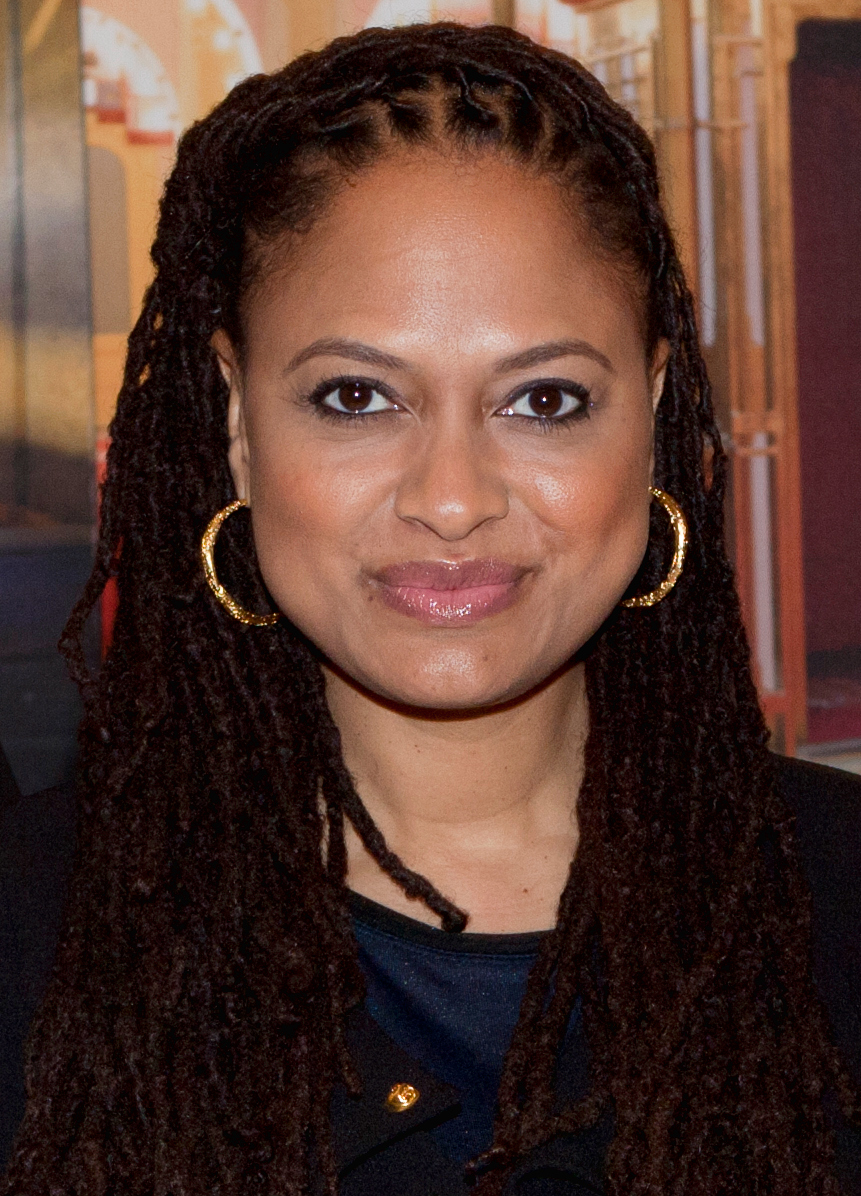
- Ava DuVernay received many awards and nominations for directing the film.
Accolades
Award	Won	Nominated
Academy Awards	1	2
African-American Film Critics Association	4	4
Alliance of Women Film Journalists	1	3
American Film Institute	1	1
BET Awards	2	2
Black Reel Awards	8	10
Casting Society of America	0	1
Costume Designers Guild	0	1
Critics' Choice Movie Awards	1	5
Dallas–Fort Worth Film Critics Association	1	2
Dorian Awards	1	1
Golden Globe Awards	1	4
Grammy Awards	1	2
Hamptons International Film Festival	1	1
Houston Film Critics Society	0	2
Independent Spirit Awards	0	5
Los Angeles Film Critics Association	1	1
Motion Picture Sound Editors	0	1
MTV Movie Awards	0	2
NAACP Image Award	4	8
National Board of Review	1	1
New York Film Critics Online	1	1
Online Film Critics Society	0	3
Palm Springs International Film Festival	3	3
San Diego Film Critics Society	0	2
Santa Barbara International Film Festival	1	1
Satellite Awards	0	4
St. Louis Gateway Film Critics Association	0	1
Washington D.C. Area Film Critics Association	0	5
Women Film Critics Circle	2	2
- Total number of awards and nominations
Totals	36	81
- References

Selma is a 2014 historical drama film directed by Ava DuVernay, and produced by Dede Gardner, Jeremy Kleiner, Christian Colson, and Oprah Winfrey. The screenplay was written by Paul Webb. The film follows the events leading up to and during the Selma to Montgomery marches, and the resulting establishment of the Voting Rights Act of 1965 which prohibited racial discrimination in voting in the United States. The film stars David Oyelowo as civil rights activist Martin Luther King Jr., Tom Wilkinson as President Lyndon B. Johnson, and Tim Roth as Governor of Alabama George Wallace. Carmen Ejogo, Dylan Baker, Wendell Pierce, Common, and Winfrey feature in supporting roles.

Selma premiered at the AFI Fest on November 11, 2014, in Los Angeles. Paramount Pictures initially provided the film a limited release on December 25 before a wide release at over 2,100 theaters on January 9, 2015. Selma grossed a worldwide total of over $66 million on a production budget of $20 million. Rotten Tomatoes, a review aggregator, surveyed 301 reviews and judged 99 percent to be positive. The film garnered awards and nominations in a variety of categories with particular praise for its direction, Oyelowo's portrayal of King, and the song "Glory" by John Legend, and Common. At the 87th Academy Awards, Selma won for Best Original Song for "Glory" and also received a nomination for Best Picture—the first film directed by a black female director to achieve this feat. The film received four nominations at the 72nd Golden Globe Awards, winning the Best Original Song award for "Glory". DuVernay's nomination for Best Director was the first for a black female director.

The film received the most awards at the 46th NAACP Image Awards, winning for Outstanding Actor in a Motion Picture for Oyelowo, Outstanding Supporting Actor in a Motion Picture for Common, and Outstanding Supporting Actress in a Motion Picture for Ejogo. At the 2015 Black Reel Awards, Selma joint-led the nominations with Dear White People, both films receiving ten nominations. It went on to win eight including Outstanding Film, Outstanding Actor – Feature for Oyelowo, and Outstanding Director – Feature for DuVernay. The American Film Institute included Selma in their list of top ten films of the year.

== Accolades ==
Award	Date of ceremony	Category	Recipients	Result	Ref.
Academy Awards	February 22, 2015	Best Picture	Dede Gardner, Jeremy Kleiner, Christian Colson, and Oprah Winfrey	Nominated	
Academy Awards	February 22, 2015	Best Original Song	John Legend and Common for "Glory"	Won	
African-American Film Critics Association	December 8, 2014	Top Ten Films of 2014	Selma	1st Place	
African-American Film Critics Association	December 8, 2014	Best Director	Ava DuVernay	Won	
African-American Film Critics Association	December 8, 2014	Best Actor	David Oyelowo	Won	
African-American Film Critics Association	December 8, 2014	Best Music	John Legend and Common for "Glory"	Won	
Alliance of Women Film Journalists	January 12, 2015	Best Film	Selma	Nominated	
Alliance of Women Film Journalists	January 12, 2015	Best Director	Ava DuVernay	Nominated	
Alliance of Women Film Journalists	January 12, 2015	Best Woman Director	Ava DuVernay	Won	
American Film Institute	December 9, 2014	Top Ten Movies of the Year	Selma	Won	
BET Awards	June 28, 2015	Best Collaboration	John Legend and Common for "Glory"	Won	
BET Awards	June 28, 2015	Best Movie	Selma	Won	
Black Reel Awards	February 19, 2015	Outstanding Film	Selma	Won	
Black Reel Awards	February 19, 2015	Outstanding Actor – Feature	David Oyelowo	Won	
Black Reel Awards	February 19, 2015	Outstanding Supporting Actor – Feature	Wendell Pierce	Won	
Black Reel Awards	February 19, 2015	Outstanding Supporting Actress – Feature	Carmen Ejogo	Won	
Black Reel Awards	February 19, 2015	Outstanding Director – Feature	Ava DuVernay	Won	
Black Reel Awards	February 19, 2015	Outstanding Ensemble – Feature	Aisha Coley	Won	
Black Reel Awards	February 19, 2015	Outstanding Breakthrough Performance, Male – Feature	Andre Holland	Nominated	
Black Reel Awards	February 19, 2015	Outstanding Breakthrough Performance, Male – Feature	Stephan James	Nominated	
Black Reel Awards	February 19, 2015	Outstanding Score – Feature	Jason Moran	Won	
Black Reel Awards	February 19, 2015	Outstanding Original Song – Feature	John Legend and Common for "Glory"	Won	
Casting Society of America	January 22, 2015	Big Budget Drama	Aisha Coley and Robyn Owen	Nominated	
Costume Designers Guild	February 17, 2015	Excellence in Period Film	Ruth E. Carter	Nominated	
Critics' Choice Movie Awards	January 15, 2015	Best Picture	Selma	Nominated	
Critics' Choice Movie Awards	January 15, 2015	Best Director	Ava DuVernay	Nominated	
Critics' Choice Movie Awards	January 15, 2015	Best Actor	David Oyelowo	Nominated	
Critics' Choice Movie Awards	January 15, 2015	Best Acting Ensemble	Selma	Nominated	
Critics' Choice Movie Awards	January 15, 2015	Best Song	John Legend and Common for "Glory"	Won	
Dallas–Fort Worth Film Critics Association	December 15, 2014	Top Ten Films of the Year	Selma	Won	
Dallas–Fort Worth Film Critics Association	December 15, 2014	Best Director	Ava DuVernay	5th Place	
Dorian Awards	January 20, 2015	Film Director of the Year	Ava DuVernay	Won	
Golden Globe Awards	January 11, 2015	Best Actor in a Drama Motion Picture	David Oyelowo	Nominated	
Golden Globe Awards	January 11, 2015	Best Director	Ava DuVernay	Nominated	
Golden Globe Awards	January 11, 2015	Best Drama Motion Picture	Dede Gardner, Jeremy Kleiner, Christian Colson, and Oprah Winfrey	Nominated	
Golden Globe Awards	January 11, 2015	Best Original Song	John Legend and Common for "Glory"	Won	
Grammy Awards	February 18, 2016	Best Compilation Soundtrack for Visual Media	Selma	Nominated	
Grammy Awards	February 18, 2016	Best Song Written for Visual Media	John Legend and Common for "Glory"	Won	
Hamptons International Film Festival	October 10, 2015	Variety's 10 Actors to Watch	Tessa Thompson	Won	
Houston Film Critics Society	January 12, 2015	Best Picture	Selma	Nominated	
Houston Film Critics Society	January 12, 2015	Best Original Song	John Legend and Common for "Glory"	Nominated	
Independent Spirit Awards	February 21, 2015	Best Film	Dede Gardner, Jeremy Kleiner, Christian Colson, and Oprah Winfrey	Nominated	
Independent Spirit Awards	February 21, 2015	Best Director	Ava DuVernay	Nominated	
Independent Spirit Awards	February 21, 2015	Best Actor	David Oyelowo	Nominated	
Independent Spirit Awards	February 21, 2015	Best Supporting Actress	Carmen Ejogo	Nominated	
Independent Spirit Awards	February 21, 2015	Best Cinematography	Bradford Young	Nominated	
Los Angeles Film Critics Association	December 7, 2014	New Generation Award	Ava DuVernay	Won	
Motion Picture Sound Editors	February 15, 2015	Feature Music	Julie Pearce and Clint Bennett	Nominated	
MTV Movie Awards	April 12, 2015	Movie of the Year	Selma	Nominated	
MTV Movie Awards	April 12, 2015	Breakthrough Performance	David Oyelowo	Nominated	
NAACP Image Award	February 6, 2015	Outstanding Actor in a Motion Picture	David Oyelowo	Won	
NAACP Image Award	February 6, 2015	Outstanding Directing in a Motion Picture	Ava DuVernay	Nominated	
NAACP Image Award	February 6, 2015	Outstanding Motion Picture	Selma	Won	
NAACP Image Award	February 6, 2015	Outstanding Supporting Actor in a Motion Picture	Andre Holland	Nominated	
NAACP Image Award	February 6, 2015	Outstanding Supporting Actor in a Motion Picture	Common	Won	
NAACP Image Award	February 6, 2015	Outstanding Supporting Actor in a Motion Picture	Wendell Pierce	Nominated	
NAACP Image Award	February 6, 2015	Outstanding Supporting Actress in a Motion Picture	Carmen Ejogo	Won	
NAACP Image Award	February 6, 2015	Outstanding Supporting Actress in a Motion Picture	Oprah Winfrey	Nominated	
National Board of Review	December 2, 2014	Freedom of Expression Award	Selma	Won	
New York Film Critics Online	December 7, 2014	Top Ten Pictures	Selma	Won	
Online Film Critics Society	December 15, 2014	Best Picture	Selma	Nominated	
Online Film Critics Society	December 15, 2014	Best Director	Ava DuVernay	Nominated	
Online Film Critics Society	December 15, 2014	Best Original Screenplay	Paul Webb	Nominated	
Palm Springs International Film Festival	January 3, 2015	Best Narrative Feature	Selma	Won	
Palm Springs International Film Festival	January 3, 2015	Breakthrough Performance Award	David Oyelowo	Won	
Palm Springs International Film Festival	January 3, 2015	Variety's 10 Directors to Watch	Ava DuVernay	Won	
San Diego Film Critics Society	December 15, 2014	Best Film	Selma	Nominated	
San Diego Film Critics Society	December 15, 2014	Best Ensemble	Selma	Nominated	
Santa Barbara International Film Festival	February 1, 2015	Virtuosos Award	David Oyelowo	Won	
Satellite Awards	February 15, 2015	Best Film	Selma	Nominated	
Satellite Awards	February 15, 2015	Best Director	Ava DuVernay	Nominated	
Satellite Awards	February 15, 2015	Best Actor – Motion Picture	David Oyelowo	Nominated	
Satellite Awards	February 15, 2015	Best Screenplay – Original	Paul Webb	Nominated	
St. Louis Gateway Film Critics Association	December 15, 2014	Best Scene	"Church Bombing"	Nominated	
Washington D.C. Area Film Critics Association	December 8, 2014	Best Film	Selma	Nominated	
Washington D.C. Area Film Critics Association	December 8, 2014	Best Director	Ava DuVernay	Nominated	
Washington D.C. Area Film Critics Association	December 8, 2014	Best Actor	David Oyelowo	Nominated	
Washington D.C. Area Film Critics Association	December 8, 2014	Best Ensemble	Selma	Nominated	
Washington D.C. Area Film Critics Association	December 8, 2014	The Joe Barber Award for Best Portrayal of Washington, DC	Selma	Nominated	
Women Film Critics Circle	December 16, 2014	Best Movie by a Woman	Selma	Won	
Women Film Critics Circle	December 16, 2014	Best Female Action Star	Oprah Winfrey	Won	

== See also ==
- 2014 in film
