= John Lavelle (actor) =

American actor (born 1981)

- Born: November 23, 1981 (age 44); Brooklyn, New York, U.S.
- Occupations: Actor, playwright
- Years active: 2003–present

John Lavelle (born November 23, 1981) is an American stage, film, television actor, and playwright who is perhaps best known for his role as Benjamin Braddock in John Reid's 2002 Broadway adaptation of The Graduate, where he starred opposite Lorraine Bracco, and for his portrayal of Roy Reed in the film Selma. He is the author of several plays including Sinner's Laundry and Inhalation. He won a Drama Desk Award for his work in The Royale at the Lincoln Center Theatre.

== Early life ==
A Brooklyn native, Lavelle grew up in Great Kills, Staten Island and graduated from Monsignor Farrell High School in Oakwood, Staten Island. At Monsignor Farrell, he also became the first anchor of their student-run television station, WFBN. After high school Lavelle attended the Tisch School of the Arts at New York University, graduating in 2004 with a Bachelor of Fine Arts in Drama. He is a performer at the Upright Citizen's Brigade and a member of IAMA Theatre Company in Los Angeles.

== Filmography ==
=== Film ===
Year	Title	Role	Notes
2003	Frozen Impact	Michael	TV film
2003	Sixteen to Life	Kyle Braddock	TV film
2004	Innuendo	Police Detective	Short film
2007	The Sandpiper	Ethan Lang	
2008	August	Suit #1 (Brad)	
2009	Can Openers	Tom	TV film
2009	The Taking of Pelham 123	Team Member (NYPD)	
2010	Porcelain and Diamonds	Jimmy Waldricki	Short film
2010	12	The Intern	Video short
2011	Dirty Movie	The Writer	
2011	Good News, Oklahoma!	River	Short film
2012	Broadway's Finest	Goldstone	
2013	Frozen	Additional Voices	
2013	Some Other Time	Hocky	
2014	LA Bound: 7 Things Nobody Tells You About Moving to LA	Passenger Guy	Short film
2014	Selma	Roy Reed	
2016	Zootopia	Mouse Foreman (voice)	
2017	Born Guilty	Grant	
2017	In the Bubble	Hipster/Redneck #1	Video short
2017	Pretty Paper	John	Short film
2018	Ralph Breaks the Internet	Additional Voices	
2020	Where There's Smoke	Bruce	Short film

=== Television ===
Year	Title	Role	Notes
2004	Guiding Light	Luke Huff	1 episode
2004	All My Children	Seth Phelps	3 episodes
2005	Law & Order: Trial by Jury	Mark Arnett	Episode: "Blue Wall" (uncredited)
2007	The Black Donnellys	Eddie Maxwell	Episode: "Run Like Hell"
2009	Numb3rs	Gill Harkness	Episode: "Con Job"
2011	NCIS	Derrick Archer	Episode: "Tell-All"
2012	LA'd	John	Episode: "Mouseketeer"
2011–2012	Cracked Advice Board	Rick	2 episodes
2013	Modern Music	Xavier Chase	2 episodes
2015	Forever	Anthony Hanson	Episode: "Hitler on the Half-Shell"
2016	Heirloom	Roger	6 episodes
2017	Grace and Frankie	Highsmith	Episode: "The Incubator"
2018	The Dead Girls Detective Agency	Brett	4 episodes
2020	She-Ra and the Princesses of Power	Peekablue (voice)	Episode: "Perils of Peekablue"
2020	Kipo and the Age of Wonderbeasts	Puck / Liam / Janitor Bob (voices)	8 episodes
2022	Zootopia+	Yax / Gerald Cook / Additional Voices	6 episodes
2024	Megamind Rules!	PAL-3000 (voice)	Episode: "Extra Credit"

=== Video games ===
Year	Title	Role	Notes
2006	Bully	Derby Harrington	One of the antagonists of the game; voice only
