= Weekend Warriors (upcoming film) =

American sports comedy drama film

- Directed by: Stephen Chbosky
- Screenplay by: Stephen Chbosky
- Based on: Weekend Rebels by: Marc Rothemund; Wir Wochenendrebellen; Mirco Juterczenka and Jason von Juterczenka
- Produced by: Dede Gardner; Jeremy Kleiner; Spencer Beighley; LeBron James; Jamal Henderson
- Starring: Mark Wahlberg; Vera Farmiga; Wood Harris; Didi Conn
- Production companies: Plan B Entertainment; SpringHill Company; Apple Studios
- Distributed by: Apple TV
- Country: United States
- Language: English

Weekend Warriors is an upcoming American sports comedy-drama film written and directed by Stephen Chbosky, starring Mark Wahlberg, Vera Farmiga, Wood Harris, and Didi Conn.

== Cast ==
- Mark Wahlberg
- Vera Farmiga
- Indie DesRoches
- Wood Harris
- Mark Linn-Baker
- Yakov Smirnoff
- Didi Conn

== Production ==
The film is produced by Plan B Entertainment and SpringHill Company and written and directed by Stephen Chbosky. It is based on the 2023 film Weekend Rebels, a German-language sports comedy-drama based on the true story of Mirco and Jason von Juterczenka but with the sport transposed to basketball from soccer. Mark Wahlberg was attached to the lead role in August 2024. The film is produced by Dede Gardner and Jeremy Kleiner for Plan B, and Spencer Beighley, LeBron James and Jamal Henderson for SpringHill.

Principal photography began on September 2, 2025, in Los Angeles, Colorado, and Louisiana, and wrapped on November 5. Indie DesRoches, Wood Harris, Mark Linn-Baker, Yakov Smirnoff, and Didi Conn joined the cast.
