= Plan B Entertainment =

American film production company

Plan B Entertainment, Inc.
- Logo used since 2001
- Type: Division
- Industry: Film; Entertainment
- Predecessor: Brad Grey Pictures
- Founded: November 2, 2001; 25 years ago
- Founders: Brad Pitt; Brad Grey; Kristin Hahn; Jennifer Aniston
- Headquarters: 9150 Wilshire Boulevard; Beverly Hills, California, U.S.
- Key people: Brad Pitt (Chairman and CEO); Dede Gardner (co-president); Jeremy Kleiner (co-president)
- Products: Films; Television films; Television shows
- Parent: Mediawan (60%)

Plan B Entertainment, Inc., more commonly known as Plan B, is an American film production company founded on November 2, 2001 by Brad Pitt, Brad Grey, Kristin Hahn and Jennifer Aniston. The company first signed with Warner Bros. as a replacement for Brad Grey Pictures, a company operated by Brad Grey. In 2005, after Pitt and Aniston divorced, Grey became the CEO of Paramount Pictures and Pitt became the sole owner of the company. The president of the company was for many years Dede Gardner, but she and Pitt named Jeremy Kleiner co-president with Gardner in 2013. Three of the company's movies, The Departed, 12 Years a Slave and Moonlight, have won the Academy Award for Best Picture.

Pitt, Gardner and Kleiner received the Producers Guild of America's David O. Selznick Achievement Award in Theatrical Motion Pictures in 2020.

This name was previously used for an unrelated production company that was headed by Bruce Berman from 1996 to 1997.

In December 2022, it was reported that Mediawan has acquired 60% of the studio, while Plan B has also taken a stake in Mediawan.

== Production deals ==
=== Active ===
- Metro-Goldwyn-Mayer (2020–present)
- Warner Bros. Pictures (2002–2005; 2020–present)
- Amazon MGM Studios (2020–present)

=== Former ===
- Annapurna Pictures (2017–2020)
- New Regency (2014–2017)
- RatPac Entertainment (2014–2017)
- Paramount Pictures (2005–2013)

== Films ==
=== 2000s ===
Year	Title	Director	Distributor	Oscar Best Picture
2004	Troy	Wolfgang Petersen	Warner Bros. Pictures	
2005	Charlie and the Chocolate Factory	Tim Burton	Warner Bros. Pictures	
2006	The Departed	Martin Scorsese	Warner Bros. Pictures	Won
2006	Running with Scissors	Ryan Murphy	TriStar Pictures	
2007	Year of the Dog	Mike White	Paramount Vantage	
2007	A Mighty Heart	Michael Winterbottom	Paramount Vantage	
2007	The Assassination of Jesse James by the Coward Robert Ford	Andrew Dominik	Warner Bros. Pictures	
2009	The Private Lives of Pippa Lee	Rebecca Miller	Screen Media Films	
2009	The Time Traveler's Wife	Robert Schwentke	Warner Bros. Pictures	

=== 2010s ===
Year	Title	Director	Distributor	Oscar Best Picture
2010	Kick-Ass	Matthew Vaughn	Lionsgate Films	
2010	Eat, Pray, Love	Ryan Murphy	Columbia Pictures	
2011	The Tree of Life	Terrence Malick	Fox Searchlight Pictures	Nominated
2011	Moneyball	Bennett Miller	Columbia Pictures	Nominated
2012	Killing Them Softly	Andrew Dominik	The Weinstein Company	
2013	Kick Ass 2	Jeff Wadlow	Universal Pictures	
2013	World War Z	Marc Forster	Paramount Pictures	
2013	12 Years a Slave	Steve McQueen	Fox Searchlight Pictures	Won
2014	Selma	Ava DuVernay	Paramount Pictures	Nominated
2015	True Story	Rupert Goold	Fox Searchlight Pictures	
2015	The Big Short	Adam McKay	Paramount Pictures	Nominated
2016	Moonlight	Barry Jenkins	A24	Won
2016	The Lost City of Z	James Gray	Amazon Studios; Bleecker Street	
2016	Voyage of Time	Terrence Malick	IMAX Corporation	
2017	War Machine	David Michod	Netflix	
2017	Okja	Bong Joon-ho	Netflix	
2017	Brad's Status	Mike White	Amazon Studios	
2018	Beautiful Boy	Felix Van Groeningen	Amazon Studios	
2018	If Beale Street Could Talk	Barry Jenkins	Annapurna Pictures	
2018	Vice	Adam McKay	Annapurna Pictures	Nominated
2019	The Last Black Man in San Francisco	Joe Talbot	A24	
2019	Ad Astra	James Gray	20th Century Fox	
2019	The King	David Michôd	Netflix	

=== 2020s ===
Year	Title	Director	Distributor	Oscar Best Picture
2020	Irresistible	Jon Stewart	Focus Features	
2020	Kajillionaire	Miranda July	Focus Features	
2020	Minari	Lee Isaac Chung	A24	Nominated
2022	Father of the Bride	Gary Alazraki	Warner Bros. Pictures	
2022	Blonde	Andrew Dominik	Netflix	
2022	She Said	Maria Schrader	Universal Pictures	
2022	Women Talking	Sarah Polley	United Artists Releasing	Nominated
2023	Landscape with Invisible Hand	Cory Finley	Metro-Goldwyn-Mayer	
2023	The Killer	David Fincher	Netflix	
2024	Bob Marley: One Love	Reinaldo Marcus Green	Paramount Pictures	
2024	Beetlejuice Beetlejuice	Tim Burton	Warner Bros. Pictures	
2024	Apocalypse in the Tropics	Petra Costa	Netflix	
2024	One to One: John & Yoko	Kevin Macdonald	Magnolia Pictures	
2024	Nickel Boys	RaMell Ross	Amazon MGM Studios	Nominated
2024	Wolfs	Jon Watts	Apple TV+	
2025	Mickey 17	Bong Joon-ho	Warner Bros. Pictures	
2025	Olmo	Fernando Eimbcke	Greenwich Entertainment	
2025	Bono: Stories of Surrender	Andrew Dominik	Apple TV+	
2025	F1	Joseph Kosinski	Warner Bros. Pictures; Apple TV+	Nominated
2025	It's Never Over, Jeff Buckley	Amy Berg	Magnolia Pictures	
2025	Preparation for the Next Life	Bing Liu	Amazon MGM Studios	
2025	Anemone	Ronan Day-Lewis	Focus Features	
2025	Hedda	Nia DaCosta	Amazon MGM Studios	
2025	The Voice of Hind Rajab	Kaouther Ben Hania	Willa	
2025	H Is for Hawk	Philippa Lowthorpe	Roadside Attractions	
2026	Teenage Sex and Death at Camp Miasma	Jane Schoenbrun	Mubi	
2026	The Further Mis-Adventures of Cliff Booth	David Fincher	Netflix	

=== Upcoming ===
Year	Title	Director	Distributor
TBA	The Chaperones	India Donaldson	A24
TBA	Isle of Man	Reid Carolin	Amazon MGM Studios
TBA	The Riders	Edward Berger	A24
TBA	Wizards!	David Michôd	A24

== Television ==
=== 2000s ===
Year	Title	Network	Notes
2008	Pretty/Handsome	FX	Pilot not picked up for series.

=== 2010s ===
Year	Title	Network	Notes
2014–2015	Resurrection	ABC	Cancelled after two seasons.
2014–2016	Deadbeat	Hulu	Cancelled after three seasons.
2014	Nightingale	HBO	Television film
2014	The Normal Heart	HBO	Television film
2016–2019	The OA	Netflix	Cancelled after two seasons.
2017–2024	Feud	FX	Cancelled after two seasons.
2018–2019	Sweetbitter	Starz	Cancelled after two seasons.

=== 2020s ===
Year	Title	Network	Notes
2020–present	Lego Masters	Fox	Series ongoing
2020	The Third Day	Sky Atlantic, HBO	Miniseries
2021	The Underground Railroad	Amazon Prime Video	Miniseries
2022–2024	Outer Range	Amazon Prime Video	Canceled after two seasons
2022	Paper Girls	Amazon Prime Video	Cancelled after one season
2022	High School	Amazon Freevee	Cancelled after one season
2023	Wayne Shorter: Zero Gravity	Amazon Prime Video	Docuseries
2024–present	3 Body Problem	Netflix	Renewed for seasons 2 and 3
2025	Adolescence	Netflix	Miniseries
