= Viola Liuzzo =

American activist and murder victim (1925–1965)

- Picture of Gregg, 1949
- Born: Viola Fauver Gregg; April 11, 1925; California, Pennsylvania, U.S.
- Died: March 25, 1965 (aged 39); Selma, Alabama, U.S.
- Cause of death: Assassination (gunshot wounds)
- Resting place: Holy Sepulchre Cemetery Southfield, Michigan, U.S.
- Occupations: Housewife, civil rights activist
- Children: 5

Viola Fauver Liuzzo (née Gregg; April 11, 1925 – March 25, 1965) was an American civil rights activist. In March 1965 she drove from her home in Detroit, Michigan to Alabama to support the Selma to Montgomery march for voting rights. On March 25 she was shot dead by three members of the Ku Klux Klan while driving activists between the cities.

An FBI informant, Gary T. Rowe, was involved in her death. His role in this and other events was not revealed until 1978. To deflect attention from the FBI, its head J. Edgar Hoover made defamatory claims about Liuzzo.

Three of her killers (not including Rowe) were charged with murder by the state but not convicted. The federal government charged the three Klan members with conspiracy to intimidate African Americans under the 1871 Ku Klux Klan Act, a Reconstruction era civil rights statute. On December 3, the trio was found guilty by an all-white, all-male jury, a landmark in Southern legal history. They were sentenced to ten years in prison. Rowe testified in this case and was put in the witness protection program for his safety. He lived until 1998.

In 1983, after learning about the FBI's activities related to the Liuzzo case, her family filed a lawsuit against the FBI for not preventing her death and for damages because of false accusations. The suit was ultimately dismissed. Liuzzo was given many honors posthumously; her name was inscribed on the Civil Rights Memorial in Montgomery, Alabama. Her grandson set up a scholarship in her honor.

== Early life and education ==
Viola Fauver Gregg was born on April 11, 1925, in the small town of California, Pennsylvania, the elder daughter of Eva Wilson, a teacher, and Heber Ernest Gregg, a coal miner and World War I veteran. Her father had taught himself to read as a child and left school in the eighth grade. Her mother had a teaching certificate from Southwestern Pennsylvania Normal School (later California University of Pennsylvania and currently Pennsylvania Western University, California). The couple had a second daughter, Rose Mary, in 1930.

Heber lost his right hand in a mine explosion when they were living in Georgia. It was during the Great Depression, and the Greggs became solely dependent on Eva's income. She had difficulty finding anything other than short-term teaching positions. Struggling with poverty, when Viola was six the family decided to move from Georgia to Chattanooga, Tennessee, where Eva found a teaching position.

The family was very poor and lived in one-room shacks with no running water. The schools Liuzzo attended did not have adequate supplies, and teachers had little time to deal with the many children in need. Because the family moved so often, Liuzzo usually began and ended the year in different schools. Having been poor in Tennessee for much of her childhood and adolescence, she was close to the racially segregated nature of the South. This would have a powerful influence on her activism.

== Michigan ==
In 1941, the Gregg family moved to Ypsilanti, Michigan, where her father sought work to assemble bombs at the Ford Motor Co. Viola dropped out of high school after a year and eloped at the age of 16. Her marriage did not last, and she returned to her family.

Two years later, the Gregg family moved to Detroit, Michigan, which was segregated by race. Tensions between whites and blacks were very high as they competed for jobs and housing in a city with many new residents, including immigrants. In the early 1940s there was violence and rioting between racial and ethnic groups. Viola Gregg witnessed some of these, which influenced her later civil rights work.

== Marriage and family ==
In 1943, she married George Argyris, the manager of a restaurant where she worked. They had two children, Penny and Evangeline Mary. They divorced in 1949.

Two years later, Gregg married Anthony Liuzzo, a Teamsters union business agent. They had three children together: Tommy, Anthony Jr., and Sally. They also raised her first two daughters.

Liuzzo wanted to gain more education and trained to become a medical laboratory assistant at the Carnegie Institute in Detroit, Michigan. In 1962 she enrolled part-time at Wayne State University to continue her education.

In 1964, she began attending the First Unitarian Universalist Church of Detroit and joined the National Association for the Advancement of Colored People (NAACP).

A large part of Liuzzo's activism, particularly with the NAACP, developed from her close friendship with Sarah Evans, an African-American woman. They had met at a grocery store where Liuzzo worked as a cashier, and kept in touch. Liuzzo hired Evans to help with her child care. After taking on more, she promoted Evans to her fulltime nanny and housekeeper. The two women had both grown up in the South, and found they had similar views on some issues, including support for the civil rights movement. After Liuzzo's death, Evans became the permanent caretaker of her friend's five young children.

== Local activism ==
Liuzzo protested against Detroit's laws that allowed students to drop out of school more easily. Instead, she wanted families to be helped to get their children educated. She temporarily withdrew her own children from public school to express her opposition to the law. Because she publicly home-schooled them for two months, Liuzzo was arrested. She pleaded guilty in court and was placed on probation.

== Selma, Alabama ==
In the early 1960s, activism increased in the South, especially for voting rights. In February 1965, a night demonstration for voting rights at the Marion, Alabama, courthouse turned violent. State troopers clubbed marchers; they beat and fatally shot Jimmie Lee Jackson, a 26-year-old African-American man. His death spurred the fight for civil rights in nearby Selma, the larger county seat of Dallas County.

Organizers had asked for help from Rev. Martin Luther King Jr., who had been active in efforts to desegregate Birmingham, Alabama. He led the Southern Christian Leadership Conference (SCLC), whose members planned a protest march for Sunday, March 7, 1965. Gov. George Wallace banned the march, but activists ignored his ban.

Six hundred unarmed marchers headed for the Edmund Pettus Bridge to cross the Alabama River and go to the state capital were clubbed and whipped by state troopers, fracturing bones and gashing heads. Seventeen people were hospitalized on the day later called "Bloody Sunday".

Like many observers, Liuzzo was horrified by the images broadcast and published by national media. A second march took place March 9. Troopers, police, and marchers confronted each other at the county end of the bridge, but when the troopers stepped aside to let them pass, the Rev. Martin Luther King Jr. led the marchers back to Brown Church, which was the base.

That night, a white group beat and murdered civil rights activist James Reeb, a Unitarian Universalist minister from Boston, who had come to Selma for the second march. Many other clergy and sympathizers from across the country had also gathered for the second march.

On March 16, Liuzzo took part in a protest at Wayne State. She decided to do more. She called her husband to tell him she would be traveling to Selma to respond to Rev. King's call for people of all faiths to come, saying that the struggle "was everybody's fight." Leaving her children in the care of family and friends, she drove to Selma to volunteer her support.

There she contacted the SCLC and was put to work delivering aid, welcoming and recruiting volunteers, and transporting volunteers and marchers to and from airports, bus terminals, and train stations. She volunteered the use of her car, a 1963 Oldsmobile.

On March 21, 1965, more than 3,000 people began the third march. They were blacks, whites, working-class people, doctors, nurses, priests, nuns, rabbis, homemakers, students, actors, and farmers. Many notable civil rights leaders participated, including Martin Luther King Jr., and his wife Coretta Scott King, Ralph Abernathy, Ralph Bunche, and Andrew Young. It took five days for the protesters to reach their goal of Montgomery, the state capital. Along the way, other protesters joined and by the last day, some 25,000 marchers entered Montgomery. The event received widespread media coverage.

Liuzzo marched the first full day and returned to Selma for the night. On Wednesday, March 24, she rejoined the march four miles from the end. A celebration took place that night with national entertainers. Liuzzo helped at the first aid station. On Thursday, Liuzzo and other marchers reached the state capitol building, which still flew a Confederate flag together with the state flag. Rev. King Jr. addressed the crowd of 25,000, calling the march a "shining moment in American history."

== Assassination ==
After the march, Liuzzo, assisted by Leroy Moton, a 19-year-old African American, continued shuttling marchers and volunteers from Montgomery back to Selma in her car. James Orange, an SCLC veteran, warned her that it was very dangerous and she should not drive to Montgomery.

As Liuzzo and Moton were driving along Route 80 to Selma, a car tried to force them off the road. After dropping passengers off, she and Moton headed back to Montgomery. While getting gas at a local filling station, they were subject to abusive, racist comments by other customers.

Liuzzo was stopped at a red light when a car with four white men pulled up alongside. When they saw the white woman and black man together, they followed Liuzzo as she tried to outrun them. They overtook the Oldsmobile and shot directly at Liuzzo, mortally wounding her twice in the head. The car veered into a ditch, crashing into a fence. The men were found to be members of the local Ku Klux Klan, including Gary Thomas Rowe, an FBI informant.

The bullets missed Moton, but he was covered with Liuzzo's blood. He lay motionless as the Klansmen checked their victims. After they left, Moton sought help. He flagged down a truck driven by Rev. Leon Riley, who had also been shuttling civil rights workers to Selma.

=== Funeral ===
Liuzzo's funeral was held on March 30 at Immaculate Heart of Mary Catholic Church in Detroit. Many prominent members of the civil rights movement, unions, and state government came to pay their respects. Among them were Martin Luther King Jr., NAACP executive director Roy Wilkins, Congress on Racial Equality national leader James Farmer, Michigan lieutenant governor William G. Milliken, Teamsters president Jimmy Hoffa, and United Auto Workers president Walter Reuther.

Less than two weeks after her death, a charred cross was found in front of four Detroit homes, including the Liuzzo residence. The Ku Klux Klan had been active in Detroit in the early 20th century, but had declined after scandals in the early 1920s. This was one of their signs for intimidation.

== Arrest and legal proceedings ==
The four Klan members in the car—Collie Wilkins (21), FBI informant Gary Rowe (34), William Eaton (41), and Eugene Thomas (43)—were quickly arrested. President Lyndon Johnson announced the arrests within 24 hours on national television. He focused on the positive work of FBI agents' solving Liuzzo's murder. The government wanted to divert scrutiny from the fact that one of the men, Gary Thomas Rowe Jr., was an FBI informant.

Wilkins, Eaton, and Thomas were indicted on April 22 in the State of Alabama for Liuzzo's death. FBI informant Rowe served as a witness. Rowe testified that Wilkins had fired two shots on the order of Thomas.

The Department of Justice charged the three defendants with conspiracy to intimidate African Americans under the 1871 Ku Klux Klan Act, a Reconstruction civil rights statute. The charges did not specifically refer to Liuzzo's murder. On December 3, the trio was found guilty by an all-white, all-male jury, and were sentenced to ten years in prison, a landmark in Southern legal history.

Wilkins and Thomas were free on bail while appealing their cases. They were each arrested and convicted of firearms violations, and sentenced to jail for those crimes. During this period, the January 15, 1966, edition of The Birmingham News published an ad offering Liuzzo's bullet-ridden car for sale. Asking $3,500, the ad read, "Do you need a crowd-getter? I have a 1963 Oldsmobile two-door in which Mrs. Viola Liuzzo was killed. Bullet holes and everything intact. Ideal to bring in crowds."

After all three defendants were convicted of the federal charges, state murder cases proceeded against Eaton and Thomas. Eaton, who had not previously been jailed, died of a heart attack on March 10.

The jury acquitted Thomas of the state murder charge after 90 minutes of deliberations.

On April 27, 1967, the Fifth Circuit Court of Appeals in New Orleans upheld the federal convictions of the surviving defendants. Thomas served six years in prison for the crime. Wilkins served seven years.

Due to threats from the Klan, both before and after his testimony, Gary Thomas Rowe went into the federal witness protection program. He died in 1998 in Savannah, Georgia, after having lived several decades under several assumed identities.

== FBI's cover-up and leaks ==
Within 24 hours of Liuzzo's assassination by the Ku Klux Klan and the FBI's informant Gary Thomas Rowe, J. Edgar Hoover launched a smear campaign against Liuzzo. He leaked false information to the press, subordinate FBI agents, and select politicians, claiming that there were "puncture marks in her arm indicating recent use of a hypodermic needle; she was sitting very, very close to that negro in the car; that it has the appearance of a necking party."

While attempting to hide the fact that an FBI informant was in the attack car, the FBI wanted to ensure that the agency was not held responsible for permitting its informant to participate in violent acts, without FBI surveillance or backup. Rowe had been an informant for the FBI since 1960. The FBI was aware that Rowe had participated in violent acts with KKK members. These included an attack on the Freedom Riders in 1961, and having a role in the 16th Street Baptist Church bombing in Birmingham in September 1963.

Prior to the shooting, Rowe had called his FBI contact to tell him that he and other Klansman were traveling to Montgomery, and that violence was planned. During the investigation, the FBI did not test Rowe's gun or the bullet casings for his fingerprints.

The results of autopsy testing, which was conducted in 1965, revealed that Liuzzo's system did not contain any traces of drugs. It also showed that she had not recently had sex at the time of her death.

It was not until 1978 that the FBI's role in the smear campaign was uncovered, when Liuzzo's children obtained case documents from the FBI under the Freedom of Information Act.

== Legislation and subsequent lawsuits ==
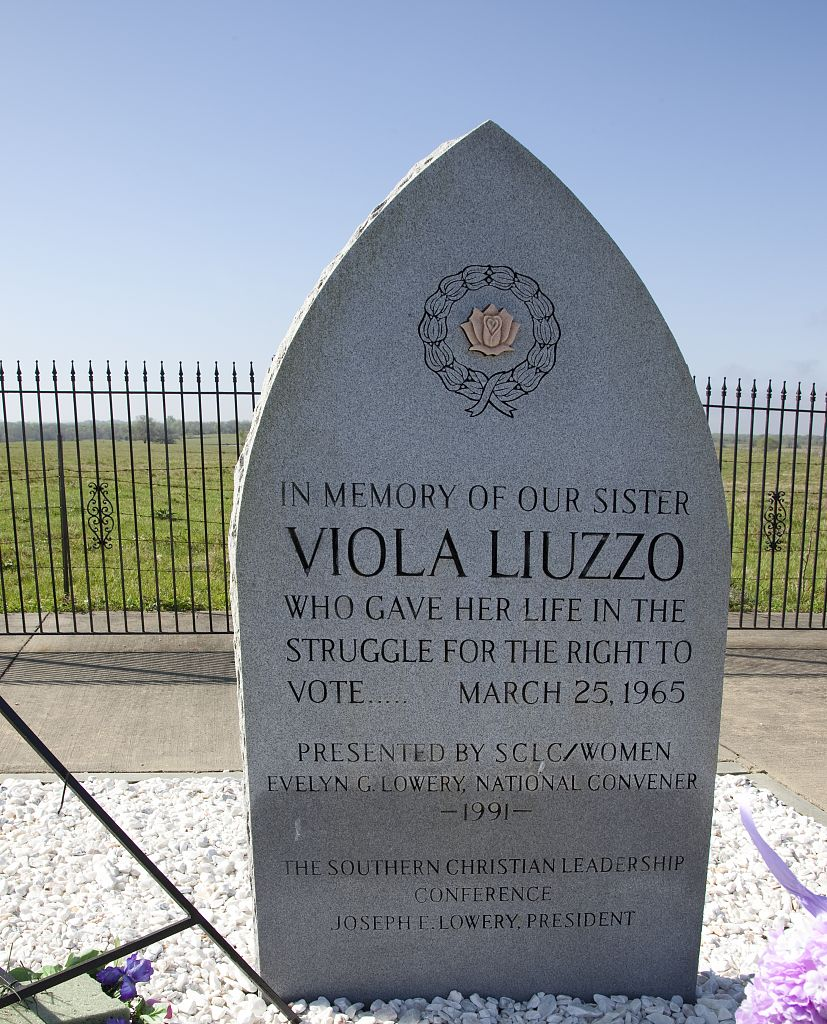
Memorial to Viola Liuzzo in Lowndes County, Alabama

Liuzzo was condemned at the time by different racist organizations for having brought her death upon herself. Her decision to be part of such a dangerous undertaking was seen by some as controversial for a married mother of five.

Rowe was indicted in 1978 and tried for his involvement in the murder. The first trial ended in a hung jury, and the second trial ended in his acquittal.

The Liuzzo family sued the FBI for the death of Liuzzo and associated damages. On May 27, 1983, Judge Charles Wycliffe Joiner rejected the claims, saying there was "no evidence the FBI was in any type of joint venture with Rowe or conspiracy against Mrs. Liuzzo. Rowe's presence in the car was the principal reason why the crime was solved so quickly." Liuzzo family lawyer Dean A. Robb said, "This is a terrible opinion. I'm shocked. I think this is incredible."

In August 1983, the FBI was awarded $79,873 in court costs. These costs were later reduced to $3,645 after the ACLU appealed on behalf of the family.

== Legacy ==
The Walter P. Reuther Library of Wayne State University contains original archival material related to Liuzzo and her case. The 'Viola Liuzzo Papers' contain documentation of the events of the murder, the resulting investigation, and the later legal actions taken by the Liuzzo Family.

The papers also contain FBI murder investigation files and completed Freedom of Information and Privacy Act (FOIPA) requests for the release of documents that documented the FBI's involvement with the Ku Klux Klan. Several documents are also related to the FBI, informants, and the Freedom Riders.

== Representation in art and media ==
Liuzzo was featured in part 3 of a TV series, Free at Last: Civil Rights Heroes.

Her murder was shown in episode 2 of the King miniseries.

In 2004, Liuzzo was the subject of a documentary, Home of the Brave.

Episode 3 of the sixth season of the CBS crime drama Cold Case, "Wednesday's Women", was loosely based on Liuzzo's story.

In 2008, Liuzzo was memorialized in a song, "Color Blind Angel", by the late blues singer Robin Rogers on her album Treat Me Right.

Laura Nessler wrote the play Outside Agitators (2014), based on Liuzzo. It premiered at the Prop Theater in Chicago, Illinois, on September 20, 2014.

Liuzzo was played by Tara Ochs in the 2014 film Selma.

== Honors ==
Viola Liuzzo Park is located at Winthrop and Trojan in Detroit.

Liuzzo's name is inscribed on the Civil Rights Memorial in Montgomery, Alabama, created by Maya Lin. In 2011, the Viola Liuzzo Ethics Scholarship was started at Adrian College by her grandson, Joshua James Liuzzo.

In 2015, Wayne State University bestowed its first posthumous honorary doctorate degree to Liuzzo.

In 2019, a statue which honors Liuzzo was unveiled in Detroit.

In 2021, Michigan Secretary of State Jocelyn Benson ordered the re-issue of the 1965 Winter/Water Wonderland license plates, in homage to Liuzzo; one was on her car when she drove from Detroit to Alabama. Secretary Benson said she had started her career in Montgomery, Alabama, and was moved by Liuzzo's advocacy to try to gain the vote for all people.

== See also ==
- James Reeb
- William Lewis Moore
- Murders of Chaney, Goodman, and Schwerner
- List of unsolved murders (1900–1979)
- Lynching in the United States
- Selma to Montgomery marches
