= Dede Gardner =

American film producer (born 1967)

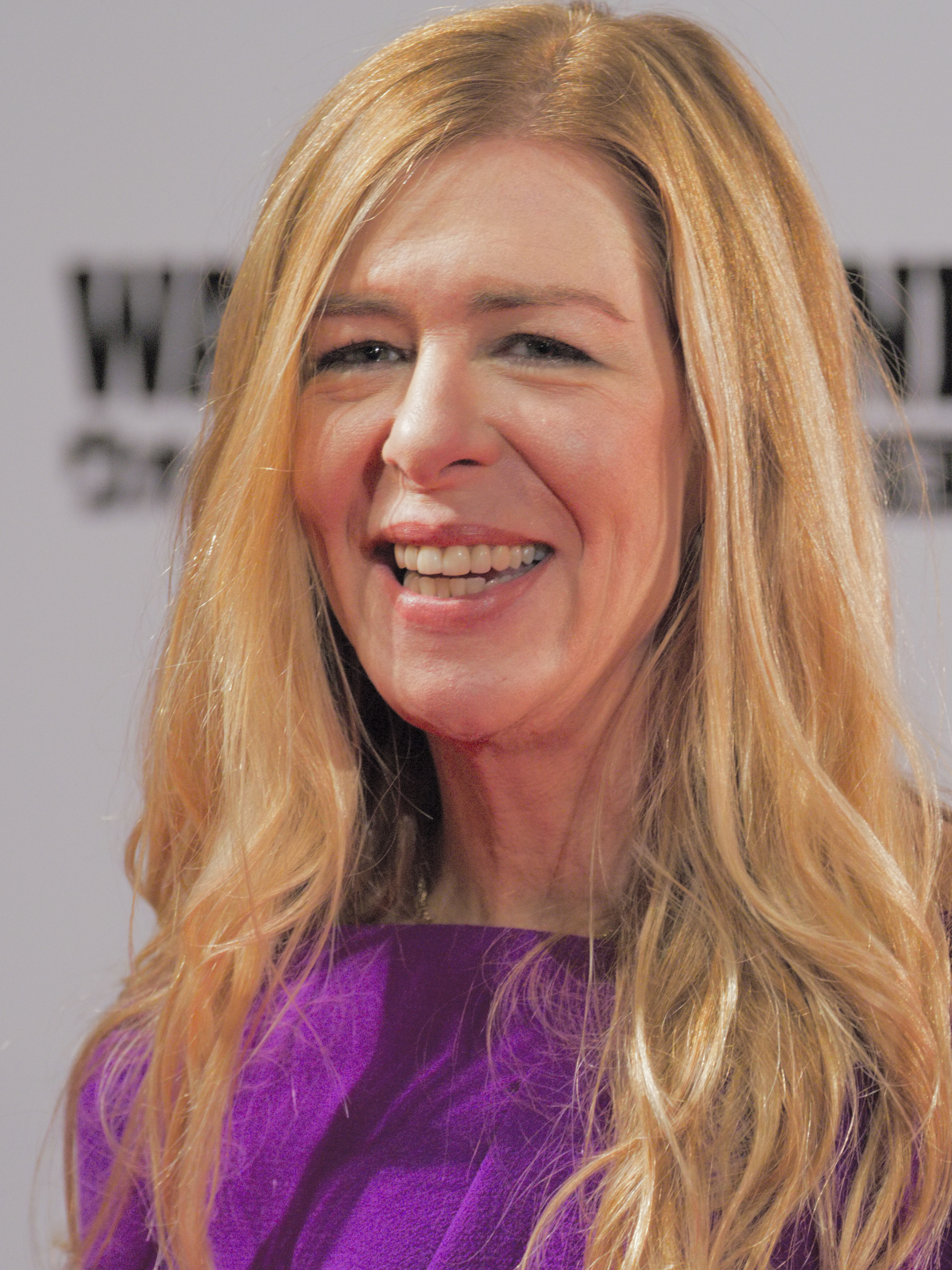
- Gardner in 2017
- Born: Dorcas Wright Gardner; October 16, 1967 (age 59); Chicago, Illinois, U.S.
- Education: Columbia University (BA)
- Occupation: Film producer
- Years active: 2006–present
- Title: Co-President of Plan B Entertainment
- Spouse: Jonathan Boris Berg (m. 2000)

Dorcas Wright "Dede" Gardner (born October 16, 1967) is an American film producer.

== Early life ==
Gardner is the daughter of Dorothy and John Gardner, of Chicago, Illinois. She graduated cum laude from Columbia University in 1990. Her classmates included television showrunners Jeff Rake and Gina Fattore. Her father is a partner at the Chicago investment bank William Blair & Company; her mother is president of the Michael Reese Health Trust.

== Career ==
Gardner was president since the founding of Plan B Entertainment and currently serving as co-president with Jeremy Kleiner since 2013. She has won Academy Awards for producing the films 12 Years a Slave (2013) and Moonlight (2016), becoming the first woman to win two Academy Awards for Best Picture. She has also been nominated in the category for The Tree of Life (2011), Selma (2014), The Big Short (2015), Vice (2018), Women Talking (2022), Nickel Boys (2024) and F1 (2025), making her the most nominated female producer in Academy Awards history.

== Personal life ==
In 2000, she married Jonathan Boris Berg in an Episcopalian ceremony on Martha's Vineyard.

== Filmography ==
She was a producer in all films unless otherwise noted.

=== Film ===
Year	Film	Credit	Notes	Ref.
2006	Running with Scissors			
2007	Year of the Dog			
2007	A Mighty Heart			
2007	The Assassination of Jesse James by the Coward Robert Ford			
2009	The Private Lives of Pippa Lee			
2009	The Time Traveler's Wife			
2010	Eat Pray Love			
2011	The Tree of Life			
2012	Killing Them Softly			
2013	World War Z			
2013	12 Years a Slave			
2014	Nightingale	Executive producer		
2014	Selma			
2015	True Story			
2015	The Big Short			
2016	Moonlight			
2016	The Lost City of Z			
2017	Okja			
2017	War Machine			
2017	Brad's Status			
2018	Beautiful Boy			
2018	If Beale Street Could Talk			
2018	Vice			
2019	The Last Black Man in San Francisco			
2019	Ad Astra			
2019	The King			
2020	Kajillionaire			
2020	Minari			
2020	Irresistible			
2022	Father of the Bride			
2022	Women Talking			
2022	Blonde			
2022	She Said			
2023	Landscape with Invisible Hand			
2024	Bob Marley: One Love			
2024	Beetlejuice Beetlejuice			
2024	Apocalypse in the Tropics	Executive producer		
2024	Wolfs			
2024	Nickel Boys			
2025	Mickey 17			
2025	Olmo		It was screened in Panorama at the 75th Berlin International Film Festival in February 2025.	
2025	Bono: Stories of Surrender			
2025	F1			
2025	Preparation for the Next Life			
2025	H Is for Hawk			
2025	The Voice of Hind Rajab	Executive producer		
2025	Hedda			
2026	Teenage Sex and Death at Camp Miasma			
TBA	The Tiger			
TBA	Wizards!			
TBA	Wrong Answer			
TBA	Weekend Warriors			

Location management

Year	Film	Role
1992	Mac	Location assistant
1993	Three of Hearts	Location manager: New York

Thanks

Year	Film	Role
2004	See This Movie	Many thanks
2016	The Tiger Hunter	Thanks
2017	Marrowbone	The director wishes to thank

=== Television ===
Year	Title	Credit	Notes	Ref.
2008	Pretty/Handsome	Executive producer	Television pilot	
2014	Deadbeat			
2014	The Normal Heart	Executive producer	Television film	
2014	POV	Executive producer	Documentary	
2014	Resurrection	Executive producer		
2016	Mamma Dallas	Executive producer	Television pilot	
2017	Feud	Executive producer		
2017	Monsters of God	Executive producer	Television pilot	
2016−19	The OA	Executive producer		
2018−19	Sweetbitter	Executive producer		
2020	The Third Day: Autumn	Executive producer	Television special	
2020	The Third Day	Executive producer		
2021	The Underground Railroad	Executive producer		
2020−21	Lego Masters	Executive producer		
2022	Outer Range	Executive producer		
2022	Paper Girls	Executive producer		
2022	High School	Executive producer		
2024	3 Body Problem	Executive producer		
2025	Adolescence	Executive producer		
TBA	Wytches			

== Awards and nominations ==
In 2012, Gardner and her fellow producers were nominated for the Academy Award for Best Picture for The Tree of Life. In 2014, she won the Academy Award for Best Picture for the movie 12 Years a Slave alongside co-producers Brad Pitt, Steve McQueen, Jeremy Kleiner and Anthony Katagas. In 2015, she was nominated once again for the Academy Award for Best Picture for producing Selma alongside fellow producers Oprah Winfrey, Jeremy Kleiner, and Christian Colson. In 2017, she won her second Academy Award for Best Picture for the movie, Moonlight. She becomes the first female producer to win two Academy Awards for Best Picture.

=== Academy Awards ===
Year	Category	Nominated work	Result	Ref.
2011	Best Picture	The Tree of Life	Nominated	
2013	Best Picture	12 Years a Slave	Won	
2014	Best Picture	Selma	Nominated	
2015	Best Picture	The Big Short	Nominated	
2016	Best Picture	Moonlight	Won	
2018	Best Picture	Vice	Nominated	
2022	Best Picture	Women Talking	Nominated	
2024	Best Picture	Nickel Boys	Nominated	
2025	Best Picture	F1	Nominated	

=== AACTA International Awards ===
Year	Category	Nominated work	Result	Ref.
2011	Best Film	The Tree of Life	Nominated	
2013	Best Film	12 Years a Slave	Nominated	
2015	Best Film	The Big Short	Nominated	

=== AFI Awards ===
Year	Category	Nominated work	Result	Ref.
2011	Top 10 Films	The Tree of Life	Won	
2013	Top 10 Films	12 Years a Slave	Won	
2014	Top 10 Films	Selma	Won	
2015	Top 10 Films	The Big Short	Won	
2016	Top 10 Films	Moonlight	Won	

=== Alliance of Women Film Journalists ===
Year	Category	Nominated work	Result	Ref.
2013	Best Picture	12 Years a Slave	Won	
2014	Best Picture	Selma	Nominated	

=== American Black Film Festival ===
Year	Category	Nominated work	Result	Ref.
2013	Movie of the Year	12 Years a Slave	Nominated	

=== Awards Circuit Community Awards ===
Year	Category	Nominated work	Result	Ref.
2007	Best Motion Picture	The Assassination of Jesse James by the Coward Robert Ford	Nominated	
2011	Best Motion Picture	The Tree of Life	Nominated	
2013	Best Motion Picture	12 Years a Slave	Nominated	
2014	Best Motion Picture	Selma	Nominated	

=== Black Reel Awards ===
Year	Category	Nominated work	Result	Ref.
2013	Best Film	12 Years a Slave	Won	
2014	Best Film	Selma	Won	
2016	Best Film	Moonlight	Won	

=== British Academy Film Awards ===
Year	Category	Nominated work	Result	Ref.
2013	Best Film	12 Years a Slave	Won	
2015	Best Film	The Big Short	Nominated	
2016	Best Film	Moonlight	Nominated	
2025	Outstanding British Film	H Is for Hawk	Nominated	

=== British Academy Television Awards ===
Year	Category	Nominated work	Result	Ref.
2018	Best International Programme	Feud: Bette and Joan	Nominated	
2022	Best International Programme	The Underground Railroad	Won	

=== CinEuphoria Awards ===
Year	Category	Nominated work	Result	Ref.
2013	Best International Film	12 Years a Slave	Nominated	

=== Golden Globe Awards ===
Year	Category	Nominated work	Result	Ref.
2014	Best Limited or Anthology Series or Television Film	The Normal Heart	Nominated	
2017	Best Limited or Anthology Series or Television Film	Feud: Bette and Joan	Nominated	

=== Golden Raspberry Awards ===
Year	Category	Nominated work	Result	Ref.
2022	Worst Picture	Blonde	Won	

=== Gotham Awards ===
Year	Category	Nominated work	Result	Ref.
2013	Best Feature	12 Years a Slave	Nominated	
2013	Audience Award	12 Years a Slave	Nominated	
2014	Best Feature	Nickel Boys	Nominated	

=== Independent Spirit Awards ===
Year	Category	Nominated work	Result	Ref.
2013	Best Film	12 Years a Slave	Won	
2014	Best Film	Selma	Nominated	
2024	Best Film	Nickel Boys	Nominated	

=== Italian Online Movie Awards ===
Year	Category	Nominated work	Result	Ref.
2013	Best Picture	12 Years a Slave	Nominated	

=== Online Film & Television Association Awards ===
Year	Category	Nominated work	Result	Ref.
2007	Best Picture	The Assassination of Jesse James by the Coward Robert Ford	Nominated	
2013	Best Picture	12 Years a Slave	Won	
2014	Best Picture	Selma	Nominated	
2015	Best Picture	The Big Short	Nominated	

=== Primetime Emmy Awards ===
Year	Category	Nominated work	Result	Ref.
2014	Outstanding Television Movie	The Normal Heart	Won	
2015	Outstanding Television Movie	Nightingale	Nominated	
2017	Outstanding Limited Series	Feud: Bette and Joan	Nominated	
2021	Outstanding Limited or Anthology Series	The Underground Railroad	Nominated	
2024	Outstanding Drama Series	3 Body Problem	Nominated	
2025	Outstanding Limited or Anthology Series	Adolescence	Won	

=== Producers Guild of America Awards ===
Year	Category	Nominated work	Result	Ref.
2013	Best Theatrical Motion Picture	12 Years a Slave	Won (Note: Tied with Alfonso Cuarón and David Heyman for Gravity.)	
2014	Outstanding Producer of Long-Form Television	The Normal Heart	Nominated	
2014	Stanley Kramer Award	The Normal Heart	Won	
2014	Visionary Award		Won	
2015	Best Theatrical Motion Picture	The Big Short	Won	
2016	Best Theatrical Motion Picture	Moonlight	Nominated	
2018	Best Theatrical Motion Picture	Vice	Nominated	
2020	David O. Selznick Award		Won	
