= James Reeb =

American activist and minister (1927–1965)

- Born: James Joseph Reeb; January 1, 1927; Wichita, Kansas, U.S.
- Died: March 11, 1965 (aged 38); Selma, Alabama, U.S.
- Cause of death: Murder
- Education: St. Olaf College; Princeton Theological Seminary
- Occupation: Unitarian Universalist minister
- Known for: Civil Rights Movement
- Spouse: Marie Deason
- Children: 4

James Joseph Reeb (January 1, 1927 – March 11, 1965) was an American Unitarian Universalist minister, pastor, and activist during the civil rights movement in Washington, D.C., and Boston, Massachusetts. While participating in the Selma to Montgomery marches actions in Selma, Alabama, in 1965, he was murdered by white segregationists and white supremacists, dying of head injuries in the hospital two days after being severely beaten. Three men were tried for Reeb's murder but were acquitted by an all-white jury. His murder remains officially unsolved.

== Life and career ==
Reeb was born on January 1, 1927, in Wichita, Kansas, to Mae (Fox) and Harry Reeb. He was raised in Kansas and Casper, Wyoming. He attended Natrona County High School and graduated in 1945, after which he joined the Army despite the fact that his commitment to the ministry made him exempt from service. After basic training, he was sent to Anchorage, Alaska, as a clerk typist for the headquarters of Special Troops. He was honorably discharged eighteen months later in December 1946 as Technical Sergeant, Third Class. After his time in the Army, Reeb continued his schooling. Initially, he attended classes in his hometown at Casper Junior College, before moving on to St. Olaf College, in 1947, where he received his A.B. cum laude in 1950. He then entered Princeton Theological Seminary in Princeton, New Jersey, where he earned his B.D. in 1953. Three days later, Reeb was ordained a Presbyterian minister at the First Presbyterian Church of Casper. After this he accepted a position at the Philadelphia General Hospital as Chaplain to Hospitals for the Philadelphia Presbyter. To become a more effective counselor, he returned to school, enrolling at Conwell School of Theology, and earning an S.T.M. in Pastoral Counseling in 1955.

As a scholar of theology, Reeb grew away from traditionalist Presbyterian teachings and was drawn to the Unitarian Universalist Association (UUA) church. In March 1957, he resigned his Presbyterian Chaplaincy and contacted the American Unitarian Association about transferring his fellowship from Presbyterian to Unitarian. Reeb appreciated the church's emphasis on social action, and he became active in the civil rights movement during the 1960s.

Beginning in his new ministry, Reeb encouraged parishioners to participate in the movement as well. With his wife and four children, he lived in poor black neighborhoods where he felt he could do the best. He took a job that would allow him to work closely with Philadelphia's poor community as a youth director for the West Branch YMCA between 1957 and 1959. While at the YMCA he abolished the racial quota system and started an integrated busing program to transport youth to and from the location. When he was granted a preliminary fellowship by the Unitarians, he accepted an offer to be an assistant minister of All Souls Church in Washington, D.C. After three years of active service at All Souls Church, Reeb was fully ordained as a Unitarian Universalist minister in 1962. In 1964, he began as community relations director for the American Friends Service Committee's Boston Metropolitan Housing Program, focusing on desegregation. At the AFSC, Reeb and his staff advocated for the poor and pressed the city to enforce its housing code, protecting the rights of tenants of all races and backgrounds, particularly poor African and Hispanic Americans. The Reebs were one of the few white families living in Roxbury. James Reeb's daughter Anne recollected that her father "was adamant that you could not make a difference for African-Americans while living comfortably in a white community."

Reeb married Marie Deason on August 20, 1950; they had four children.

== Murder ==
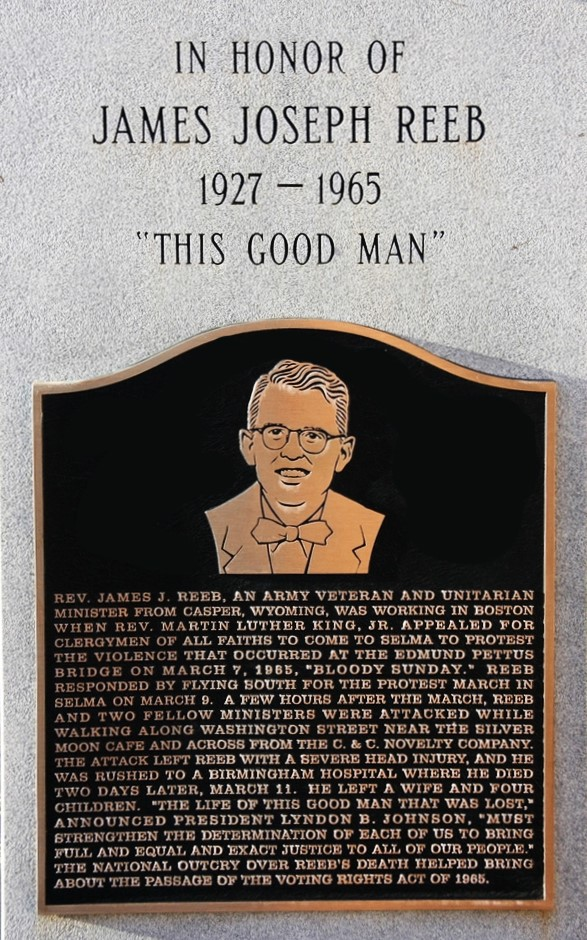
Monument for Reeb in Selma, Alabama

Reeb went to Selma to join the Selma to Montgomery marches, a series of protests for African-American voting rights that followed the murder of Jimmie Lee Jackson in Marion, Alabama, by State Trooper James Bonard Fowler. After the Bloody Sunday attack by state troopers and sheriff's deputies on nonviolent demonstrators on March 7, 1965, Rev Martin Luther King Jr called on ministers and people of all faiths to come to Selma to support the marchers. Reeb was one of 45 ministers and 15 laypersons from the Boston UUA to answer the call. On March 9, 1965, Reeb participated in the second Selma to Montgomery March.

After eating dinner at an integrated restaurant on March 9, Reeb and two other Unitarian ministers, the Rev. Clark Olsen and the Rev. Orloff Miller, were attacked by white men with clubs for their support of African-American rights. The black hospital in Selma did not have the facilities to treat him. Two hours elapsed, and his condition deteriorated, before Reeb arrived at a Birmingham hospital—treatment was not available for him in much closer Montgomery—where doctors performed brain surgery. While Reeb was on his way to the hospital in Birmingham, civil rights leader Martin Luther King Jr. addressed a press conference lamenting the "cowardly" attack and asking all to pray for his protection. Reeb went into a coma and died two days later from his injuries.

Reeb's death resulted in a national outcry against the activities of white racists in the Deep South. Tens of thousands held vigils in his honor. President Lyndon B. Johnson called Reeb's widow and father to express his condolences, and on March 15 invoked Reeb's memory when he delivered a draft of the Voting Rights Act to Congress. The same day, King eulogized Reeb at a ceremony at Brown's Chapel in Selma: "James Reeb symbolizes the forces of goodwill in our nation. He demonstrated the conscience of the nation. He was an attorney for the defense of the innocent in the court of world opinion. He was a witness to the truth that men of different races and classes might live, eat, and work together as brothers." And, King said, "James Reeb says something to each of us, black and white alike—says that we must substitute courage for caution, says to us that we must be concerned not merely about who murdered him but about the system, the way of life."

White supremacists in Alabama, however, reacted differently and tried to manipulate public understanding of how Reeb died. Selma Sheriff Jim Clark falsely stated in an open letter he wrote and distributed that Reeb, whom he identified as the "so-called minister," died after being "thrown out of one beer joint (then) coming out of another when he and his companions had a fight or were beaten by some men." Selma business leaders circulated printed material that falsely claimed Reeb had suffered only a minor injury in Selma and was subsequently killed by civil rights workers who crushed his skull out on a dark road.

The Voting Rights Act was passed on August 6, 1965.

In April 1965, four men—Elmer Cook, William Stanley Hoggle, Namon O'Neal Hoggle, and R.B. Kelley—were indicted in Dallas County, Alabama, for Reeb's murder; three were acquitted after less than 90 minutes of deliberation by an all-white jury that December. The fourth man fled to Mississippi and was not returned by the state authorities for trial.

In July 2007, The Boston Globe reported that the FBI's Cold Case Initiative had reopened the investigation into the 46-year-old case. The renewed investigation was also reported by The Anniston Star and The Clarion-Ledger of Jackson, Mississippi. However, in 2011 the case was closed again, and no charges were pursued. According to the U.S. Department of Justice, the decision to close the case was made upon discovery that three of the four men believed to be responsible for the killing were deceased and that Namon Hoggle, the only surviving individual, was tried and acquitted of the crime in state court, barring him from further prosecution. Namon Hoggle died five years later on August 31, 2016, at age 81.

In memory of James Reeb, in 2013, All Souls Church founded the Reeb Voting Rights Project, which continues to work for the expansion of voting rights and the prevention of disenfranchisement in the U.S.

== National Public Radio investigation ==
NPR Investigative journalists Andrew Beck Grace and Chip Brantley presented the findings of a multi-year investigation in a podcast, White Lies, which aired in May and June 2019. During their investigation Grace and Brantley found an eyewitness, Frances Bowden, and a fifth man, William Portwood, who was involved in the crime. Portwood had not previously been identified.

Grace and Brantley interviewed William Portwood in 2017. At that time, Portwood had suffered from strokes and was experiencing memory lapses. However, he was able to remember having been there. "All I did was kick one of them," Portwood said.

Frances Bowden is the proprietor of Selma Bail Bonds, which was located adjacent to the crime scene. After the death of Namon (Duck) Hoggle, and learning that William Portwood had admitted to being involved, Bowden gave an account of what she saw that night from the window of her business. In summary, she stated that Elmer Cook, William Stanley Hoggle, Duck Hoggle, and William Portwood assaulted Reverends Reeb, Olsen, and Miller. It was Elmer Cook who swung the club and struck Reverend Reeb.

William Portwood died shortly after his last interview with NPR on September 30, 2017.

== Media portrayals and legacy ==
Reeb is portrayed by Jeremy Strong in the film Selma (2014).

A Unitarian Universalist congregation in Madison, Wisconsin bears his name.

== See also ==
- Viola Liuzzo
- William Lewis Moore
- Murders of Chaney, Goodman, and Schwerner
- List of unsolved murders (1900–1979)
