= Tara Ochs =

American actress (born 1976)

- Born: 1976 (age 49–50); Portsmouth, Virginia, United States
- Occupation: Actress
- Years active: 1995–present

Tara Ochs (born 1976) is an American actress. Her film credits include Selma, Life as We Know It, The Fall and Too Many Cooks.

== Personal life ==
Born in Portsmouth, Virginia, Ochs describes herself as a "Navy brat", moving to many places throughout her upbringing. She graduated from the International Baccalaureate program at Pensacola High School and has spent 20 years playing roles in independent films, television, commercials and regional live theater. Ochs attended Florida State University as a theatre major. Ochs currently resides in Atlanta, Georgia.

== Selma ==
In Selma, released in 2014, Ochs plays civil rights activist Viola Liuzzo who was shot and killed by the Ku Klux Klan after answering the call of Martin Luther King Jr. and others and traveling from Detroit, Michigan to the Selma to Montgomery march.

About playing Liuzzo, Ochs said "A lot of this history was new to me. Viola Liuzzo was new to me. I did my research, dug in, watched documentaries - the more I found out, especially about Viola's story, the more I was overwhelmed by the gravity of what she gave, and what so many others gave."

== Filmography ==
=== Film ===
| Year | Title | Role | Notes |
|---|---|---|---|
| 2008 | The Fall | D.A. Eisner | |
| 2009 | Road to the Altar | Smurfette | |
| 2010 | Life as We Know It | Cousin's Wife | |
| 2014 | Selma | Viola Liuzzo | |
| 2015 | SuperCenter | Filming | |
| 2020 | Star Trek First Frontier | Commander Sarah April | |

=== Television ===
| Year | Title | Role | Notes |
|---|---|---|---|
| 2001 | Crossing Jordan | Stacey Ryder | |
| 2001 | Losing Grace | Jean Reed | |
| 2005 | Close to Home | Julie | |
| 2009 | Samantha Who? | Waitress | |
| 2009 | One Tree Hill | Reporter #2 | |
| 2010 | Army Wives | Capt Lydia | |
| 2012 | Single Ladies | Caroline | |
| 2012 | Goodwin vs. Badwin | Mrs. Brickles | |
| 2013 | Your Pretty Face Is Going to Hell | Sports Interviewer | |
| 2014 | Too Many Cooks | Mom Cook | |
| 2016 | Squidbillies | | |
