= Kajillionaire =

2020 film by Miranda July

- Theatrical release poster
- Directed by: Miranda July
- Written by: Miranda July
- Produced by: Dede Gardner; Jeremy Kleiner; Youree Henley
- Starring: Evan Rachel Wood; Debra Winger; Gina Rodriguez; Richard Jenkins
- Cinematography: Sebastian Winterø
- Edited by: Jennifer Vecchiarello
- Music by: Emile Mosseri
- Production companies: Plan B Entertainment; Annapurna Pictures
- Distributed by: Focus Features (United States); Universal Pictures (international)
- Release dates: January 25, 2020 (Sundance); September 25, 2020 (United States)
- Running time: 106 minutes
- Country: United States
- Language: English
- Box office: $1.6 million

Kajillionaire is a 2020 American crime comedy-drama film written and directed by Miranda July. The film stars Evan Rachel Wood, Debra Winger and Richard Jenkins as members of a petty criminal family whose relationship becomes frayed when a stranger played by Gina Rodriguez joins their schemes.

Kajillionaire had its world premiere at the Sundance Film Festival on January 25, 2020, and was released in theaters on September 25, 2020, followed by video on demand on October 16, 2020, by Focus Features in the United States, and by Universal Pictures internationally.

== Plot ==
Old Dolio Dyne, an emotionally stunted 26-year-old woman, is in a manipulative relationship with her con artist parents, Robert and Theresa Dyne, who treat her as an accomplice to their petty thefts and scams rather than as a daughter. The family owes $1,500 of back rent on their apartment in Los Angeles, which is actually a leaking office space attached to a soap factory.

Old Dolio concocts a scam in which they fly to New York City using tickets they won in a contest. On the return flight, her parents will take her luggage at the baggage claim and she will claim the airline has lost it. Old Dolio will then collect on previously purchased travel insurance, which will come out to $1,575.

After an uneventful trip, Old Dolio and her parents return home, with her sitting separately from them. She observes them chatting with Melanie, a friendly young woman in the seat next to them who shares that she is a physician assistant who also lives in Los Angeles. Before the flight lands, Robert and Theresa reveal their scam to Melanie and have her pretend to be their daughter as they pick up the luggage. Old Dolio reports her "lost luggage", but learns it could take up to six weeks to receive the check, so the family looks for alternative methods to obtain the money.

Melanie proves surprisingly amenable to their way of life and reveals she lied about being a physician assistant and is actually a clerk at an eyeglass store. She introduces the family to one of her elderly clients, from whom they steal a blank check and cash it for $650.

A second client, who is dying, asks the group to pretend to be his family as he passes away. Old Dolio is shaken by the experience and hurt when her parents rush to comfort Melanie while ignoring her. Arriving home, Old Dolio finds the insurance check in the mail.

Old Dolio's parents try to initiate a threesome with Melanie, but she reacts badly. They are interrupted by Old Dolio, who is heartbroken to hear her mother call Melanie "hon" and offers her mother the entire travel insurance money to do the same to her. Theresa refuses, but Melanie accepts Old Dolio's offer and takes her to her apartment. Rather than simply call her "hon", Melanie offers a "full-service" treatment, fulfilling emotional needs that Old Dolio's parents failed to meet, including making pancakes and receiving bow-wrapped presents for her birthday.

Old Dolio's parents turn up at Melanie's apartment, telling Old Dolio they love and miss her through the closed door and leaving 17 bow-wrapped birthday presents behind, promising the 18th one (though she is 26 years old) at dinner the next night. She and Melanie show up to the restaurant, although they suspect it is another scam.

Old Dolio's parents give her a necklace as her 18th gift and swear they will change. They return to Melanie's apartment and tuck Old Dolio into bed. Melanie, who has hidden the insurance money in her fuse box, tells her that if her parents steal the money they are monsters and do not love her; Old Dolio says if the money is still there, it is proof her parents have changed. She also comes up with a third possibility: that her parents will have left behind $525, her share of the cash, signifying that they love her but will never be able to offer her anything more. To Melanie and Old Dolio's surprise, when her parents leave and Melanie and Old Dolio check the fuse box, the cash is all there.

The next morning, Melanie and Old Dolio awaken to find that Melanie has been robbed; all removable objects and furnishings, including the cash in the fuse box, are gone. The only things left behind are Old Dolio's 17 presents. Realizing they are refundable, Old Dolio and Melanie take them to be returned.

The total refund comes out to $485.05, until Melanie realizes they forgot to return the necklace. With the addition of the necklace, the total is brought to $525, Old Dolio's 1/3rd share of the insurance money. Old Dolio and Melanie kiss in the store.

== Cast ==
- Evan Rachel Wood as Old Dolio Dyne
- Richard Jenkins as Robert Dyne
- Debra Winger as Theresa Dyne
- Gina Rodriguez as Melanie Whitacre
- Mark Ivanir as Stovik Mann
- Rachel Redleaf as Kelli Medford
- Patricia Belcher as Althea
- Da'Vine Joy Randolph as Jenny
- Diana-Maria Riva as Farida
- Randy Ryan as Jimmy Whitacre
- Jeffrey Nicholas Brown as Businessman
- Adam Bartley as Hot Tub Salesman
- Michelle Gillette as Bartender

== Production ==
In March 2018, it was announced Miranda July would write and direct the film, with Jeremy Kleiner and Dede Gardner producing for Plan B Entertainment, as well as Youree Henley and Annapurna Pictures. The same month, Evan Rachel Wood, Richard Jenkins, Debra Winger and Gina Rodriguez joined the cast. In June 2018, Mark Ivanir joined the cast. Principal photography began in May 2018.

== Music ==
Emile Mosseri composed the soundtrack, which includes a track with Angel Olsen covering Bobby Vinton's "Mr Lonely".

== Release ==
The film had its world premiere at the Sundance Film Festival on January 25, 2020. Shortly after, A24 was announced to be in negotiations to acquire its distribution rights, but Focus Features acquired worldwide rights, with its parent Universal Pictures distributing the film internationally. It was released in theaters on September 25, 2020, followed by video on demand on October 16, 2020. It was previously scheduled to be released on September 18, 2020, and June 19, 2020.

== Reception ==
Rotten Tomatoes lists an approval rating of 90% based on 206 reviews, with an average rating of 7.4/10. The site's critical consensus reads, "Whether you see Kajillionaire as refreshingly unique or simply bizarre will depend on your cinematic adventurousness—and fans of writer-director Miranda July wouldn't have it any other way." On Metacritic, the film has a weighted average score of 78 out of 100, based on reviews from 35 critics, indicating "generally favorable" reviews.

Kajillionaire was nominated for a 2021 GLAAD Media Award.
