= Dean A. Robb =

American attorney (1924–2018)

Dean A. Robb (February 26, 1924 – December 2, 2018) was an American civil rights attorney, constitutional lawyer, and public interest advocate known for his involvement in civil rights litigation, constitutional law, and public interest legal organizations in the United States.

Robb was associated with major civil rights legal efforts during the 1950s and 1960s and worked alongside attorneys and activists connected to the broader Civil rights movement. He became known for litigation involving civil liberties, voting rights, racial equality, and constitutional protections.

== Early life and education ==
Robb was born on February 26, 1924, in Lost Prairie, Illinois, He was raised on a farm during the Great Depression, where his relationship with a poor Black family who lived nearby helped him, as he put it, "line up with the underdog".

Robb attended the University of Illinois before serving in the United States Navy during World War II.

Following military service, Robb attended Wayne State University Law School, earning his Juris Doctor in 1949. According to his friend, Jack Lessenberry, Robb was advised by the school's dean to "get along with the power structure" since there was "no future in law for radicals".

== Legal career ==
In 1949, Robb became a founding partner of Goodman, Crockett, Eden and Robb in Detroit, Michigan, regarded as one of the first interracial law firms in the United States during the civil rights era.

During the early 1960s, Robb helped organize legal defense efforts for Freedom Riders and civil rights activists in the American South. He worked with attorneys and civil rights organizations to challenge unlawful arrests and support voting rights efforts during the movement.

In 1963, Robb organized an interracial conference of Southern lawyers in Atlanta, Georgia, where Martin Luther King Jr. spoke shortly after his release from the Birmingham jail during the Birmingham campaign.

Robb later became nationally known for litigation connected to the death of civil rights activist Viola Liuzzo, who was murdered by members of the Ku Klux Klan during the 1965 Selma to Montgomery marches. Robb represented Liuzzo's family in litigation against the Federal Bureau of Investigation (FBI) concerning FBI involvement connected to the case.

In the 1970s, Robb represented victims of domestic abuse. This included a landmark 1979 case in Otsego County circuit court where he secured the acquittal of a woman accused of murdering her abusive husband, receiving national attention. Robb was co-counsel with Janet Prater.

Robb was also the founder and past president of Trial Lawyers for Public Justice, a national public interest legal organization focused on civil rights, consumer rights, workers’ rights, and constitutional litigation.

In 1986, Robb ran unsuccessfully for a seat on the Michigan Supreme Court, placing third out of 24 candidates. He was nominated by the Democratic Party.

== Awards and recognition ==
Robb received numerous honors during his legal career, including:

- Champion of Justice Award, State Bar of Michigan (1994)
- Champion of Justice Award, Michigan Trial Lawyers Association (1998)
- Michael Franck Award from the State Bar of Michigan for contributions to the legal profession (2004)

Wayne State University Law School later established the Dean Robb Public Interest Lecture in recognition of his contributions to civil rights law and public interest advocacy.

== Death and legacy ==
Robb died on December 2, 2018, in Detroit, Michigan, at the age of 94.

Robb is remembered as a pioneering civil rights attorney who leveraged the law to advance racial equality, protect voting rights, and uphold constitutional protections. His contributions helped set legal precedents in civil liberties and fostered broader participation of minority and public interest advocates in the legal profession.

His son, Matt, published a biography of Robb in 2010 titled Dean Robb: An Unlikely Radical, which won the National Indie Excellence Award for Historical Biography.
