= Justin Chang =

American film critic (born 1983)

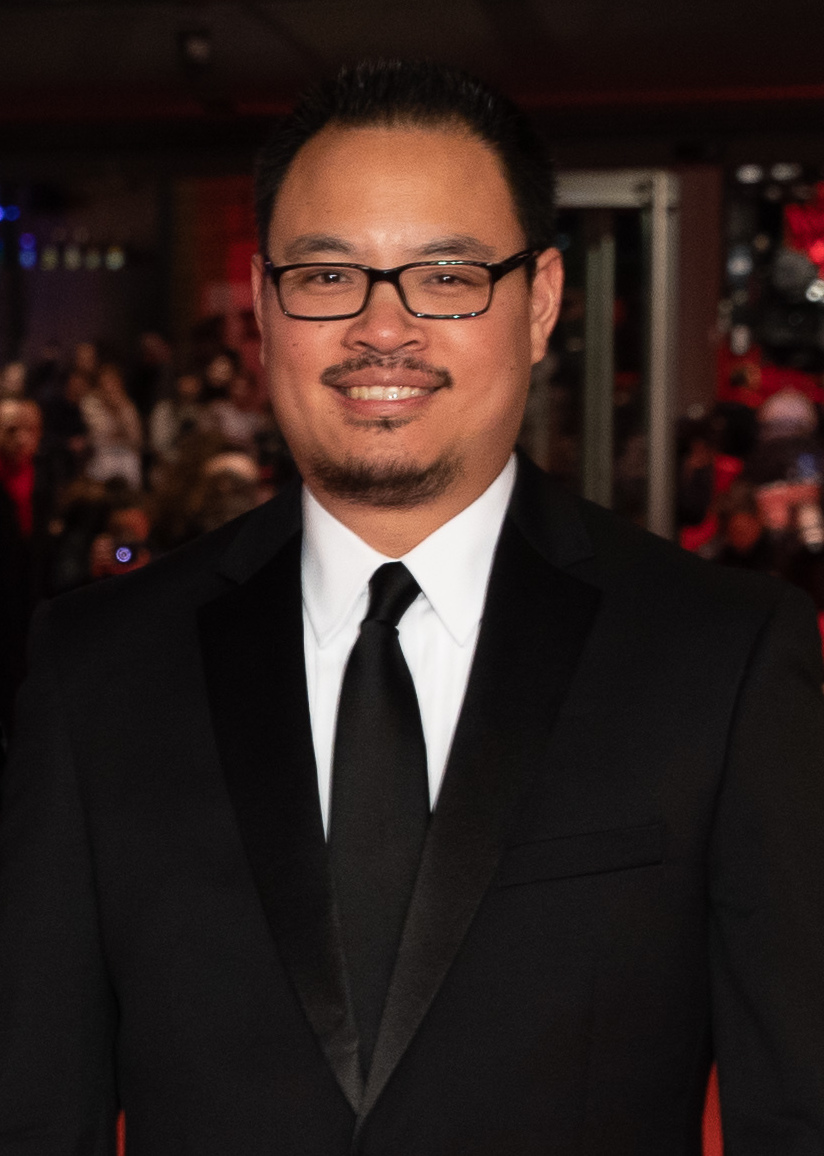
- Chang at the 2019 Berlin International Film Festival
- Born: 1983 (age 42–43); Southern California, U.S.
- Education: University of Southern California (BA)
- Occupation: Film critic
- Years active: 2004–present
- Awards: Pulitzer Prize for Criticism (2024)

Justin Choigee Chang is an American film critic and columnist currently working at The New Yorker. He previously worked for Variety and for Los Angeles Times. His 2023 reviews at the Times won the 2024 Pulitzer Prize for Criticism.

== Early life and education ==
Justin Chang graduated from the University of Southern California in 2004. Chang first became interested in film critique while in high school because he found it fascinating that intelligent people could have very different reactions to films.

== Career ==
Chang was hired by Variety magazine in 2004, and became a senior film critic for the magazine in 2010 before being promoted to its chief film critic in 2013. He is the author of the book FilmCraft: Editing. In 2016, he joined the Los Angeles Times, where he remained until 2024, when he joined The New Yorker. He is a regular contributor to the NPR programs FilmWeek and Fresh Air.

Chang is the chair of the National Society of Film Critics and the secretary of the Los Angeles Film Critics Association. In 2014, he received the inaugural Roger Ebert Award from the African-American Film Critics Association. While accepting the New Generation Award for Creed at the Los Angeles Film Critics Association Awards ceremony in January 2016, American film director and screenwriter Ryan Coogler praised Chang for his contributions to criticism.

Chang won the Pulitzer Prize for Criticism on May 6, 2024, for his articles published during his final year with the Los Angeles Times. His selection of work was led by an opinion piece that defended British-American film director Christopher Nolan's decision to avoid depictions of the atomic bombings of Hiroshima and Nagasaki in his film Oppenheimer (2023).

=== End-of-year lists ===
Chang produces an annual "best-of-the-year" movie list, thereby providing an overview of his critical preferences. His top choices were:

- 2013: Before Midnight
- 2014: Boyhood
- 2015: The Assassin
- 2016: Silence
- 2017: Call Me By Your Name
- 2018: Burning
- 2019: Parasite
- 2020: Vitalina Varela
- 2021: Drive My Car
- 2022: No Bears
- 2023: All of Us Strangers
- 2024: Close Your Eyes
- 2025: Sirāt

== Personal life ==
Chang is a Christian.

== Bibliography ==
- Chang, Justin C. (2011). FilmCraft: Editing. Focal Press. ISBN 978-0-240-81864-1. OCLC 757148890.
