= Wizards! =

Upcoming comedy film

- Directed by: David Michôd
- Screenplay by: David Michôd
- Story by: Joel Edgerton; David Michôd
- Produced by: Dede Gardner; Jeremy Kleiner; Liz Watts
- Starring: Pete Davidson; Franz Rogowski; Naomi Scott; Sean Harris; Orlando Bloom
- Production companies: Plan B Entertainment; See-Saw Films
- Distributed by: A24
- Countries: United States; United Kingdom; Australia
- Language: English

Wizards! is an upcoming stoner comedy film written and directed by David Michôd and starring Pete Davidson, Franz Rogowski, Naomi Scott, Sean Harris, and Orlando Bloom.

== Premise ==
Two hapless, consistently stoned beach-bar operators stumble across stolen loot.

== Cast ==
- Pete Davidson as Steve
- Franz Rogowski as Dieter
- Naomi Scott
- Sean Harris as Zeke
- Orlando Bloom as Rog
- Rahel Romahn as The Man / Alexander

== Production ==
=== Development ===
The screenplay of Wizards! was written by David Michôd, and based on a story by Michôd and Joel Edgerton. It is produced by Dede Gardner and Jeremy Kleiner under the Plan B Entertainment label and Liz Watts of See-Saw Films's Australian office.

=== Casting ===
In May 2022, it was announced that Pete Davidson, Franz Rogowski, Naomi Scott, and Sean Harris were cast in the film. In June that same year, it was announced that Orlando Bloom was added to the cast.

=== Filming ===
The film was shot in Cairns, Queensland, and Cape Tribulation (at Cape Tribulation Resort & Spa) for approximately five weeks, wrapping in August 2022. The production brought approximately 100 jobs and three times as many roles for extras, working with Indigenous women in the area.

== Release ==
Wizards! was expected to be released in 2023. However, at the end of 2023, it was announced that Michôd and A24 were editing a new version of the film. In July 2025, Michôd and Watts were unable to announce a release date and it’s unlikely the film will be released.
