= African-American Film Critics Association Awards 2014 =

Annual US film awards ceremony

12th African-American Film Critics Association Awards

Highlights
- Best Picture: Selma

Below are the winners for the 2014 African-American film Critics Associations.

== Winners ==
- Best Picture:
1. Selma (Winner)
2. The Imitation Game
3. Theory of Everything
4. Birdman or (The Unexpected Virtue of Ignorance)
5. Belle
6. Top Five
7. Unbroken
8. Dear White People
9. Get On Up
10. Black or White

Category	Recipient	Film
Best Actor	David Oyelowo	Selma
Best Actress	Gugu Mbatha-Raw	Belle
Best Director	Ava DuVernay	Selma
Best Screenplay	Gina Prince-Bythewood	Beyond the Lights
Best Supporting Actor	Tyler Perry	Gone Girl
Best Supporting Actor	J. K. Simmons	Whiplash
Best Supporting Actress	Octavia Spencer	Black or White
Best Ensemble		Get on Up
Breakthrough Performance	Tessa Thompson	Dear White People
Best Independent Film		Dear White People
Best Animated Feature		The Boxtrolls
Best World Cinema		Timbuktu
Best Music	John Legend & Common (Glory)	Selma
Best Documentary		Life Itself

== Special categories ==
- Special Achievement: Donna Langley, Stephanie Allain, Franklin Leonard
- Ashley Boone Award: Debra Martin Chase
- Roger Ebert Award: Justin Chang

== See also ==
- 2014 in film
