= Bono: Stories of Surrender =

- Film poster
- Directed by: Andrew Dominik
- Produced by: Meredith Bennett; Dede Gardner; Jon Kamen; Jeremy Kleiner; Brad Pitt; Alec Sash; Dave Sirulnick
- Starring: Bono
- Cinematography: Erik Messerschmidt
- Edited by: Lasse Järvi
- Production companies: Apple Original Films; Plan B Entertainment; RadicalMedia
- Distributed by: Apple TV+
- Release dates: May 16, 2025 (Cannes); May 30, 2025 (Apple TV+)
- Running time: 86 minutes
- Country: United States
- Language: English

Bono: Stories of Surrender is a 2025 American documentary film about the Irish musician Bono, directed by Andrew Dominik. The film documents a 2023 performance by Bono at the Beacon Theatre in New York City during his one-man stage show "Stories of Surrender: An Evening of Words, Music and Some Mischief...", which was undertaken to promote his 2022 memoir Surrender: 40 Songs, One Story. The performance features Bono reciting and acting out passages from his book and performing U2 songs in stripped-down arrangements.

The film had its world premiere at the Special Screenings section of the 78th Cannes Film Festival on May 16, 2025, where it received a seven-minute standing ovation. It was released on Apple TV+ on May 30, 2025, as both a standard 2D film and an Apple Immersive Video for the Apple Vision Pro headset, making it the first feature-length film to be released in the format. Preceding the film's release, an abridged version of Bono's memoir that follows the narrative arc of the film was released in paperback, also under the title Bono: Stories of Surrender. An EP of the same name with live performances of three songs accompanied the film's release on May 30.

== Apple Vision Pro version ==
Bono: Stories of Surrender (Immersive) is a special edition of the film available as an Apple Immersive Video on the Apple Vision Pro, in a media format recorded in an 8K resolution with spatial audio. It is the first feature-length film available in the format. The immersive version of the film offers 180-degree video that places viewers on stage with Bono as he tells his story. It was creative directed by Elad Offer of the Artery, the New York-based creative studio.

== Reception ==
On the review aggregator website Rotten Tomatoes, 77% of 47 critics' reviews are positive, with an average rating of 6.3/10. The website's consensus reads: "Director Andrew Dominik paints Bono: Stories of Surrender with a deft touch, while leaving the heavy lifting of baring all to the man himself." Metacritic, which uses a weighted average, assigned the film a score of 59 out of 100, based on 15 critics, indicating "mixed or average" reviews.

Steve Pond of TheWrap wrote, "It's bombastic, extravagant and melodramatic at times – but I don't use those words as pejoratives, because in the hands of Bono and Dominik, it's also pretty glorious, a mashup of Bono's life and U2's music that refuses to be contained by the usual boundaries of an author's tour or a one-man show." Frank Scheck of The Hollywood Reporter wrote, "The musical interludes — which include gorgeous versions of such songs as 'Sunday Bloody Sunday', 'Where the Streets Have No Name', 'Vertigo', 'Desire' and 'Beautiful Day', among others — provide a welcome contrast to the film's inevitable talkiness. Ditto the kinetic cinematography and editing, which give the proceedings an arresting cinematic quality."

Luke Buckmaster of The VR Critic wrote of the immersive version: "A crazy, eye-popping, fully dimensional dream, filling the space between me and the screen, and the stage and performer." Sigmund Judge of MacStories wrote: "the creative team behind Bono: Stories of Surrender (Immersive) has essentially skipped a step by showing off another use case for Apple Immersive Video, one with the potential to elevate new creations from indie filmmakers who have limited access to immersive cameras and established studios looking to add some flair to their fan-favorite films and properties."

=== Accolades ===
For the 77th Primetime Creative Arts Emmy Awards, several members of the film's production team were nominated in the Outstanding Technical Direction and Camerawork for a Special category (Erik Messerschmidt, Mark Goellnicht, Brian S. Osmond, Vince Vennitti, Charles Libin, Christine Kapo Ng, Richard Rutkowski, and Luke McCoubrey). At the 10th Critics' Choice Documentary Awards, the film was nominated for Best Music Documentary. For the 16th Hollywood Music in Media Awards, Dominik was nominated in the Music Documentary – Special Program category as the film's director, while Bono's performance of "Sunday Bloody Sunday" was nominated in the Song – Onscreen Performance (Film) category.
