= Annie Lee Cooper =

African-American civil rights activist (1910–2010)

Annie Lee Wilkerson Cooper
- Born: Annie Lee Wilkerson; June 2, 1910; Selma, Alabama, US
- Died: November 24, 2010 (aged 100); Selma, Alabama, US
- Occupation: Civil rights activist
- Known for: Selma to Montgomery marches

Annie Lee Wilkerson Cooper (born Annie Lee Wilkerson; June 2, 1910 – November 24, 2010) was an American civil rights activist. She is best known for punching Dallas County, Alabama Sheriff Jim Clark in the face during the 1965 Selma to Montgomery marches. Cooper's lasting legacy is recognized as her activism in the Selma voting rights marches and her role as a female leader in the civil rights movement.

== Life and work ==
Annie Lee Wilkerson Cooper was born on June 2, 1910, as Annie Lee Wilkerson in Selma, Alabama as one of ten children of Lucy Jones and Charles Wilkerson Sr. When Cooper was in the seventh grade, she dropped out of school and moved to Kentucky to live with one of her older sisters, but later obtained a high school diploma. At an early age, Cooper joined the local Baptist church.

In the 1940s, Cooper owned a restaurant in Pennsylvania. A white man who wanted to lease part of Cooper's building asked that she segregate her seating, but she refused and revoked the sublease. Her restaurant was amongst the only in town that were non-discriminatory, leading to her disapproval to sanction it based on race.

In 1962, Cooper returned to Selma to care for her sick mother. She later attempted to vote in Selma, but was told she failed the literacy test. Upon being denied to register to vote in Alabama, Cooper began to participate in the civil rights movement. Cooper's attempt to register to vote in 1963 and her encouragement of her colleagues to also register, resulted in her being fired from her job as a nurse at a rest home. She then worked as a clerk at the Torch Motel after a very difficult search because of her affiliation to the Montgomery March.

Annie Lee Cooper was one of the few people in Selma who became fed up with the restrictions placed on the voting rights of African Americans and was willing to do something about it. Attempting to vote five times, she was one of the few who was brave enough to hold their own against the consequences that came with their attempts to vote. She lived in Kentucky, Pennsylvania, and Ohio before her incident with Jim Clark arose in Selma where voting rights were still being restricted. Jim Clark, a local sheriff, was confronted by Cooper when she tried to defend a man who was attempting to register from being kicked by the police. Even though she retaliated with violence while being a part of a non-violent organization, her act later was seen as having a true "Selma Spirit."

=== Incident with Jim Clark ===
I try to be nonviolent, but I just can't say I wouldn't do the same thing all over again if they treat me brutish like they did this time.

— Annie Lee Cooper

On January 25, 1965, Cooper went to the former Dallas County Courthouse in Selma, Alabama to register to vote as part of the Selma to Montgomery marches. While in line, Cooper was prodded by local sheriff Jim Clark with a baton. Cooper turned around and hit Clark in the face, knocking him to the ground. Cooper proceeded to jump on Clark until she was pulled away by other sheriffs.

Cooper was then arrested and charged with criminal provocation. She was held in jail for 11 hours before the sheriff's deputies dropped the charges and released her, hastened to protect her from being attacked by Clark upon his return to prison. Cooper spent the period of her incarceration singing spirituals. Some in the sheriff's department wanted to charge her with attempted murder, and she was let go. Following this incident, Cooper became a registered voter in Alabama.

Annie Lee Cooper played a monumental role in the lead up to the Voting Rights Act of 1965. After her incident with Jim Clark, she was immediately recognized for her courage. Black people throughout Selma celebrated Cooper's ability to advocate for herself and fight for her vote. Her incident, as well as Bloody Sunday, which occurred six weeks after Cooper's encounter with Clark, were critical steps in passing the Voting Rights Act of 1965, which created mechanisms to prevent racial voter suppression.

Though considered a key player in the voting rights movement, her efforts were often relegated to the background because of her gender. She was very misrepresented in the media, especially newspapers, who often presented her as an "aggressor." Some popular headlines in newspapers such as the Lodi News Sentinel would be "Selma Sheriff Slugged by Hefty Negro Woman."

=== Later years ===
On June 2, 2010, Annie Lee Cooper became a centenarian. Reflecting on her longevity, she stated, "My mother lived to be 106, so maybe I can live that long, too." On November 24, 2010, Cooper died of natural causes in the Vaughan Regional Medical Center in Selma, Alabama.

== In popular culture ==
In modern media, such as the 2014 film Selma, more light is shone on Annie Lee Cooper and her influential role as a woman during the civil rights movement. In contrast to media that has been published in the past about Cooper, which displays her as the initial attacker of Jim Clark, this film works to accurately depict her legacy and displays her as a hero and promoter of equality. This film offers an alternative perspective of her encounter with Clark and serves to better reflect Cooper and her fight for voting rights in the midst of the civil rights movement. In the film, Cooper was portrayed by Oprah Winfrey. Winfrey said that she took the role "because of the magnificence of Annie Lee Cooper and what her courage meant to an entire movement."

In the movie, Annie Lee Cooper is shown to be a key player in the civil rights movement but was still not able to capture her full experience with the movement. Even though she had representation in the film, it did not shed light on the issues she was trying to solve with the movement but mostly her incident with Jim Clark. The film also highlighted not only the struggles and success of Annie Lee Cooper, but of other Black women such as Coretta Scott King, Diane Nash and Amelia Boynton Robinson who played very important roles in the civil rights movement.

A street near Cooper's home was renamed in her honor.
