= Olmo (film) =

2025 United States drama film by Fernando Eimbcke

- Theatrical release poster
- Directed by: Fernando Eimbcke
- Screenplay by: Fernando Eimbcke; Vanesa Garnica
- Produced by: Dede Gardner; Jeremy Kleiner; Eréndira Núñez Larios; Michel Franco
- Starring: Gustavo Sánchez Parra; Aivan Uttapa; Diego Olmedo; Andrea Suárez Paz; Rosa Armendariz
- Cinematography: Carolina Costa
- Edited by: Mariana Rodríguez
- Music by: Giosuè Greco
- Production companies: Plan B Entertainment; Teorema
- Distributed by: Greenwich Entertainment
- Release dates: February 16, 2025 (Berlinale); August 7, 2026 (United States)
- Running time: 84 minutes
- Countries: United States; Mexico
- Languages: English; Spanish
- Box office: $64,116

Olmo is a 2025 drama film written and directed by Fernando Eimbcke. The film, set in 1970s New Mexico, stars Aivan Uttapa in the titular role of a 14-year-old boy named Olmo, who is stuck at home caring for his bedridden father. A co-production between the United States and Mexico, the film was selected in Panorama 2025 and premiered at the 75th Berlin International Film Festival on February 16, 2025. It was released in the United States on August 7, 2026, by Greenwich Entertainment.

== Synopsis ==
Olmo centers on 14-year-old Olmo, who is tasked with caring for his bedridden father afflicted with Multiple sclerosis. However, his life takes an unexpected turn when his enchanting neighbor, Nina Sandoval, invites him to a party.

== Cast ==
- Gustavo Sánchez Parra as Nestor
- Aivan Uttapa as Olmo
- Melanie Frometa as Nina Sandoval
- Diego Olmedo as Miguel
- Andrea Suárez Paz as Cecilia
- Rosa Armendariz as Ana
- Valentín Mexico as Tio Julio
- Humberto Castro as Dishwasher

== Production ==
Plan B Entertainment, under the micro budget film finance initiative to produce and finance lower cost films, launched Olmo as its first film.

Filming began on July 12, 2023 in the United States in New York and Jersey City.

Olmo produced by Dede Gardner, Jeremy Kleiner, and Eréndira Núñez Larios and directed by Fernando Eimbcke, featuring Gustavo Sánchez Parra and Andrea Suarez Paz wrapped up filming in and around Las Cruces, New Mexico in November 2023.

== Release ==
Olmo had its World premiere in the Panorama section of the 75th Berlin International Film Festival on February 16, 2025.

The film featured at the 72nd Sydney Film Festival in the Features section on June 4, 2025. It will be screened in Centrepiece section of the 2025 Toronto International Film Festival on 5 September 2025.

The film was presented in the Latin Horizons section at the 73rd San Sebastián International Film Festival on September 24, 2025, and in 'Strands: Laugh' section of the 2025 BFI London Film Festival on 14 October 2025.

In May 2026, Greenwich Entertainment acquired distribution rights to the film and set it for an August 7, 2026, release.

In the late August 2026, it will be showcased at the Norwegian International Film Festival in Young Movie section.

== Accolades ==
| Award | Date | Category | Recipient | Result | Ref. |
|---|---|---|---|---|---|
| Berlin International Film Festival | 23 February 2025 | Panorama Audience Award for Best Feature Film | Fernando Eimbcke | Nominated | |
| Deauville American Film Festival | | Jury Award | Olmo | Won (Note: Tied with Omaha.) | |
