= Paul Webb (screenwriter) =

British screenwriter and playwright (born 1947 or 1948)

Paul Webb (born 1947 or 1948) is a British screenwriter and playwright. Following careers as a teacher in Reading, Berkshire, and as a consultant in the petrochemical industry, he later moved into writing. He is known for writing the screenplay of the 2014 film Selma. For his work in Selma, Webb won the Central Ohio Film Critics Association Award for Best Original Screenplay. Webb was also nominated for the Satellite Award for Best Original Screenplay for his work in Selma, which he lost to Dan Gilroy for Nightcrawler. In addition to Selma, Webb also served as one of the writers for the 2017 BET miniseries Madiba.

Webb also wrote a play about the assassination of Thomas Becket titled Four Knights in Knaresborough, which was staged in London in 1999. Among Webb's unrealized projects include a film adaptation of Four Knights (optioned by Harvey Weinstein), a film adaptation of the novel Spanish Assassins and an unused screenplay draft of Lincoln (2012). Webb also wrote an epic-type screenplay for Michael Mann about the Russian oligarchs.
