= Pretty/Handsome =

- Genre: Drama
- Created by: Ryan Murphy
- Written by: Ryan Murphy; Brad Falchuk
- Directed by: Ryan Murphy
- Starring: Joseph Fiennes; Blythe Danner; Robert Wagner; Carrie-Anne Moss
- Country of origin: United States
- Original language: English

Production
- Executive producers: Brad Falchuk; Dede Gardner; Ryan Murphy; Brad Pitt
- Producers: Dante Di Loreto; Dede Gardner; Patrick McKee
- Editor: Bradley Buecker

Pretty/Handsome is a 2008 television pilot by Ryan Murphy that was not picked up to series by FX. According to Vogue, Murphy "was devastated when the studio he was working with decided not to pursue the show because they felt their advertisers wouldn’t support it".

== Plot ==
Bob, a married person with two sons, has to come out to her family as a transgender woman.

== Cast ==
- Joseph Fiennes as Bob Fitzpayne
- David Lambert as young Bob Fitzpayne
- Blythe Danner as Bunny Fitzpayne, Bob's mother
- Robert Wagner as Scotch Fitzpayne, Bob's father
- Carrie-Anne Moss as Elizabeth 'Liz' Fitzpayne
- Jake Cherry as Oliver Fitzpayne
- Jonathan Groff as Patrick Fitzpayne
- Jessica Lowndes as Cassie Boothe
- Christopher Egan as Beckett
- Sarah Paulson as Corky Fromme

== Production ==
The project began shooting in the end of October 2007. The original title of the project was 4 oz., but was later changed to Pretty/Handsome. FX did not pick the show to be a regular series. After Pretty/Handsome, Murphy worked on Glee because he "wanted to develop a wholesome comedy that the entire family can watch".
