= Albert J. Lingo =

American politician

- Born: January 22, 1910; Clayton, Alabama
- Died: August 17, 1969 (aged 59); Birmingham, Alabama
- Occupation: Alabama Highway Patrolman
- Known for: Director of the Alabama Department of Public Safety 1963-1965

Albert J. Lingo (January 22, 1910 – August 19, 1969) was appointed in 1963 by Alabama Gov. George Wallace to head the Alabama Highway Patrol, which he led until 1965 during turbulent years marked by marches and demonstrations that characterized the Civil Rights Movement in the U.S. South.

== Career ==
According to historian Dan T. Carter, Lingo had limited experience in law enforcement, but "had a reputation indispensable for Wallace .... He was known as 'hell on niggers' and a man who seemed to relish confrontation." His anger was not limited to Blacks and "his own recruits learned to stay out of his path; and was widely seen as a Klan-sympathizer. Lingo was described by The New York Times editorial page editor Howell Raines as "an addled racist" who derailed the state of Alabama's investigation into the 16th Street Baptist Church bombing due to either incompetence or in order to protect Robert Chambliss.

Lingo played a central role in Wallace's attempt to thwart racial peace during the Birmingham campaign. When white business leaders in Birmingham and civil rights leaders announced a desegregation accord on May 7, 1963, Lingo almost immediately ordered state troopers to cease their work with municipal officers to keep the peace on city streets, despite law enforcement intelligence that there was a plan to dynamite the hotel where the Rev. Martin Luther King Jr. was staying. After the motel and the home of King's brother were bombed on May 12, 1963, authorities and civil rights leaders at first struggled to control conflict in the streets. As order was on the verge of being restored, Lingo, under the orders of Wallace, returned to the city with state troopers and about 100 civilians armed with hunting rifles who had been mustered by Wallace from Selma. Lingo ignored the pleas of Birmingham police chief Jamie Moore to leave the city, instead setting his subordinates loose in the city in what federal officials concluded was a deliberate effort by Wallace to provoke incidents that the race-baiting governor, who in his January 1963 inauguration had promised "segregation forever," could use to justify further repression. Ultimately, King and other civil rights leaders were able to calm the streets through their own efforts.

Also in May 1963, Lingo led troopers in confronting civil rights marchers who were protesting the murder of William L. Moore, who was killed while protesting segregation. The troopers used an electric cattle prod on the protesters.

Lingo is also linked to the racist violence that accompanied the Selma to Montgomery marches. He led troopers who beat protesters on the Edmund Pettus Bridge in Selma on March 7, 1965, in what would become known as Bloody Sunday. He later claimed that he had "argued for two days" in favor of allowing the march, but was overruled "by my superior," presumably Wallace. "I was made the scapegoat," he said.

He ran an intelligence operation that used police power to compile dossiers on civil rights workers. The operation was used to intimidate, blackmail or otherwise discredit several Black applicants who would have desegregated the University of Alabama, but failed when investigators, acting on the orders of Wallace, could find nothing useful in the history or family backgrounds of Vivian Malone and James Hood.

He resigned as director effective October 1, 1965, and later ran for election to be sheriff of Jefferson County, Alabama, but was defeated.

Lingo died of heart disease at age 59 on August 17, 1969.
