= Jeremy Kleiner =

American film producer

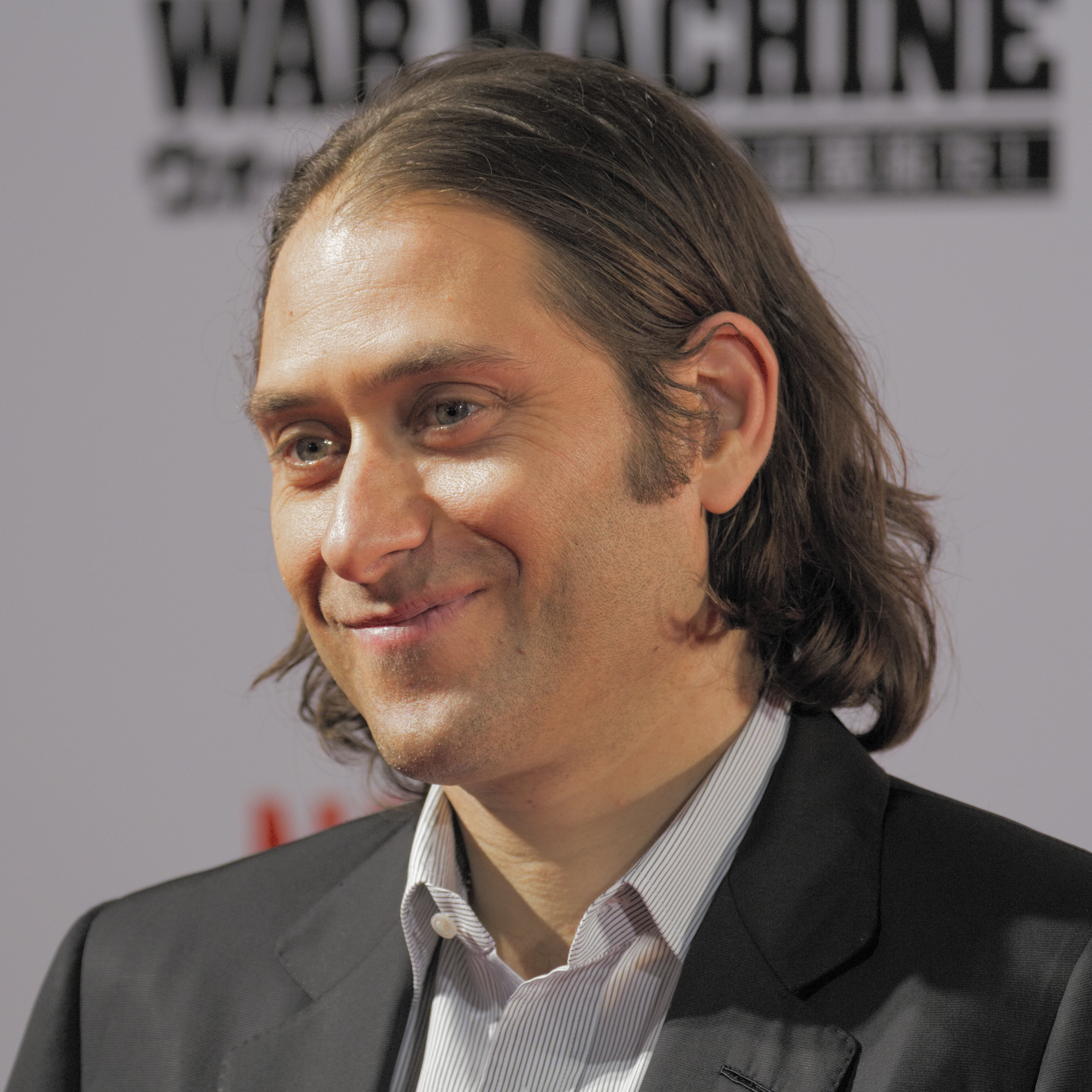
- Kleiner in May 2017
- Born: 1976 (age 49–50)
- Occupation: Film producer
- Years active: 2000–present

Jeremy Kleiner (born 1976) is an American film producer. Since 2013, he has served as the co-president of Plan B Entertainment with Dede Gardner. He was nominated for the Academy Award for Best Picture for four consecutive years for producing 12 Years a Slave (2013), Selma (2014), The Big Short (2015), and Moonlight (2016), winning for 12 Years a Slave and Moonlight. He earned his fifth nomination for Vice (2018).

== Early life ==
Kleiner was born into a Jewish family in 1976. He attended Harvard University, where he won the Detur Book Prize, the Thomas T. Hoopes Prize, and was elected Phi Beta Kappa before graduating in 1998. The Harvard Crimson wrote of Kleiner's thesis that "in the world of Hoopes Prize winners, one thesis surpasses all others with 192 pages of pure writing," noting in 199 that Kleiner was "on the rise in L.A., on the way to becoming a big-shot," while his advisor Patrice Higonnet called Kleiner "one of the most gifted undergraduates I have seen in my thirty-odd years as an instructor in our university."

== Career ==
Kleiner worked as a creative executive at The Donners' Company. In 2003, he joined Plan B Entertainment, working his way up from a creative executive to producer. Since 2013, he has served as the co-president of Plan B Entertainment with Dede Gardner. He was nominated for the Academy Award for Best Picture for four consecutive years for producing 12 Years a Slave (2013), Selma (2014), The Big Short (2015), and Moonlight (2016), winning for 12 Years a Slave and Moonlight. He earned his fifth nomination for Vice (2018).

== Filmography ==
=== Film ===
Year	Title	Role
2009	The Private Lives of Pippa Lee	Executive producer
2010	Kick-Ass	Executive producer
2010	Eat Pray Love	Executive producer
2013	World War Z	Producer
2013	12 Years a Slave	Producer
2014	Nightingale	Executive producer
2014	Selma	Producer
2015	True Story	Producer
2015	The Big Short	Producer
2016	Moonlight	Producer
2016	Frank & Lola	Special thanks
2016	The Tiger Hunter	Thanks
2016	The Lost City of Z	Producer
2017	Okja	Producer
2017	War Machine	Producer
2017	Brad's Status	Producer
2017	Marrowbone	Thanks
2018	Beautiful Boy	Producer
2018	If Beale Street Could Talk	Producer
2018	Vice	Producer
2019	The Last Black Man in San Francisco	Producer
2019	Ad Astra	Producer
2019	The King	Producer
2020	Kajillionaire	Producer
2020	Minari	Producer
2020	Irresistible	Producer
2022	Father of the Bride	Producer
2022	Women Talking	Producer
2022	Blonde	Producer
2022	Flight/Risk	Executive producer
2022	She Said	Producer
2023	Landscape with Invisible Hand	Producer
2024	Bob Marley: One Love	Producer
2024	Beetlejuice Beetlejuice	Producer
2024	Apocalypse in the Tropics	Executive producer
2024	Wolfs	Producer
2024	Nickel Boys	Producer
2025	Mickey 17	Producer
2025	Olmo	Producer
2025	Bono: Stories of Surrender	Producer
2025	F1	Producer
2025	Preparation for the Next Life	Producer
2025	Hedda	Producer
2026	Teenage Sex and Death at Camp Miasma	Producer
TBA	The Tiger	Producer
TBA	Wizards!	Producer
TBA	Wrong Answer	Producer
TBA	Weekend Warriors	Producer

=== Television ===
Year	Title	Role
2014	Deadbeat	Executive producer
2014−2015	Resurrection	Executive producer
2017	Monsters of God	Executive producer
2016−2019	The OA	Executive producer
2018−2019	Sweetbitter	Executive producer
2020	The Third Day: Autumn	Executive producer
2020	The Third Day	Executive producer
2021	The Underground Railroad	Executive producer
2020−2021	Lego Masters	Executive producer
2022	Outer Range	Executive producer
2022	Paper Girls	Executive producer
2022	High School	Executive producer
2024	3 Body Problem	Executive producer
2025	Adolescence	Executive producer
TBA	Wytches	Executive producer

== Awards and nominations ==
=== Academy Awards ===
Year	Category	Nominated work	Result	Ref.
2013	Best Picture	12 Years a Slave	Won	
2014	Best Picture	Selma	Nominated	
2015	Best Picture	The Big Short	Nominated	
2016	Best Picture	Moonlight	Won	
2018	Best Picture	Vice	Nominated	
2022	Best Picture	Women Talking	Nominated	
2024	Best Picture	Nickel Boys	Nominated	
2025	Best Picture	F1	Nominated	

=== AACTA International Awards ===
Year	Category	Nominated work	Result	Ref.
2013	Best Film	12 Years a Slave	Nominated	
2015	Best Film	The Big Short	Nominated	

=== AFI Awards ===
Year	Category	Nominated work	Result	Ref.
2013	Top 10 Films	12 Years a Slave	Won	
2014	Top 10 Films	Selma	Won	
2015	Top 10 Films	The Big Short	Won	
2016	Top 10 Films	Moonlight	Won	

=== Alliance of Women Film Journalists ===
Year	Category	Nominated work	Result	Ref.
2013	Best Picture	12 Years a Slave	Won	
2014	Best Picture	Selma	Nominated	

=== American Black Film Festival ===
Year	Category	Nominated work	Result	Ref.
2013	Movie of the Year	12 Years a Slave	Nominated	

=== Awards Circuit Community Awards ===
Year	Category	Nominated work	Result	Ref.
2013	Best Motion Picture	12 Years a Slave	Nominated	
2014	Best Motion Picture	Selma	Nominated	

=== Black Reel Awards ===
Year	Category	Nominated work	Result	Ref.
2013	Best Film	12 Years a Slave	Won	
2014	Best Film	Selma	Won	
2016	Best Film	Moonlight	Won	

=== British Academy Film Awards ===
Year	Category	Nominated work	Result	Ref.
2013	Best Film	12 Years a Slave	Won	
2015	Best Film	The Big Short	Nominated	
2016	Best Film	Moonlight	Nominated	
2025	Outstanding British Film	H Is for Hawk	Nominated	

=== British Academy Television Awards ===
Year	Category	Nominated work	Result	Ref.
2022	Best International Programme	The Underground Railroad	Won	

=== CinEuphoria Awards ===
Year	Category	Nominated work	Result	Ref.
2013	Best International Film	12 Years a Slave	Nominated	

=== Golden Raspberry Awards ===
Year	Category	Nominated work	Result	Ref.
2022	Worst Picture	Blonde	Won	

=== Gotham Awards ===
Year	Category	Nominated work	Result	Ref.
2013	Best Feature	12 Years a Slave	Nominated	
2013	Audience Award	12 Years a Slave	Nominated	
2014	Best Feature	Nickel Boys	Nominated	

=== Independent Spirit Awards ===
Year	Category	Nominated work	Result	Ref.
2013	Best Film	12 Years a Slave	Won	
2014	Best Film	Selma	Nominated	
2024	Best Film	Nickel Boys	Nominated	

=== Italian Online Movie Awards ===
Year	Category	Nominated work	Result	Ref.
2013	Best Picture	12 Years a Slave	Nominated	

=== Online Film & Television Association Awards ===
Year	Category	Nominated work	Result	Ref.
2013	Best Picture	12 Years a Slave	Won	
2014	Best Picture	Selma	Nominated	
2015	Best Picture	The Big Short	Nominated	

=== Primetime Emmy Awards ===
Year	Category	Nominated work	Result	Ref.
2015	Outstanding Television Movie	Nightingale	Nominated	
2021	Outstanding Limited or Anthology Series	The Underground Railroad	Nominated	
2024	Outstanding Drama Series	3 Body Problem	Nominated	
2025	Outstanding Limited or Anthology Series	Adolescence	Won	

=== Producers Guild of America Awards ===
Year	Category	Nominated work	Result	Ref.
2013	Best Theatrical Motion Picture	12 Years a Slave	Won (Note: Tied with Alfonso Cuarón and David Heyman for Gravity.)	
2014	Visionary Award		Won	
2015	Best Theatrical Motion Picture	The Big Short	Won	
2016	Best Theatrical Motion Picture	Moonlight	Nominated	
2018	Best Theatrical Motion Picture	Vice	Nominated	
2020	David O. Selznick Award		Won	
