= Christian Colson =

British film producer

- Born: 15 September 1968 (age 57); Buenos Aires, Argentina
- Education: Claires Court School 1975–1981
- Occupation: Producer
- Years active: 2005–present

Christian Patrick Colson (born 15 September 1968) is a British film producer. He is best known as the producer of the 2008 film Slumdog Millionaire, for which he received numerous awards including the Academy Award for Best Picture, Golden Globe Award for Best Motion Picture – Drama, and BAFTA Award for Best Film. In 2014, both Danny Boyle and Christian Colson signed a first look deal with FX Productions.

== Filmography ==
=== Producer ===
- The Descent (2005)
- Separate Lies (2005)
- Eden Lake (2008)
- Slumdog Millionaire (2008)
- The Descent Part 2 (2009)
- Centurion (2010)
- 127 Hours (2010)
- Trance (2013)
- Selma (2014)
- Steve Jobs (2015)
- Trainspotting 2 (2017)
