= Roy Reed =

American journalist

- Born: February 14, 1930; Hot Springs, Arkansas, U.S.
- Died: December 10, 2017 (aged 87); Fayetteville, Arkansas, U.S.
- Education: University of Missouri (MA)
- Occupation: Journalist
- Employer(s): Arkansas Gazette and New York Times
- Spouse: Norma Pendleton
- Parent(s): Roy Edward Reed and Ella Meredith Reed
- Awards: Porter Prize (2009)

Roy Reed (February 14, 1930 – December 10, 2017) was an American journalist. He wrote about the Civil Rights Movement for The New York Times. He was the author of several books, including Looking for Hogeye (1986); a biography of Governor Orval Faubus, Faubus: The Life and Times of an American Prodigal (1997); and Beware of Limbo Dancers: A Correspondent's Adventures with the New York Times (2012). He also edited Looking Back at the Arkansas Gazette: An Oral History (2009). After leaving The New York Times in 1979, he taught in the Journalism Department of the University of Arkansas, Fayetteville, serving as chairman from 1981 to 1982. After his retirement, the Journalism Department established the Roy Reed Lecture Series in his honor. Reed died of a stroke on December 10, 2017.
