= Bob Mants =

American civil rights activist (1943–2011)

- Born: Robert Mants; April 25, 1943; Atlanta, Georgia
- Died: December 7, 2011 (aged 68); Atlanta, Georgia
- Occupations: Civil rights activist; politician
- Years active: 1964–2011
- Known for: Field secretary for SNCC
- Spouse: Joann Christian
- Children: 3

Robert "Bob" Mants Jr. (April 25, 1943 – December 7, 2011) was an American civil rights activist, serving as a field secretary for the Student Nonviolent Coordinating Committee (SNCC). Mants moved to Lowndes County, working for civil rights for the remainder of his life. Lowndes County contained the majority of the distance covered by the 1965 Selma to Montgomery march, and was then notorious for its racist violence.

== Early life ==
Mants was born in Atlanta, Georgia. He graduated in 1961 from East Point/South Fulton High School, a segregated black high school. While he was attending high school, Mants was a member of the Committee on Appeal for Human Rights (which would later develop into the Atlanta Student Movement) and volunteering for administrative tasks at the headquarters of the Student Nonviolent Coordinating Committee, two blocks from his home. He would go on to attend Morehouse College with the intention of majoring in medicine, but left without graduating, working in 1964 with SNCC in Americus, Georgia. At the beginning of 1965, Mants moved to Lowndes County, AL for his job.

== Civil rights activism ==
While in Americus, Mants reported over the Wide Area Telephone Service that "negro and white" mobs were forming on the evening of July 6, 1964, possibly in response to riots the evening before or the integration of two downtown restaurants earlier in the day, which had occurred without incident. Mants was working to calm and disperse the mobs. An hour later, Mants reported a drive-by shooting with no reported injuries or deaths.

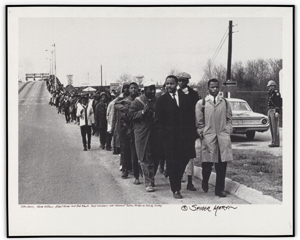
Photograph of John Lewis, Hosea William, Albert Turner and Bob Mants Leading Marchers over the Edmund Pettus Bridge on Bloody Sunday

Mants and Stokely Carmichael from the SNCC first arrived in Selma to participate in the 1965 Selma-to-Montgomery march; in photographs of Bloody Sunday taken by Spider Martin, Mants can be seen wearing a patterned cap, marching next to Albert Turner just behind John Lewis after crossing the Edmund Pettus Bridge; earlier that morning, Mants had participated in a prayer at the Brown Chapel A.M.E. Church, where the march originated, with John Lewis, Hosea Williams, and Andrew Young. During the violent suppression on Bloody Sunday, Mants saved a woman from a possible beating and took her away from the tear gas cloud.

While marching to Montgomery in late March 1965, Mants was passing out buttons and leaflets when a resident of Lowndes County, pleased the civil rights movement was coming to her, memorably quoted Revelation 7:9 to him. In 1964, Lowndes County had no registered black voters, even though the county's population was predominantly black. The county was known as "Bloody Lowndes" or the rusty buckle of the Black Belt of Alabama because of its long, violent history of whites retaliating against blacks who tried to register to vote. When Mants and other SNCC officials began to register black voters, the newly registered voters, many of which still lived on plantations, were made homeless by the predominantly white landowners. Many of the displaced black residents were housed in a temporary "Tent City" and subject to intimidation over the next two years as shots were regularly fired into the encampment. In response, SNCC set up the Alabama Poor People's Land Fund to purchase plots of land and building materials to help the displaced black residents to build new homes.

SNCC also tried a new strategy in Lowndes County, setting up the Lowndes County Freedom Organization (LCFO) in 1966 as an independent Black political party, adopting a snarling black panther as its logo. LCFO would in turn inspire other leaders, such as Stokely Carmichael, who adopted the structure of LCFO for Black Power, and Bobby Seale and Huey P. Newton, who adopted the black panther logo for the Black Panther Party.

Mants remained in Lowndes County after the march, saying "if there was any place I wanted to raise my kids, it would be here, because they could see black people moving forward, advancing ourselves as a race." Mants served as a farm management specialist at Tuskegee University. In 1984, Mants was elected to the Lowndes County Commission, unseating a white incumbent, and served one term.

In 2000, Mants opposed the creation of a landfill along U.S. Route 80, the highway taken by marchers in the third Selma to Montgomery march, calling it "an insult." As head of Lowndes County Friends of the Trail, he noted "you can't commemorate [the route of the march] on the one hand and desecrate it on the other."

Bob Mants died after a heart attack on December 7, 2011, while visiting Atlanta. A memorial service was held in Lowndes County on December 17, 2011, where several speakers praised him and his three children (Kadejah, Kumasi, and Katanga) expressed their appreciation for the honors bestowed to him. In addition to his three children, Mants is survived his wife, Joann Christian (also a noted civil rights activist) and seven grandchildren. Mants is also survived by three sisters (Dorothy, Roberta, Otelia).
