= Ellwanger =

Ellwanger is a surname. Notable people with the surname include:

- George Ellwanger (1816–1906), German-American horticulture scientist
- Joseph Ellwanger (born 1934), American Lutheran pastor, author, and civil rights activist
- Niels Ellwanger (born 1965), West German sprint canoer
