= Albert Turner (activist) =

American civil rights activist

- Born: February 29, 1936; Marion, Alabama
- Died: April 13, 2000 (aged 64); Selma, Alabama
- Occupations: Civil rights activist; politician
- Years active: 1962–2000
- Known for: field secretary for SCLC, leading Selma to Montgomery marches
- Spouse: Evelyn
- Children: 4 (3 sons, 1 daughter)

Albert Turner (February 29, 1936 – April 13, 2000) was an American civil rights activist and an advisor to Martin Luther King Jr. He was Alabama field secretary for the Southern Christian Leadership Conference and helped lead the voting rights march from Selma to Montgomery; and assisted others escape beating during the Bloody Sunday.

== Early life ==
Turner was born outside of Marion, Alabama, the son of a Perry County farmer; he was the fourth of 12 children. He graduated from Alabama A&M.

== Career ==
Albert Turner attempted to register to vote in 1962, but despite his college education, could not pass the literacy test given. That incident galvanized Turner to organize local voter registration efforts and educate prospective voters about the voter registration tests. Turner was one of the marchers credited with leading the Selma to Montgomery procession in March 1965 while Dr. King attended a ceremony honoring his work in Cleveland.

He served as State Director of the SCLC from 1965 to 1972. After the assassination of Dr. King, Turner led the mule train which bore his body to its final resting place. Turner attracted national attention in 1978 as the manager of the Southwest Alabama Farmers Cooperative Association, when he and an ex-moonshine distiller teamed up to cheaply produce ethanol for gasohol from corn mash.

=== Voting rights activism in Alabama ===
External videos
- “Eyes on the Prize; America, They Loved You Madly; Interview with Albert Turner” conducted in 1979 for America, They Loved You Madly, a precursor to the Eyes on the Prize documentary.

Traditionally, white voters in the Black Belt region of Alabama had taken advantage of absentee ballots to retain control of elected offices; even with the increased registration of black voters, white absentee nonresident voters would vote in local elections at the behest of resident relatives and friends. Wilcox County Commissioner Bobby Joe Johnson joked, "Do you know why the roads to white folks' cemeteries are paved in the Black Belt? It's so people won't get their feet wet if it rains on election day." Despite complaints of fraud, election officials failed to obtain any indictments for absentee voter fraud. When Turner went to Washington D.C. to complain about fraud to lawyers at the Justice Department, he was told the government "[couldn't] do anything ... Y'all need to learn to use the absentee-ballot process yourselves." Perry County and the other counties forming the Black Belt, initially named for its soil, are some Alabama's poorest counties, and residents of the Black Belt typically travel out of their home counties for work, making it difficult to vote at local polls, which were only open in Perry County for four hours in the afternoon. In addition, many potential black voters in the Black Belt are elderly and/or illiterate due to inferior education, again limiting poll access. As a result, local civil rights organizations, including the Perry County Civic League (PCCL), began to register black voters for and assist them with absentee ballots.

In 1979, Maggie Bozeman and Julia Wilder were convicted of absentee voter fraud in a 1978 election held in Pickens County. The verdict was reached by an all-white jury, and the pair were sentenced to four (Bozeman) and five (Wilder) years imprisonment, believed to be the strongest sentences handed out to-date for voting fraud in Alabama. The conviction was later upheld by the Alabama Supreme Court before being overturned in federal court, but the pair, known as the Carrollton Two, started to serve their sentences in January 1982 and were freed in November 1982 after spending 11 days in prison, with the balance of time served on work release in Tuskegee. The initial conviction, though, depressed black voter participation in Pickens County.

=== The Marion Three ===
State district attorney Roy Johnson convened a grand jury during the fall and winter of 1982–83 to investigate PCCL-led voter assistance programs and absentee ballots, but failed to obtain an indictment. Johnson took his suspicions to Assistant Attorney General William Bradford Reynolds, head of the Civil Rights Division of the Department of Justice in October 1982, asking Reynolds to deploy federal marshals to supervise elections, and Reynolds demurred, saying it was not possible under the Voting Rights Act. In the summer of 1984, US Justice Department officials promulgated a new policy to "investigate political participants who seek out the elderly, socially disadvantaged, or the illiterate, for the purpose of subjugating their electoral will," applying it in a selective manner against civil rights activists seeking to register black voters in the Black Belt.

At the time, Turner led the PCCL, and a rival group complained to the local district attorney that Turner and other PCCL officials were altering votes on absentee ballots. In the 1984 election, according to testimony from Jeff Sessions who was the United States Attorney for the Southern District of Alabama from 1981 and testified about the election at a Congressional hearing in 1986 to decide whether to confirm him as a U.S. district judge, out of 4,000 ballots total in Perry County, 729 were absentee ballots, which seemed like a disproportionately high number since more absentee ballots were cast in Perry than in Jefferson County, which had more than 45 times the number of residents of Perry County. At Sessions's suggestion, the FBI watched the Marion post office during the September 1984 primary election, where they saw the Turner, his wife Evelyn and Spencer Hogue Jr. drop off absentee ballots; election officials, under a court order, marked those envelopes and identified 75 altered ballots in the group of ballots dropped of by PCCL officials.

FBI agents took the marked ballots and confronted many of the voters with allegations of "ballot tampering." Of the eighteen counties counted as part of the Black Belt, the investigation concentrated on the five counties which had posted the largest gains in black elected officials. In a later interview, Evelyn Turner explained the alterations were performed at the request of the voters, assistance permitted by state law. Nevertheless the prosecution moved forward and Turner, his wife Evelyn, and Hogue, who became known as the Marion Three, were indicted on twenty-nine counts by a Mobile-based federal grand jury on January 25, 1985 based on allegations of ballot tampering in the September 4, 1984 primary election. The maximum punishment was 115 years in prison and $40,000 in fines.

Turner's brother Robert, a lawyer who was part of the defense team for the Marion Three, alleged in 2016 that Sessions had jailed the Marion Three to send a message: "You got a person like Albert Turner that's out front, spearheading all these voter registration drives, why not put him in jail and see how many people get scared?"

This whole FBI investigation of absentee voting and the scheduled trials were set up to stop the political progress of black people in the Alabama Black Belt. The power structure wants to turn back the hands of time in Perry County and throughout west Alabama. I would encourage black people not to let my indictment stop them or discourage them. We need to vote in even larger numbers because they are trying to take our right to vote away again.

— Albert Turner (1985), at his trial defense

The Marion Three were defended by a team of lawyers experienced in civil rights litigation, including Turner's brother Robert, J. L. Chestnut, Lani Guinier, James Liebman, Deval Patrick, and Hank Sanders. During the grand jury investigation in October 1984, more than two dozen subpoenaed witnesses, many of them black senior citizens familiar with segregation-era intimidation techniques, were bused more than 160 miles (260 km) to Mobile to be photographed, fingerprinted, provide handwriting samples, and testify before the federal grand jury. Grand jury records indicate that several of the questioned witnesses were so intimidated they would no longer vote in the future.

The case moved to trial on June 19, 1985. The federal jury deliberated for three hours before handing down "not guilty" verdicts for all three defendants on all charges on July 5, 1985. Turner renewed his contention that the trial was instigated by freshman Senator Jeremiah Denton (R-AL), who, Turner said, had the most to gain by intimidating black voters. Sessions later claimed that his team, which consisted of two lawyers, was understaffed and unprepared to tackle a "vigorous defense."

== Later life and legacy ==
Turner died on April 13, 2000, while being prepared for an operation to stop abdominal bleeding. His youngest son, Albert Turner Jr., was appointed to fill Turner Sr.'s seat on the Perry County Commission after Turner Sr.'s death. In January 2023, his son, Turner, Jr., was indicted for voter fraud charges.

A stretch of Perry County Road 45 south of Marion is named the Albert Turner Sr Memorial Highway. Perry County has also named an elementary school for Turner.
