= Mount Zion AME Zion Church (Montgomery, Alabama) =

Historic church in Montgomery, Alabama, US

- Mt. Zion AME Zion Church
- U.S. National Register of Historic Places
- Alabama Register of Landmarks and Heritage
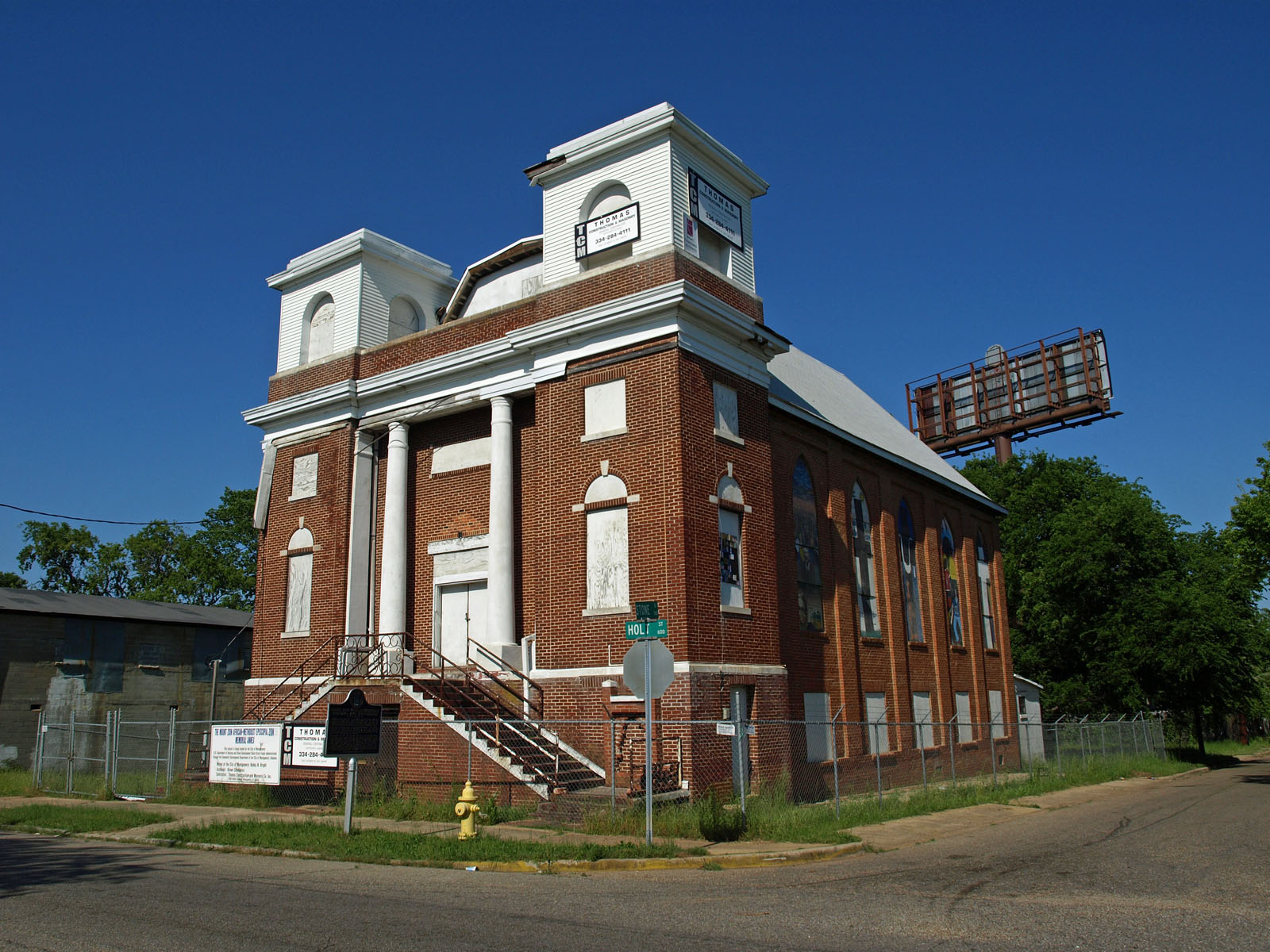
- Mt. Zion AME Zion Church in 2009.
- Location: 467 Holt St., Montgomery, Alabama
- Coordinates: 32°22′6″N 86°19′14″W
- Built: 1899
- Architectural style: Classical Revival
- NRHP reference No.: 02001066

Significant dates
- Added to NRHP: October 04, 2002
- Designated ARLH: June 30, 1995

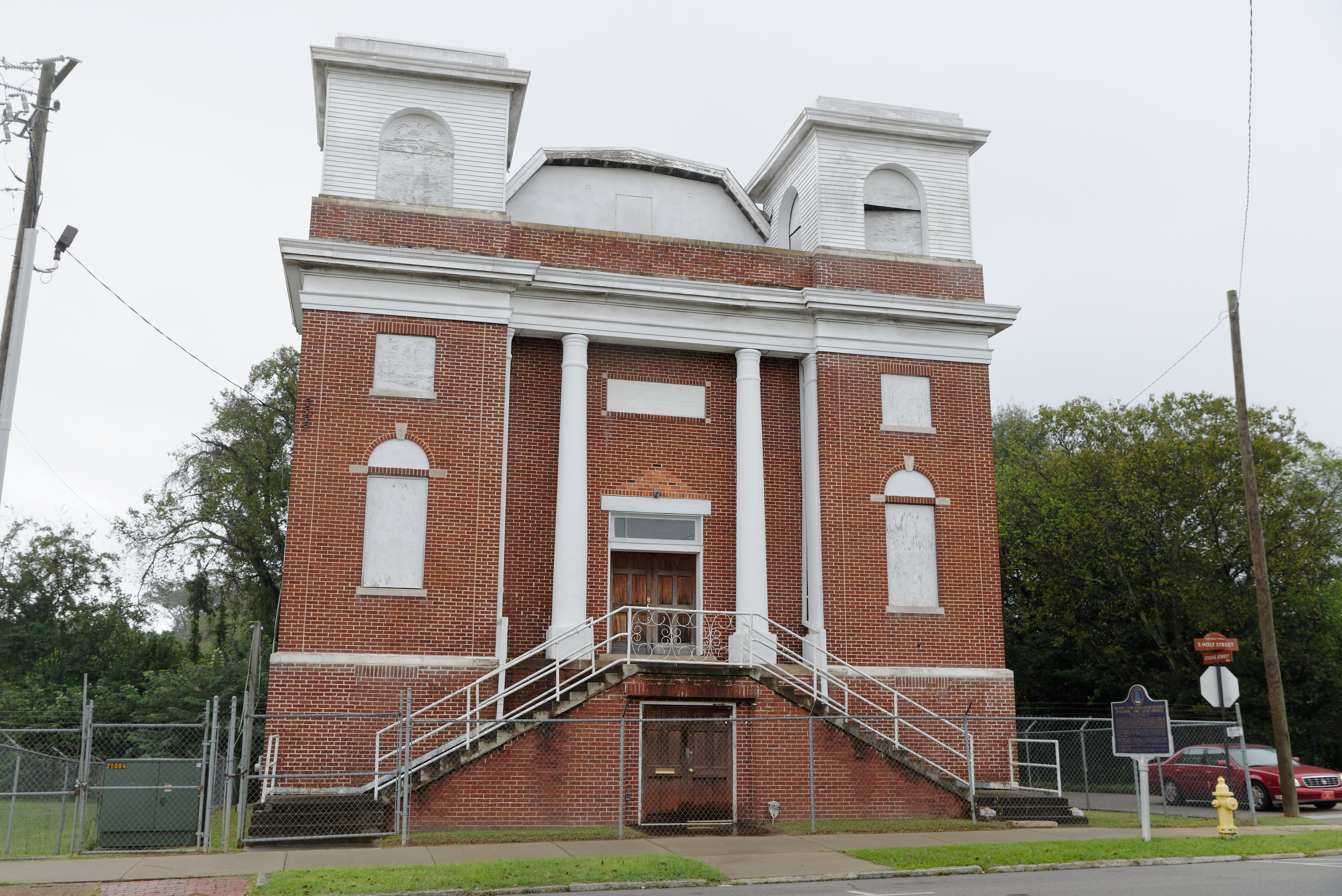
Front

The Mount Zion African Methodist Episcopal Zion Church, also known as the Mount Zion AME Zion Church Memorial Annex, is a historic church in Montgomery, Alabama, United States. It is located at 467 Holt Street. It was built in 1899 and extensively remodeled in 1921.

In 1955 the Montgomery Improvement Association, who organized the Montgomery bus boycott, was formed in the building. During the Selma to Montgomery marches in 1965, marchers rested at the church on their way to the Capitol. It is included on the Selma to Montgomery National Historic Trail. The congregation moved to a new location in 1990, and on November 4, 2002, the building was added to the U.S. National Register of Historic Places.

The sides of the building are decorated with murals depicting Martin Luther King Jr., Rosa Parks, and the Selma to Montgomery marches.
