= City of St. Jude =

- City of St. Jude Historic District
- U.S. National Register of Historic Places
- U.S. Historic district
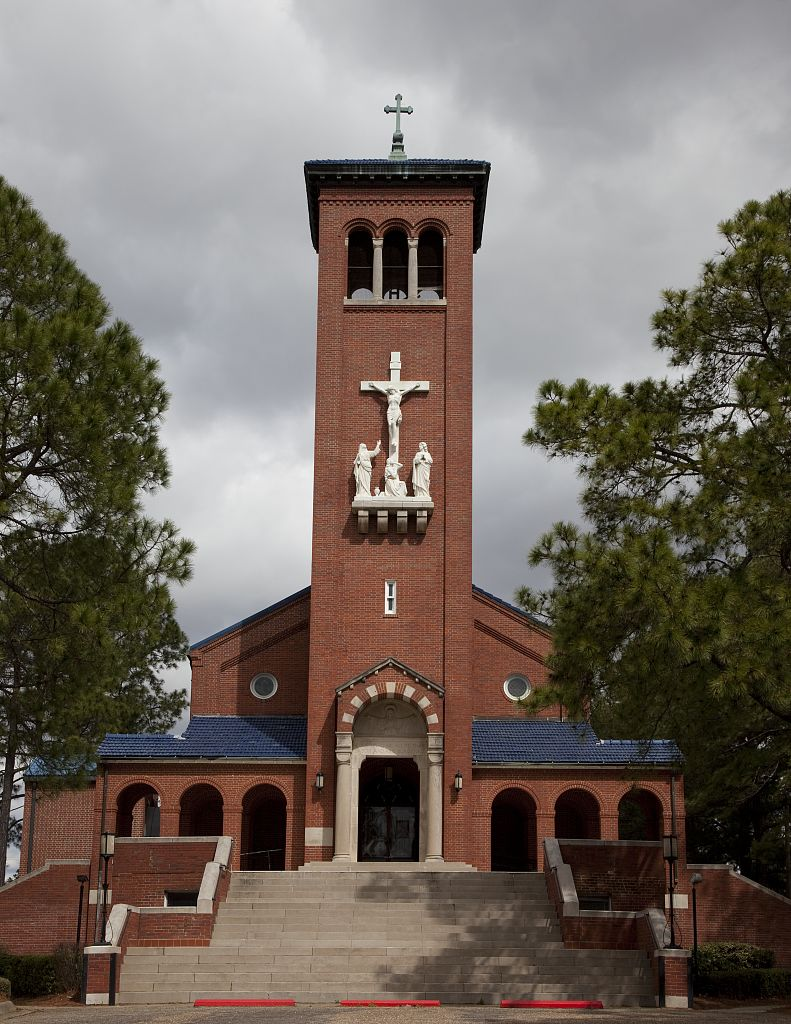
- St Jude Church (2010 photograph by Carol M. Highsmith)

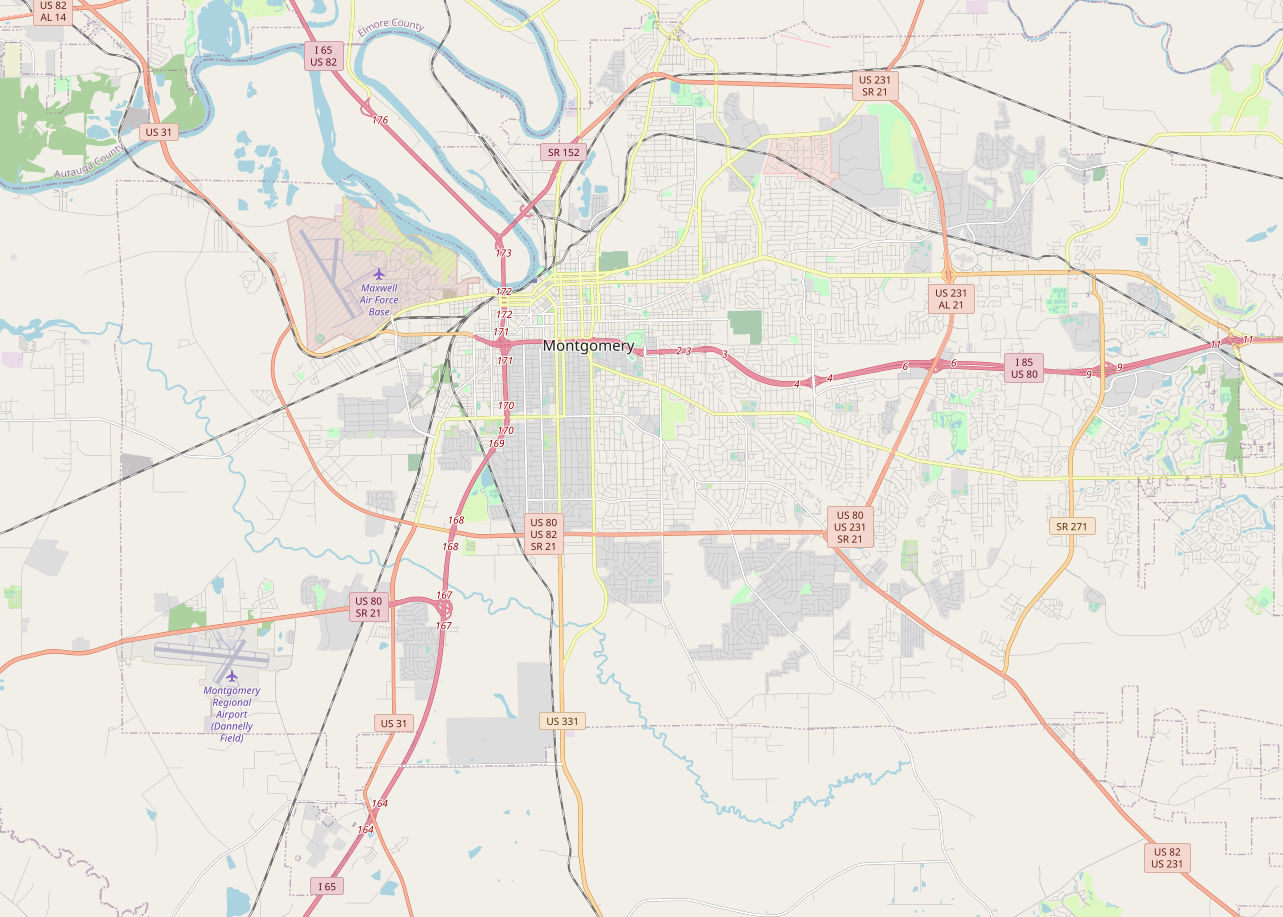
- Location within Montgomery, Alabama Location within Alabama Location within the United States
- Coordinates: 32.353°N 86.327°W
- Built: 1938
- Architect: William P. Callahan, Joseph C. Maschi
- Architectural style: Late 19th- and 20th-century Revivals, Italian Renaissance
- Website: cityofstjude.org
- NRHP reference No.: 90000916
- Added to NRHP: June 18, 1990

The City of St. Jude is a 36-acre (15 ha) campus in Montgomery, Alabama, hosting a high school, hospital, and Catholic church. It was founded in 1934 by Fr Harold Purcell with the aim of bringing "light, hope and dignity to the poor," regardless of race.

The campus hosted the Stars for Freedom rally on the night of March 24, 1965, where celebrities volunteered to entertain weary marchers on the final night of the Selma to Montgomery marches.

The campus was listed on the National Register of Historic Places in 1990, and is part of the Selma to Montgomery National Historic Trail, created in 1996.

== Campus ==
Father Purcell started the first Catholic ministry for African Americans in Alabama, opening a dispensary in a rented house on Holt Street in Montgomery starting on June 2, 1934. Purcell received funds from Bishop Thomas Joseph Toolen, head of the Diocese of Mobile in 1936 and purchased 56 acres (23 ha) between Hill and Oak Streets, soon afterwards building and dedicating a church at the site to Saint Jude the Apostle in 1938. By 1938, the City of St. Jude had already treated 8,000 unique patients.

=== Social center (1939–) ===
The social center was built soon after the church, in 1939. The City of St. Jude proposed that a "Campsite 4 Experience" Museum would be housed at the social center while raising funds to build an interpretive center.

=== School (1947–2014) ===
The first classes at the City of St. Jude were held in the basement of the 1938 church. St. Jude Educational Institute was not explicitly segregated, even though Bishop Toolen did not support integration, and early classes featured predominantly African American classes with some white students.

During the 25th anniversary of the Selma to Montgomery marches, former Alabama Governor George Wallace stood in the doorway of the St. Jude Educational Institute to welcome civil rights activists.

=== Hospital (1951–1985) ===
The St. Jude Catholic Hospital, which opened in 1951, was the first integrated hospital in the southeastern United States, and the first hospital in the region to admit all patients regardless of color or creed. It is also the birthplace of Dr. Martin Luther King Jr. and Coretta Scott King's two eldest children, Yolanda and Martin Luther III.

After being shot following the Selma to Montgomery march, activist Viola Liuzzo was taken to the hospital at St. Jude, where doctors unsuccessfully tried to save her life. Although the hospital closed in 1985, the building was converted to low-cost apartments in 1992.

== Stars for Freedom ==
During the final night of the Selma to Montgomery marches on March 24, 1965, an estimated 10,000 marchers camped on an athletic field in the St. Jude campus and watched the Stars for Freedom rally, featuring many celebrities. Performances were held on a makeshift stage consisting of empty coffin shipping crates topped by plywood sheets. The next morning, the crowd that marched from the City of St. Jude was estimated at 25,000, and the tail of the procession did not reach the Alabama State Capitol building until nearly ninety minutes after the leaders of the march.

The pastor of St. Jude asked Bishop Toolen for permission to allow the marchers to camp overnight, which was granted, but Toolen warned the pastor "there would be consequences." After the march, donations to the City of St. Jude decreased precipitously, since the primary contributors were white Catholics who "agreed with helping blacks, [but didn't] agree with Martin Luther King." Some of the hospital employees also resigned in the wake of the march, and white students left the school.

The following celebrities were present at Stars for Freedom:

- Joan Baez
- James Baldwin
- Ina Balin
- Harry Belafonte
- Tony Bennett
- Leonard Bernstein
- Sammy Davis Jr.
- Billy Eckstine
- Dick Gregory
- Lena Horne
- Mahalia Jackson
- Alan King
- Frankie Laine
- William Marshall
- Johnny Mathis
- Gary Merrill
- The Chad Mitchell Trio
- Odetta
- Peter, Paul and Mary
- Pernell Roberts
- Julius "Nipsey" Russell
- Pete Seeger
- Nina Simone
- Shelley Winters

== Legacy ==
In 2008, the National Park Service recommended Alabama State University over the City of St. Jude for the third Selma to Montgomery National Historic Trail interpretive center. In response, after a fundraising effort, the City of St. Jude opened its own interpretive center in 2015.

== Gallery ==
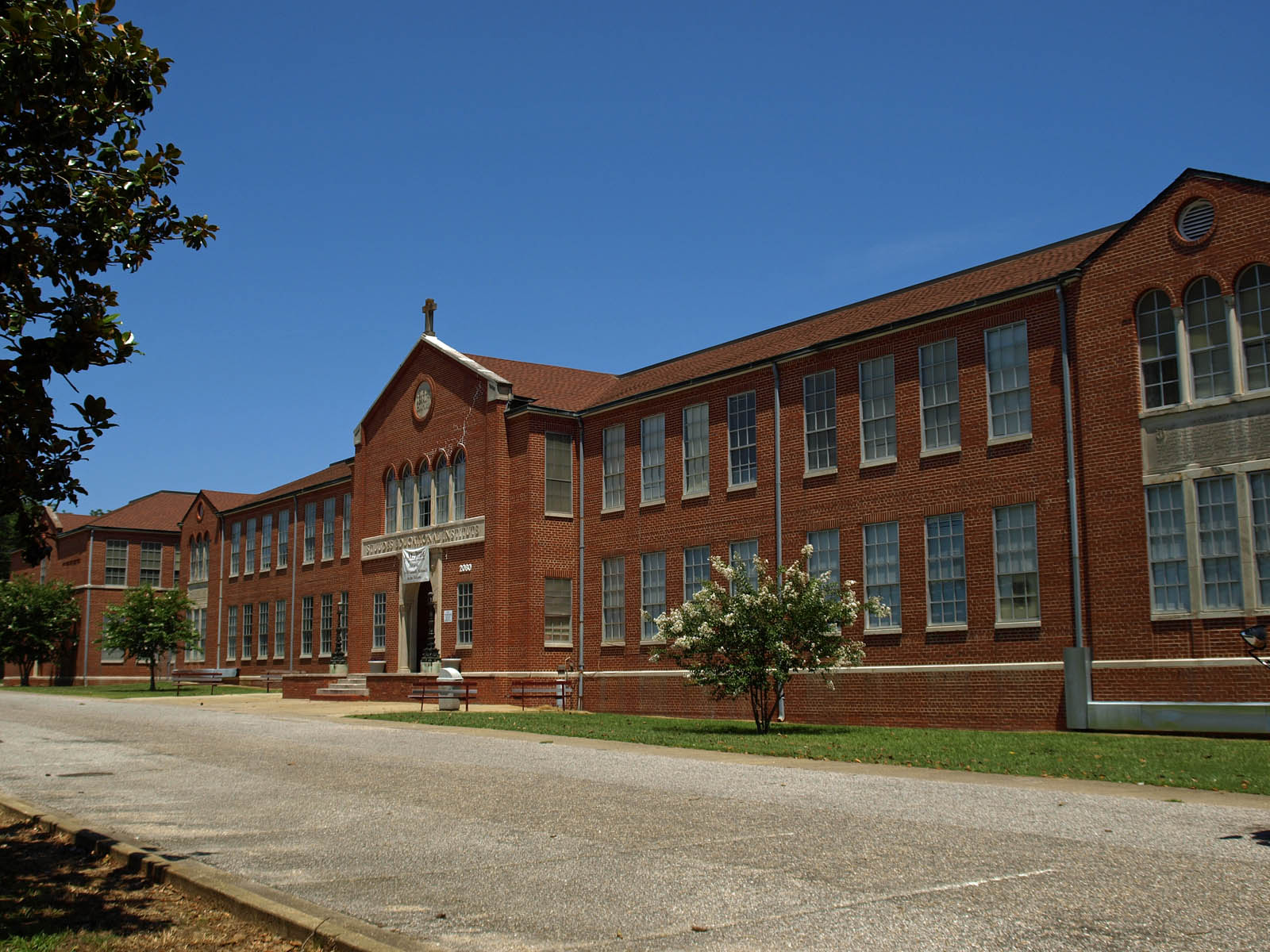
St. Jude Educational Institute (2009)

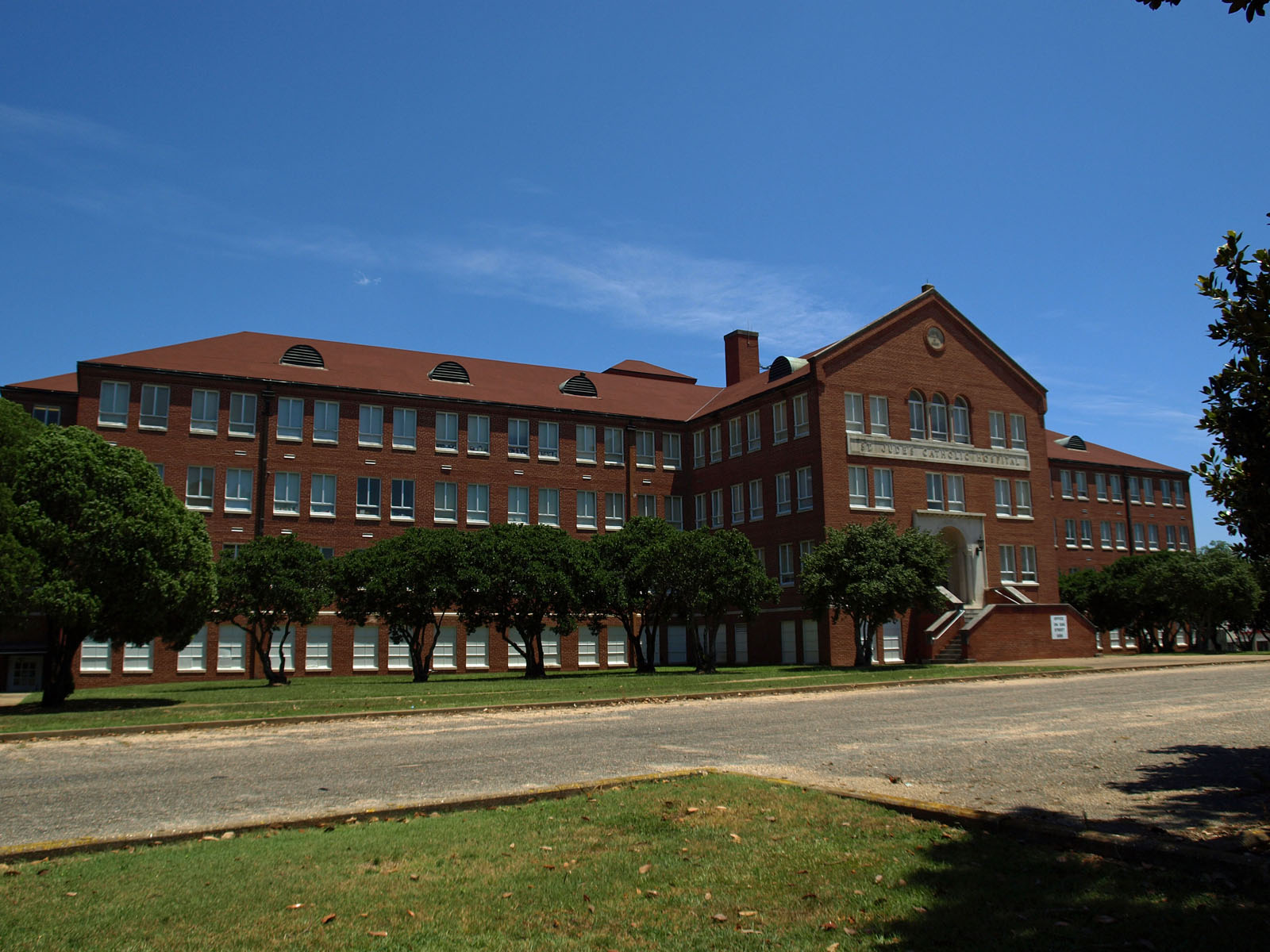
St. Jude's Catholic Hospital (2009)

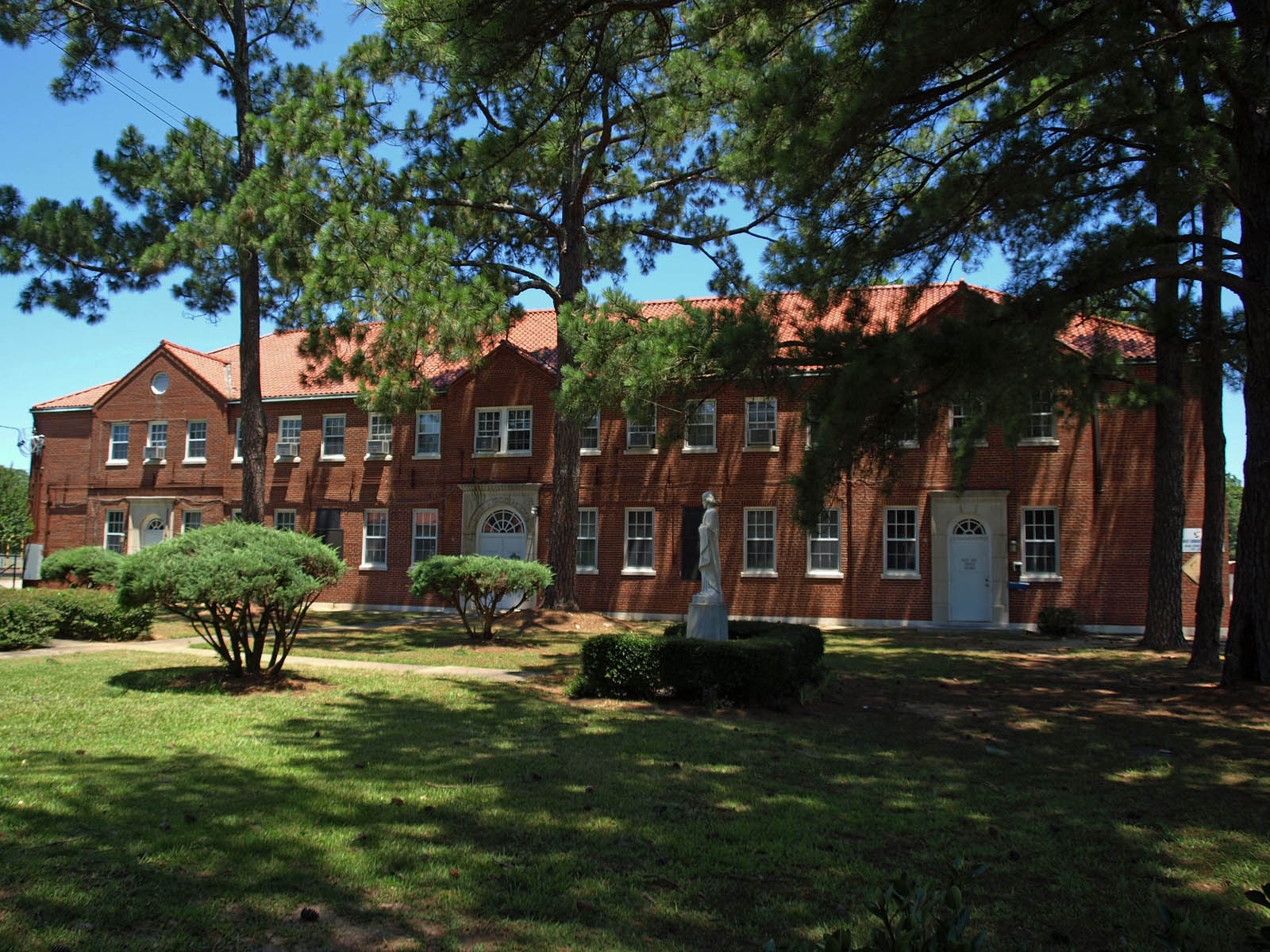
Social Center (2009), with portion of garden that later became the Interpretive Garden

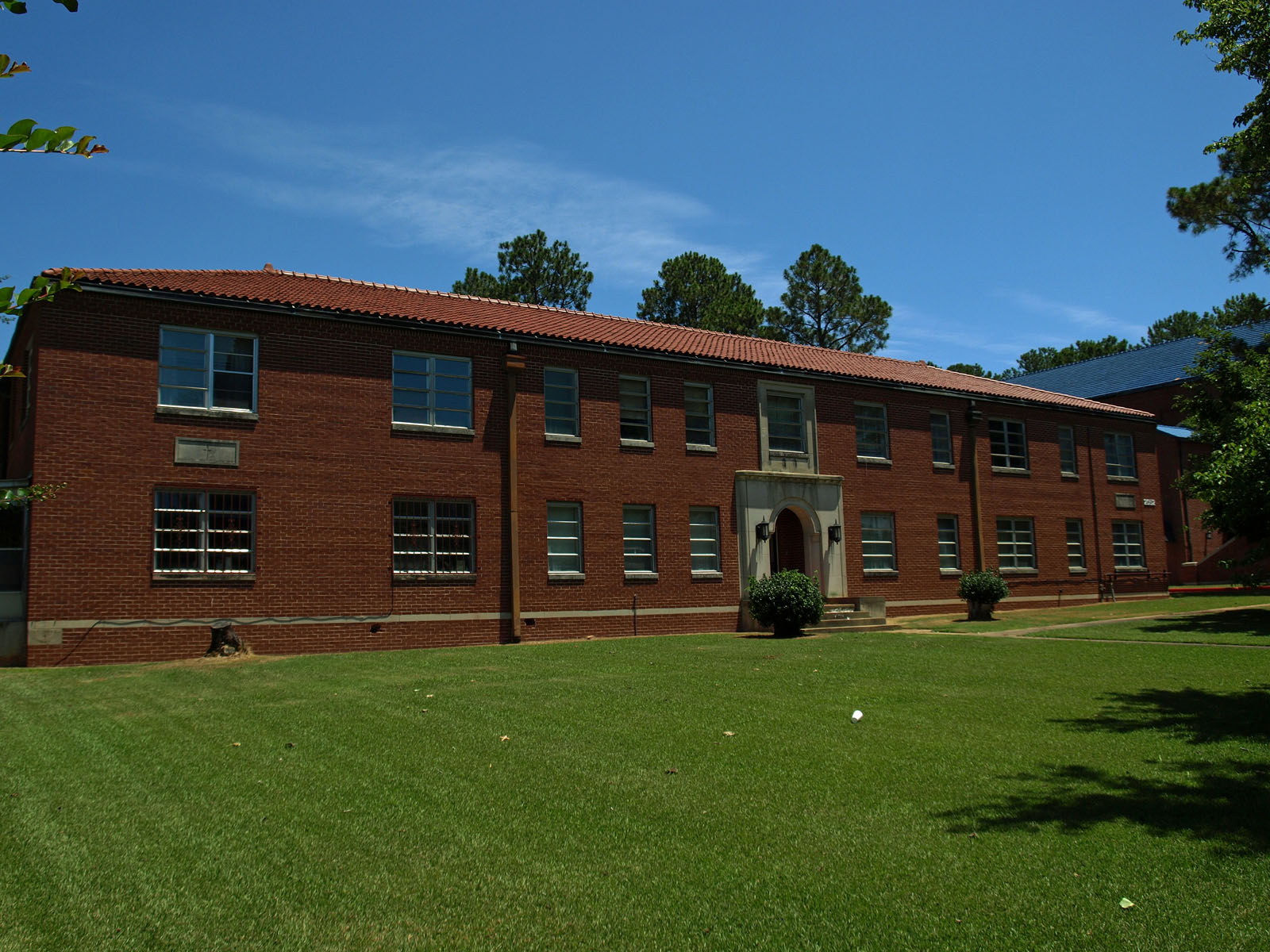
Rectory (2009)
