= Fay Bellamy Powell =

African-American civil rights activist (1938–2013)

- Born: Fay D. Bellamy; May 1, 1938; Clairton, Pennsylvania
- Died: January 5, 2013 (aged 74)
- Occupation: Civil rights activist
- Known for: Student Nonviolent Coordinating Committee, Institute of the Black World, National Anti-Klan Network, We Shall Overcome Fund
- Spouse: William Powell

Fay D. Bellamy Powell (May 1, 1938 – January 5, 2013) was an African-American civil rights activist.

Known for her involvement in many organizations tracing the movements of the civil rights movement, Bellamy Powell began her career in the United States Air Force. After serving time with the Air Force, she accepted a position with the Student Nonviolent Coordinating Committee in 1965.

Bellamy Powell worked with the SNCC for many years, serving among her colleagues on the front lines of the civil rights movement. She later went on to serve on the staff of the Institute of the Black World, and help found the National Anti-Klan Network as well as the We Shall Overcome Fund.

After a long life as an influential activist, Fay D. Bellamy Powell died at the age of 74, on January 5, 2013.

== Early years ==
Born in Clairton, Pennsylvania, Fay Bellamy grew up in a U.S. steel town in Western Pennsylvania. Her mother died when she was four years old, and her father served in the military. Thus, she was raised primarily by extended family: her mother's sisters and their families. Mary, Clara Fordham and Clyde, specifically, were her primary caregivers.

Throughout her childhood, Bellamy attended Mount Olive Baptist church. While in attendance, she participated in junior choir and weekly prayer meetings. When she turned 16 years old, Bellamy decided that although she respected and appreciated the idea of religion, it was not hers.

Bellamy attended a neighborhood school, from kindergarten through high school all in the same town. It was not until she graduated from high school that Bellamy left her home town of Clairton.

After high school, Bellamy joined the United States Air Force. She received basic training at Lackland Air Force Base in Texas. From there, she went to McGuire Air Force Base, where she was stationed in New Jersey. Here, she served at Fort Dix, in the hospital area.

After her time in the Air Force, Bellamy moved all over the United States, from Florida to New York City to San Francisco, before settling down in Alabama.

== Later years ==
In 1965, Bellamy Powell accepted a position working with the Student Nonviolent Coordinating Committee. She led the Selma, Alabama office of the SNCC for many years, serving in many positions. In Hands on the Freedom Plow: Personal Accounts by Women in SNCC, she wrote of her time in the SNCC, "I immediately became the entire office staff: the manager, the secretary, receptionist, and typist, as well as media specialist."

An active leader, Bellamy Powell believed that she should do no less than what she asked of others, stating, "I was not looking for more danger, but I really believed that I shouldn’t do less than what I would ask others to do." Thus, she often worked in field among her colleagues, participating in the civil rights organizing efforts in Greene County, Alabama.

A significant part of Bellamy Powell's life, the Student Nonviolent Cooperation Committee became one of the most important organizations in the struggle for black freedom. In fact, she was a part of the committee during the famous Selma to Montgomery marches in 1965. Although Bellamy Powell was a key member of many roles during her time with the SNCC, she is remembered for keeping the Black woman's perspective as a central part of the meetings, always using her knowledge and experience to advance the group in a healthy and influential fashion.

Following in the footsteps of her work with the SNCC, Bellamy Powell made many other prolific contributions to the civil rights movement. She later served on the staff of the Institute of the Black World, a group of people committed to strengthening the ability of Black communities in the United States to thrive in society.

As a continuation of her involvement in the empowerment of African-Americans, Bellamy Powell played a key role in the foundation of multiple organizations: the National Anti-Klan Network, and the We Shall Overcome Fund. The latter of which was founded to nurture grassroots efforts within African-American communities to combat injustice. Working with the Highlander Folk School, Bellamy Powell served on the board of the We Shall Overcome Fund at a social justice leadership and training center for more than 50 years.

Known among those close to her as more than just an activist, Bellamy Powell is remembered as an empowering photographer. A colleague at the Highlander Folk School, Kristi Coleman, recalls an encounter with one of her photographs, "It was what we are. I didn’t even know she was taking the picture. Her pictures were words." With an avid clarity, her photographs, like her wisdom, carried her voice with them.

"You have to be open to hear other people," Bellamy told the Voices Across the Color Line Oral History Project by Kenan Research Center at the Atlanta History Center. "If you don’t, what you’re about is nothing. You’re about yourself, which is not what the movement is." Bellamy Powell lived her life for others, engaging with and empowering people throughout her life's work.

== Death and funeral ==
Civil rights and the entire social justice movement lost a great leader when Fay Bellamy Powell died on January 5, 2013. A memorial service was held a few days later through the Murray Brothers funeral home in Atlanta, Georgia. Her calm demeanor and no-nonsense attitude gained her many followers, while her ability to listen gained her many friends. Her death is a loss felt by many, across decades of influence.

== See also ==
- List of civil rights leaders
- Racism in the United States
- Timeline of the civil rights movement
