= Selma to Montgomery National Historic Trail =

National Historic Trail in Alabama

Selma to Montgomery National Historic Route
- Length: 54 mi (87 km)
- Surface: Asphalt

The Selma to Montgomery National Historic Trail is a 54-mile (87 km) National Historic Trail in Alabama. It commemorates and marks the journey of the participants of the 1965 Selma to Montgomery marches in support of the Voting Rights Act.

== History ==
The Selma to Montgomery March occurred on March 21 to 25, 1965, and was led by Dr Martin Luther King. This march was the culmination of several weeks of activity, during which demonstrators had tried to march on two occasions. They were stopped on both occasions, once violently, by the police. Approximately 25,000 people joined the March and it became a landmark event in the Civil Rights Movement, leading directly to the passing of the Voting Rights Act of 1965. The march brought public attention to the injustices faced by African Americans in voting.

In 1996, it was designated as a National Historic Trail in an act proposed by President Bill Clinton and passed by Congress, to be preserved by the National Park Service.

In March 2005, a re-enactment of the march took place to commemorate its 40th anniversary. This anniversary led to the creation of a pedestrian walk around Selma.

In 2015 the Marion to Selma Connecting Trail was designated to connect the Selma to Montgomery National Historic Trail with the site of Jimmie Lee Jackson's murder.

The Consolidated Appropriations Act, 2022 directed the National Park Service to study potential additions to the trail and whether it should become a unit of the National Park System.

== Route ==
Historic Trail map

The Selma to Montgomery National Historic Trail is the shortest of the National Historic Trails at 54 miles.

The National Historic Trail starts at the Mount Zion AME Zion Church in Marion. Route signs lead people from Marion to Selma, where there is an interpretative center for the trail. After visiting the center, the trail continues on to the Edmund Pettus Bridge. The trail then follows U.S. Route 80 to White Hall, where the Lownes Interpretative Center is based. The trail follows US Highway 80 until it reaches the state capital, Montgomery.

Markers along the route point out the places where marchers camped, as well as other historic moments from the March, such as the murder of Viola Liuzzo or the place in St Jude's historic district where musicians Harry Belafonte, Tony Bennett, and Peter, Paul & Mary performed for the marchers.

As well as being a National Historic Trail, the route is also designated a National Scenic Byway.

=== Driving ===
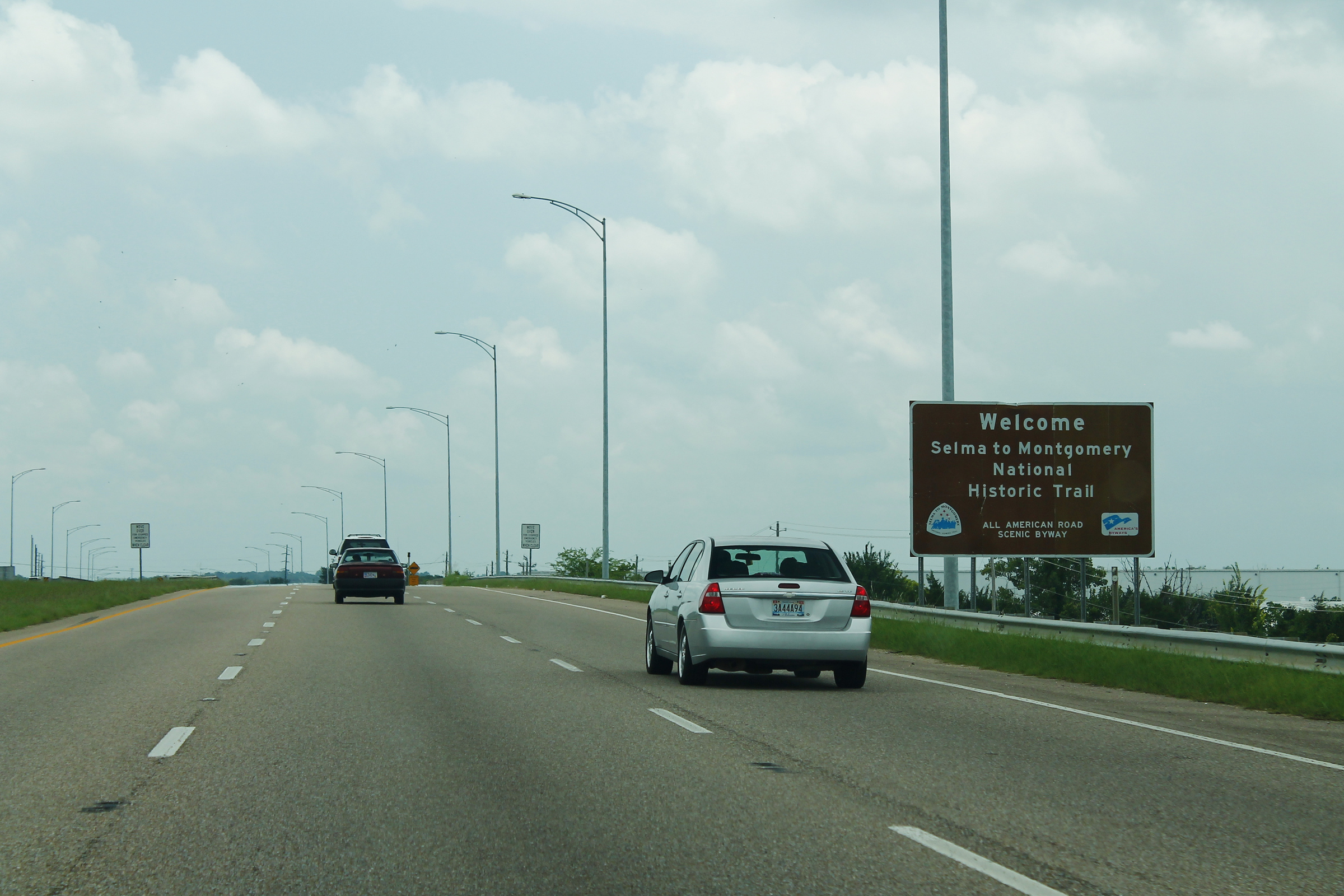
Road sign on U.S. Route 80 marking the Selma to Montgomery National Historic Trail

In common with other National Historic Trails, the National Park Service recommends that people wanting to follow the route drive.

=== Walking ===
The Selma to Montgomery National Historic Trail has no designated safe path for pedestrians wanting to walk between the two cities. The highway is busy with trucks passing regularly at speed.

=== Cycling ===
To commemorate 55 years since the Selma to Montgomery marches, cyclists from over 30 states met in February 2020 to travel the route the marchers walked. Over 600 cyclists joined the group. It was only the second time the route had been cycled as a public commemorative act - the first time was in 2015 to mark the 50th anniversary of the march.

== Reception ==
The Selma to Montgomery National Historic Route is one of the sites criticized for not emphasizing enough the role of African-American women in its route and interpretation.
