= Richie Jean Jackson =

American author, teacher, and civil rights activist (1932–2013)

- Born: Richie Jean Sherrod; August 30, 1932; Mobile, Alabama, U.S.
- Died: November 10, 2013 (aged 81); Mobile, Alabama, U.S.
- Other name: Jean Jackson
- Education: Alabama State College; University of Montevallo
- Occupations: Author, teacher, and civil rights activist
- Movement: Civil Rights Movement; Peace movement
- Spouse: Dr. Sullivan Jackson
- Children: Jawana Virginia Jackson
- Parent(s): John W. Sherrod and Juanita Richardson Sherrod

Richie Jean Sherrod Jackson (née Sherrod; August 30, 1932 – November 10, 2013), was an American author, teacher, and civil rights activist.

== Early life and education ==
Jackson was born in Mobile, Alabama, as the only child of John W. and Juanita Richardson Sherrod. She was a childhood friend of Coretta Scott King. She attended and graduated from Cardoza High School in Washington, D.C. She earned a Bachelor of Science degree in secondary education at Alabama State College, and a Masters of Education at the University of Montevallo. She was married to Dr. Sullivan Jackson. They had one child, a girl named Jawana Virginia Jackson.

== Civil rights activist ==
In February 1964, Martin Luther King Jr., Southern Christian Leadership Conference staff, and members of Congress met for strategy sessions to plan the Selma to Montgomery marches in Jackson's Selma, Alabama home. After the first attempted march on March 7, 1965 (known as Bloody Sunday), Assistant U. S. Attorney General John Doar and Florida Governor LeRoy Collins, the latter of whom was there representing President Lyndon Johnson, met with King and others at Jackson's house. This led to a second attempt at a voting rights march from Selma to Montgomery, and finally a third and successful attempt. It was also in Jackson's home that Martin Luther King Jr. watched Lyndon Johnson give his Voting Rights Act Address on March 15, 1965. The home was acquired by The Henry Ford, and is now, as of June 12, 2026, on permanent display in Greenfield Village.

== Legacy ==
Jackson wrote a memoir, The House by the Side of the Road: The Selma Civil Rights Movement, which was published in 2011 by The University of Alabama Press. A tribute to her life was delivered in the U.S. House of Representatives by Alabama representative Terri Sewell in 2013. In 2014, her house, known as the Sullivan and Richie Jean Jackson House, was listed on the National Register of Historic Places. Also in 2014, Niecy Nash played Jackson in the historical drama film Selma, directed by Ava DuVernay.
