= Joseph Ellwanger =

American pastor (born 1934)

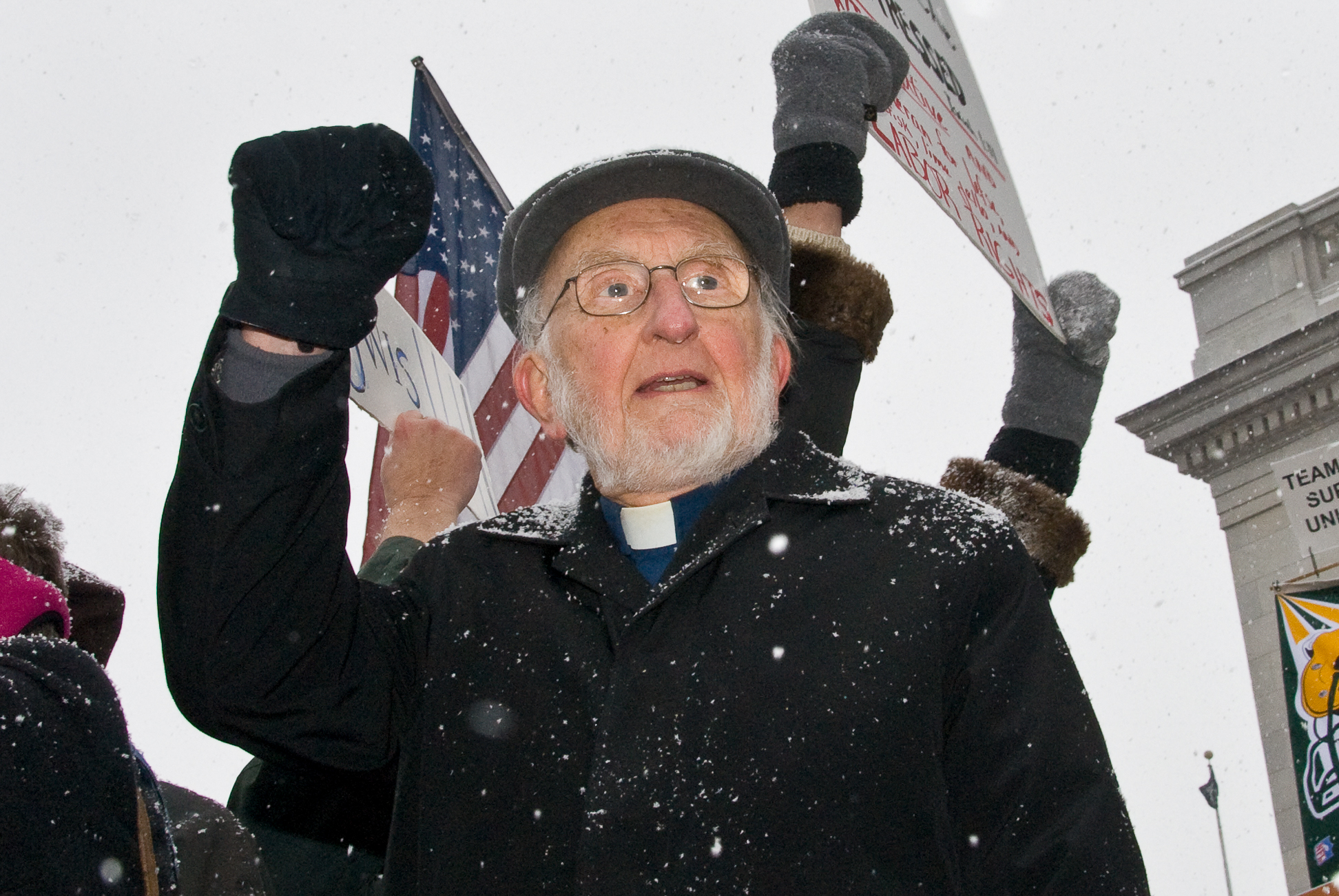
- Ellwanger in 2011

Personal details
- Born: February 22, 1933 (age 93) St. Louis, MO, U.S.
- Spouse: Joyce
- Education: Concordia Seminary
- Occupation: Pastor, Civil Rights Activist
- Awards include the Human Rights Award from the Birmingham Civil Rights Institute

Joseph W. Ellwanger Jr. (born February 22, 1933) is a Lutheran pastor, author, and civil rights activist. He was a key figure in the Civil Rights Movement in Birmingham, Alabama, and the only white religious leader included in strategy meetings with Martin Luther King Jr.

== Early life and education ==
Born in 1933, Ellwanger spent part of his childhood in Selma, Alabama, where his father was a pastor and president of Alabama Lutheran Academy and College. Ellwanger graduated from Concordia Seminary in St. Louis, Missouri.

== Career ==
From 1958 to 1967, Ellwanger served as pastor of an African-American church, St. Paul Lutheran, in Birmingham. During that time, Ellwanger became colleagues with Martin Luther King Jr.

Ellwanger answered the call of King and the Southern Christian Leadership Conference to recruit students and clergy to join the movement in Selma to take part in the march for voting rights from Selma to the state capital of Montgomery. Ellwanger took part in mass meetings, involving himself and members of his congregation in Civil Rights activities, and ultimately took a leadership role in community organizing. Ellwanger helped Martin Luther King Jr. and others plan the Birmingham demonstrations and helped organize the Saturday, March 6, 1965, march in Selma to support voting rights.

Ellwanger was the only white minister in Birmingham who took such an active role in supporting equal rights for African Americans. Ellwanger spoke at the funeral for one of the four girls killed in the 16th Street Baptist Church bombing in September, 1963, where Dr. King delivered the eulogy.

King included Ellwanger in a group of 15 pastors who met with Governor George Wallace. Ellwanger also met with President Lyndon B. Johnson to voice support for the Voting Rights Act of 1965.

In 1967, Ellwanger left for Milwaukee, Wisconsin, where he served as pastor of Cross Lutheran Church until 2001. In 1969, Ellwanger worked with the Black Panther Party to expand the free breakfast program in Milwaukee; this program grew into what is now the Hunger Task Force. In 1980, Ellwanger founded the prison ministry "Project RETURN," with the mission of aiding and rehabilitating citizens returning from incarceration. After retiring from Cross Lutheran, Ellwanger spent a decade as a grassroots organizer for WISDOM, a statewide coalition of social justice groups in Wisconsin. Ellwanger founded WISDOM's statewide Reform Our Communities (ROC) Campaign to reform Wisconsin's criminal justice system.

In 2008, Ellwanger was named as the recipient of the Fred L. Shuttlesworth Human Rights Award. It is the highest honor bestowed on an individual by the Birmingham Civil Rights Institute.

Ellwanger was a recipient of the 2016 Social Innovation Prize from Interfaith Older Adult Programs. The award included $10,000 to continue his work to end mass incarceration in Wisconsin.

== Books ==
Ellwanger has been a subject in a number of books, including King: A Biography by David Levering Lewis, Eyes on the Prize: America's Civil Rights Years, 1954-1965 by Juan Williams, Kids in Birmingham 1963, and On the Road to Freedom: A Guided Tour of the Civil Rights Trail by Charles E. Cobb Jr.

- Ellwanger, Joseph (2014). Strength for the Struggle: Insights from the Civil Rights Movement and Urban Ministry. HenschelHAUS Publishing. ISBN 978-1-595-98296-4.
