= Brown Chapel A.M.E. Church (Selma, Alabama) =

Historic church in Alabama, United States

- Brown Chapel African Methodist Episcopal Church
- U.S. National Register of Historic Places
- U.S. National Historic Landmark
- Alabama Register of Landmarks and Heritage
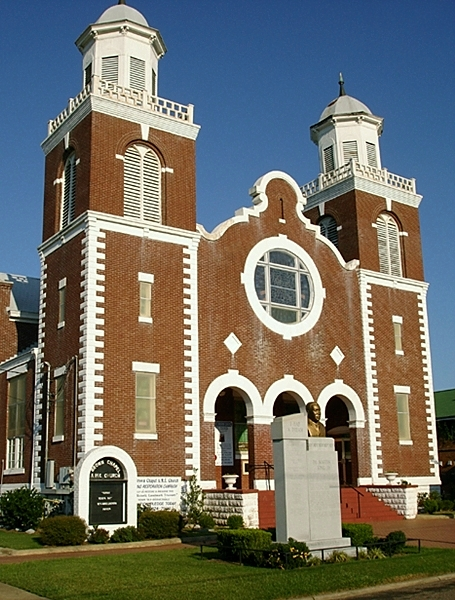
- Brown Chapel African Methodist Episcopal Church, taken in 2000.

- Location within Alabama Location within the United States
- Location: 410 Martin Luther King, Jr., Street, Selma, Alabama
- Coordinates: 32°24′44.65″N 87°0′58.19″W
- Area: less than one acre
- Built: 1908
- Architect: A. J. Farley
- Architectural style: Romanesque Revival
- NRHP reference No.: 82002009

Significant dates
- Added to NRHP: February 4, 1982
- Designated NHL: December 12, 1997
- Designated ARLH: June 16, 1976

Brown Chapel A.M.E. Church is a church at 410 Martin Luther King Jr. Boulevard in Selma, Alabama, United States. This church was a starting point for the Selma to Montgomery marches in 1965 and, as the meeting place and offices of the Southern Christian Leadership Conference (SCLC) during the Selma Movement, played a major role in the events that led to the adoption of the Voting Rights Act of 1965. The nation's reaction to Selma's "Bloody Sunday" march is widely credited with making the passage of the Voting Rights Act politically viable in the United States Congress.

It was added to the Alabama Register of Landmarks and Heritage on June 16, 1976, and later declared a National Historic Landmark on February 4, 1982.

The structure sustained significant damage from termites and mold while it was unoccupied during the COVID-19 pandemic, and it was included on the National Trust for Historic Preservation's annual list of America's 11 Most Endangered Places in 2022.

== Description ==
The Brown Chapel A.M.E. Church is located northeast of downtown Selma, on the east side of Martin Luther King Jr. Boulevard between St. Johns Street and Clark Avenue. It is a large masonry structure, built out of red brick with white stone trim. Stylistically it is basically Romanesque Revival, built in the shape of a Greek cross with Byzantine influences. Its facade has its entries recessed behind an arcade of three rounded arches, and is flanked by a pair of square towers topped by octagonal lanterns and cupolas. The only major exterior alteration is a functional addition to the rear, housing kitchen and other facilities.

The church was built in 1908 to a design by A. J. Farley. Its congregation arose out of a combined African-American and white congregation of Methodists which separated by race in 1866. Its first sanctuary was built on this site in 1869. It is best known today for its role as the site of organizational meetings related to several major events in the Civil Rights Movement of the 1950s and 1960s. The Southern Christian Leadership Conference (SCLC), one of the principal organizations of civil rights activists, used the church as its Selma headquarters during protest activities organized in 1964 and 1965 that led to the eventual passage of the Voting Rights Act of 1965.

== See also ==
- List of National Historic Landmarks in Alabama
- Selma, 2015 film
- National Voting Rights Museum
