= Selma to Montgomery marches =

1965 nonviolent protests for African-American voting rights in Alabama, United States

- Part of the civil rights movement
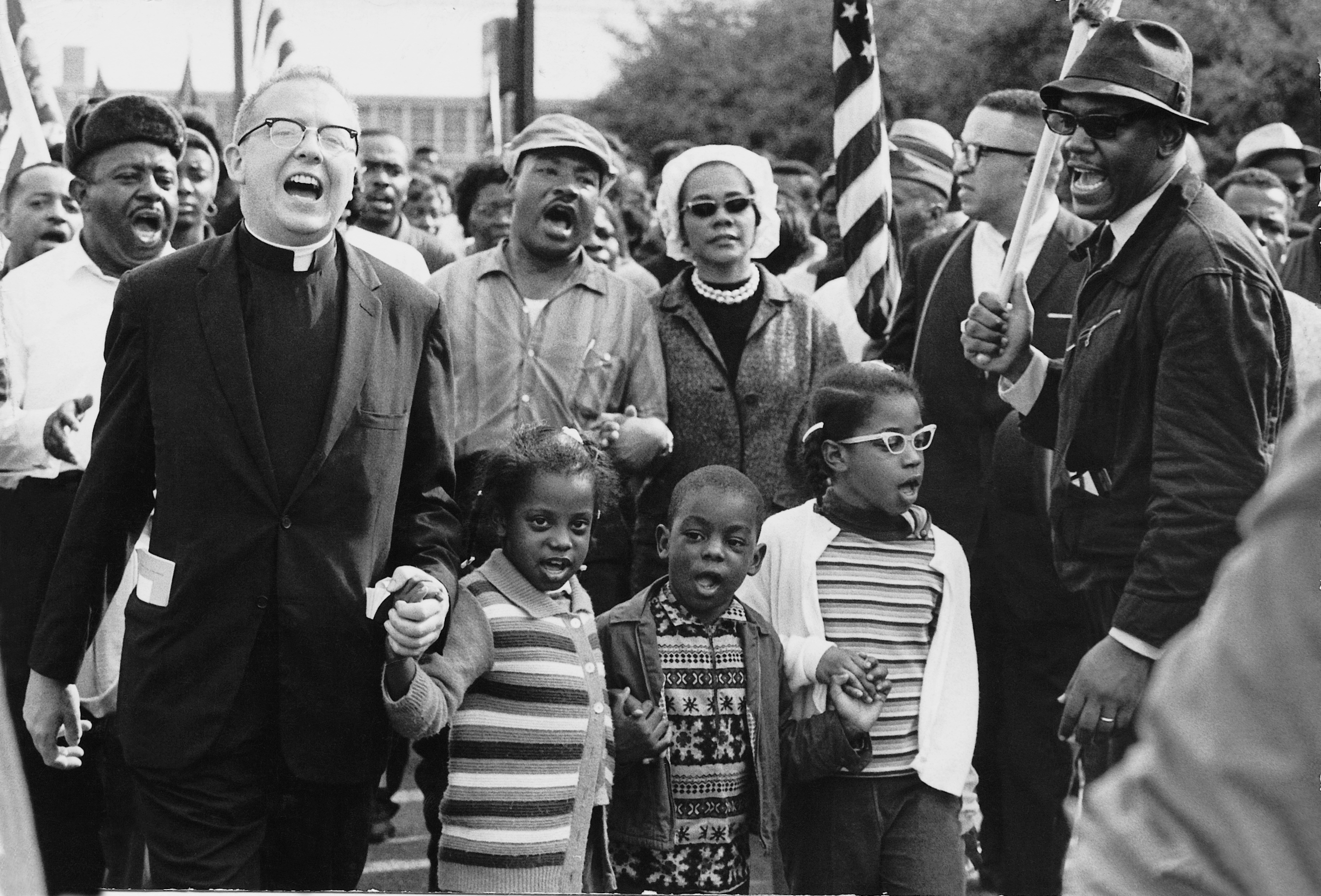
- James Reeb marching with Ralph Abernathy, Martin Luther King Jr., Coretta Scott King, and others.
- Date: March 7–25, 1965 (19 days)
- Location: Brown Chapel A.M.E. Church, Edmund Pettus Bridge, U.S. Route 80, Haisten's Mattress & Awning Company, Alabama State Capitol, Selma and Montgomery, Alabama
- Caused by: Murder of Jimmie Lee Jackson; African Americans obstructed from registering to vote; Failed voter registration campaign
- Result: Speech "The American Promise" delivered by Lyndon B. Johnson as Special Message before Congress; Introduction of Senate bill 1964, a voting rights bill, in the 89th United States Congress; Hastened passage of voting rights bill in Congress; Speech "How Long? Not Long" delivered by Martin Luther King Jr. at the Alabama State Capitol

Parties
Dallas County Voters League (DCVL); Southern Christian Leadership Conference (SCLC); Student Nonviolent Coordinating Committee (SNCC)	State of Alabama: Governor of Alabama; Department of Public Safety; Dallas County Circuit Court; Dallas County Sheriff; Board of Registrar; Mayor of Selma; Selma Department of Safety; Dallas County Citizens' Council

Lead figures
SCLC members: James Bevel; Martin Luther King Jr.; Diane Nash; James Orange; Richard C. Boone; Hosea Williams; DCVL members: Ulysses S. Blackmon Sr.; Amelia Boynton; Samuel Boynton; Bruce Boynton; Joseph Ellwanger; Rev. Frederick Reese; Rev. L. L. Anderson; J. L. Chestnut; Annie Lee Cooper; Marie Foster; James E. Gildersleeve; SNCC members: Stokely Carmichael; James Forman; Prathia Hall; Bernard Lafayette; John Lewis	State of Alabama: George Wallace, Governor; Albert J. Lingo, Director of the Alabama Department of Public Safety; Major John Cloud, Commander of Alabama State Troopers; Dallas County: Judge James Hare, Circuit Court; Jim Clark, Sheriff of Dallas County; J. P. Majors, Dallas County Registrar; City of Selma: Joseph Smitherman, mayor; Wilson Baker, Public Safety Director of Selma

Casualties
- Deaths: 4 protestors
- Injuries: ~58 protestors
- Arrested: 3300+ protestors

The Selma to Montgomery marches were three protest marches, held in 1965, along the 54-mile (87 km) highway from Selma, Alabama, to the state capital of Montgomery. The marches were organized by nonviolent activists to demonstrate the desire of African-American citizens to exercise their constitutional right to vote, in defiance of segregationist repression; they were part of a broader voting rights movement underway in Selma and throughout the American South. By highlighting racial injustice, they contributed to passage that year of the Voting Rights Act, a landmark federal achievement of the civil rights movement.

Since the late 19th century, Southern state legislatures had passed and maintained a series of Jim Crow laws that had disenfranchised the millions of African Americans across the South and enforced racial segregation. The initial voter registration drive, started in 1963 by the African-American Dallas County Voters League (DCVL) and the Student Nonviolent Coordinating Committee (SNCC) failed as local White officials arrested the organizers and otherwise harassed Blacks wishing to register to vote. The passage of the Civil Rights Act of 1964 legally ended segregation but the situation in Selma changed little. The DCVL then invited Rev. Martin Luther King Jr. and the activists of the Southern Christian Leadership Conference (SCLC) to amplify the efforts, and these figures drew more prominent people to Alabama. Local and regional protests began in January 1965, with 3,000 people arrested by the end of February. On February 26, activist and deacon Jimmie Lee Jackson died after being shot several days earlier by state trooper James Bonard Fowler during a peaceful march in nearby Marion. To defuse and refocus the Black community's outrage, James Bevel, who was directing SCLC's Selma voting rights movement, called for a march of dramatic length, from Selma to the state capital of Montgomery, calling for an unhindered exercise of the right to vote.

The first march took place on March 7, 1965, led by figures including Bevel and Amelia Boynton, but was ended by state troopers and county possemen, who charged on about 600 unarmed protesters with batons and tear gas after they crossed the Edmund Pettus Bridge in the direction of Montgomery. The event became known as Bloody Sunday. Law enforcement beat Boynton unconscious, and the media publicized worldwide a picture of her lying wounded on the bridge. The second march took place two days later but King cut it short as a federal court issued a temporary injunction against further marches. That night, an anti-civil rights group murdered civil rights activist James Reeb, a Unitarian Universalist minister from Boston. The third march, which started on March 21, was escorted by the Alabama National Guard under federal control, the FBI and federal marshals (segregationist governor George Wallace refused to protect the protesters). Thousands of marchers averaged 10 mi (16 km) a day along U.S. Route 80 (US 80), reaching Montgomery on March 24. The following day, 25,000 people staged a demonstration on the steps of the Alabama State Capitol.

The violence of "Bloody Sunday" and Reeb's murder resulted in a national outcry, and the marches were widely discussed in national and international news media. The protesters campaigned for a new federal voting rights law to enable African Americans to register and vote without harassment. President Lyndon B. Johnson seized the opportunity and held a historic, nationally televised joint session of Congress on March 15, asking lawmakers to pass what is now known as the Voting Rights Act of 1965. He enacted it on August 6, removing obstacles for Blacks to register en masse. The march route is memorialized and designated as the Selma to Montgomery National Historic Trail.

== Selma movement established: 1963–1964 ==
At the turn of the 20th century, the Alabama state legislature passed a new constitution that effectively disenfranchised most blacks and many poor whites by requirements for payment of a poll tax and passing a literacy test and comprehension of the constitution. Subjective application of the laws effectively closed most blacks out of politics. Selma is a major town and the seat of Dallas County, part of the Alabama Black Belt with a majority-black population. In 1961, the population of Dallas County was 57% black, but of the 15,000 blacks old enough to vote, only 130 were registered (fewer than 1%). At that time, more than 80% of Dallas County blacks lived below the poverty line, most of them working as sharecroppers, farmhands, maids, janitors, and day laborers, but there were also teachers and business owners. With the literacy test administered subjectively by white registrars, even educated blacks were prevented from registering or voting.

Led by the Boynton family (Amelia, Sam, and son Bruce), L. L. Anderson, J. L. Chestnut, and Marie Foster, the Dallas County Voters League (DCVL) tried to register black citizens during the late 1950s and early 1960s. Their efforts were blocked by state and local officials, the White Citizens' Council, and the Ku Klux Klan. By the 1960s, county officials and the Citizens' Council used such tactics as restricted registration hours; economic pressure, including threatening people's jobs, firing them, evicting people from leased homes, and economic boycotts of black-owned businesses; and violence against blacks who tried to register. The Society of Saint Edmund, an order of Catholics committed to alleviating poverty and promoting civil rights, were the only whites in Selma who openly supported the voting rights campaign. Student Nonviolent Coordinating Committee (SNCC) staff member Don Jelinek later described this order as "the unsung heroes of the Selma March ... who provided the only integrated Catholic church in Selma, and perhaps in the entire Deep South".

In early 1963, SNCC organizers Bernard Lafayette and Colia Liddel Lafayette arrived in Selma to begin a voter-registration project in cooperation with the DCVL. In mid-June, Bernard was beaten and almost killed by Klansmen determined to prevent blacks from voting. When the Lafayettes returned to college in the fall, SNCC organizers Prathia Hall and Worth Long carried on the work despite arrests, beatings, and death threats. When 32 black school teachers applied at the county courthouse to register as voters, they were immediately fired by the all-white school board.

After the Birmingham church bombing on September 15, 1963, which killed four black girls, black students in Selma began sit-ins at local lunch counters to protest segregation; they were physically attacked and arrested. More than 300 were arrested in two weeks of protests, including SNCC chairman John Lewis.

On October 7, 1963, one of two days during the month when residents were allowed to go to the courthouse to apply to register to vote, SNCC's James Forman and the DCVL mobilized more than 300 blacks from Dallas County to line up at the voter registration office in what was called a "Freedom Day". Supporting them were national figures: author James Baldwin and his brother David, and comedian Dick Gregory and his wife Lillian (she was later arrested for picketing with SNCC activists and local supporters). SNCC members who tried to bring water to African Americans waiting in line were arrested, as were those who held signs saying "Register to Vote". After waiting all day in the hot sun, only a handful of the hundreds in the line were allowed to fill out the voter application, and most of those applications were denied by white county officials. United States Justice Department lawyers and FBI agents were present and observing the scene, but took no action against local officials.

On July 2, 1964, President Johnson signed the Civil Rights Act of 1964 into law, prohibiting segregation of public facilities. Some Jim Crow laws and customs remained in effect in Selma and other places for some time. When activists resumed efforts to integrate Selma's eating and entertainment venues, blacks who tried to attend the Wilby Theatre or the Selmont Drive-in theater and eat at the 25¢ hamburger stand were both beaten and arrested.

On July 6, 1964, one of the two registration days that month, John Lewis led 50 black citizens to the courthouse, but county sheriff Jim Clark arrested them all instead of allowing them to apply to vote. On July 9, 1964, Judge James Hare issued an injunction forbidding any gathering of three or more people under the sponsorship of civil rights organizations or leaders. This injunction made it illegal for more than two people at a time to talk about civil rights or voter registration in Selma, suppressing public civil rights activity there for the next six months.

== 1965 campaign launched ==
=== Background ===
With civil rights activity blocked by Judge Hare's injunction, Frederick Douglas Reese requested the assistance of King and the SCLC. Reese was president of the DCVL, but the group declined to invite the SCLC; the invitation instead came from a group of local activists who would become known as the Courageous Eight – Ulysses S. Blackmon Sr., Amelia Boynton, Ernest Doyle, Marie Foster, James Gildersleeve, J.D. Hunter Sr., Henry Shannon Sr., and Reese.

Three of SCLC's main organizers – James Bevel, Diane Nash, and James Orange – had already been working on Bevel's Alabama Voting Rights Project since late 1963. King and the executive board of SCLC had not joined it.

When SCLC officially accepted the invitation from the "Courageous Eight", Bevel, Nash, Orange, and others in SCLC began working in Selma in December 1964. They also worked in the surrounding counties, along with the SNCC staff who had been active there since early 1963.

Since the rejection of voting status for the Mississippi Freedom Democratic Party delegates by the regular delegates at the 1964 Democratic National Convention in Atlantic City, major tensions between SCLC and SNCC had been brewing. SCLC ultimately remained neutral in the MFDP dispute to maintain its ties with the national Democratic coalition. Many SNCC members believed they were in an adversarial position with an American establishment which they thought had scorned grassroots democracy. SNCC's focus was on bottom-up organizing, establishing deep-rooted local power bases through community organizing. They had become distrustful of SCLC's spectacular mobilizations which were designed to appeal to the national media and Washington, D.C., but which, most of SNCC believed, did not result in major improvements for the lives of African Americans on the ground. But, SNCC chairman John Lewis (also an SCLC board member), believed mass mobilizations to be invaluable, and he urged the group to participate. SNCC called in Fay Bellamy and Silas Norman to be full-time organizers in Selma.

Selma had both moderate and hardline segregationists in its white power structure. The newly elected mayor Joseph Smitherman was a moderate who hoped to attract Northern business investment, and he was very conscious of the city's image. Smitherman appointed veteran lawman Wilson Baker to head the city's 30-man police force. Baker believed that the most effective method of undermining civil rights protests was to de-escalate them and deny them publicity, as Police Chief Laurie Pritchett had done against the Albany Movement in Georgia. He earned what was described as a grudging respect from activists.

The hardline of segregation was represented by Dallas County sheriff Jim Clark, who used violence and repression to maintain Jim Crow. He commanded a posse of 200 deputies, some of whom were members of Ku Klux Klan chapters or the National States' Rights Party. Possemen were armed with electric cattle-prods. Some were mounted on horseback and carried long leather whips they used to lash people on foot. Clark and Chief Baker were known to spar over jurisdiction. Baker's police patrolled the city except for the block of the county courthouse, which Clark and his deputies controlled. Outside the city limits, Clark and his volunteer posse were in complete control in the county.

=== Events of January ===
The Selma Voting Rights Campaign officially started on January 2, 1965, when King addressed a mass meeting in Brown Chapel A.M.E. Church in defiance of the anti-meeting injunction. The date had been chosen because Sheriff Clark was out of town, and Chief Baker had stated he would not enforce the injunction. Over the following weeks, SCLC and SNCC activists expanded voter registration drives and protests in Selma and the adjacent Black Belt counties.

Preparations for mass registration commenced in early January, and with King out of town fundraising, were largely under the leadership of Diane Nash. On January 15, King called President Johnson and the two agreed to begin a major push for voting rights legislation which would assist in advancing the passage of more anti-poverty legislation. After King returned to Selma, the first big "Freedom Day" of the new campaign occurred on January 18.

According to their respective strategies, Chief Baker's police were cordial toward demonstrators, but Sheriff Clark refused to let black registrants enter the county courthouse. Clark made no arrests or assaults at this time. However, in an incident that drew national attention, King was knocked down and kicked by a leader of the National States Rights Party, who was quickly arrested by Chief Baker. Baker also arrested the head of the American Nazi Party, George Lincoln Rockwell, who said he'd come to Selma to "run King out of town".

Over the next week, blacks persisted in their attempts to register. Sheriff Clark responded by arresting organizers, including Amelia Boynton and Hosea Williams. Eventually, 225 registrants were arrested as well at the county courthouse. Their cases were handled by the NAACP Legal Defense Fund. On January 20, President Johnson gave his inaugural address but did not mention voting rights.

Up to this point, the overwhelming majority of registrants and marchers were sharecroppers, blue-collar workers, and students. On January 22, Frederick Reese, a black schoolteacher who was also DCVL president, finally convinced his colleagues to join the campaign and register en masse. When they refused Sheriff Clark's orders to disperse at the courthouse, an ugly scene commenced. Clark's posse beat the teachers away from the door, but they rushed back only to be beaten again. The teachers retreated after three attempts, and marched to a mass meeting where they were celebrated as heroes by the black community.

On January 25, U.S. district judge Daniel Thomas issued rules requiring that at least 100 people must be permitted to wait at the courthouse without being arrested. After Dr. King led marchers to the courthouse that morning, Jim Clark began to arrest all registrants in excess of 100, and corral the rest. Annie Lee Cooper, a fifty-three-year-old practical nurse who had been part of the Selma movement since 1963, struck Clark after he twisted her arm, and she knocked him to his knees. Four deputies seized Cooper, and photographers captured images of Clark beating her repeatedly with his club. The crowd was inflamed and some wanted to intervene against Clark, but King ordered them back as Cooper was taken away. Although Cooper had violated nonviolent discipline, the movement rallied around her.

James Bevel, speaking at a mass meeting, deplored her actions because "then [the press] don't talk about the registration." But when asked about the incident by Jet magazine, Bevel said, "Not everybody who registers is nonviolent; not everybody who registers is supposed to be nonviolent." The incident between Clark and Cooper was a media sensation, putting the campaign on the front page of The New York Times. When asked if she would do it again, Cooper told Jet, "I try to be nonviolent, but I just can't say I wouldn't do the same thing all over again if they treat me brutish like they did this time."

=== Events of February ===
King decided to make a conscious effort to get arrested, for the benefit of publicity. On February 1, King and Ralph Abernathy refused to cooperate with Chief Baker's traffic directions on the way to the courthouse, calculating that Baker would arrest them, putting them in the Selma city jail run by Baker's police, rather than the county jail run by Clark's deputies. Once processed, King and Abernathy refused to post bond. On the same day, SCLC and SNCC organizers took the campaign outside of Dallas County for the first time; in nearby Perry County 700 students and adults, including James Orange, were arrested.

On the same day, students from Tuskegee Institute, working in cooperation with SNCC, were arrested for acts of civil disobedience in solidarity with the Selma campaign. In New York and Chicago, Friends of SNCC chapters staged sit-ins at federal buildings in support of Selma blacks, and CORE chapters in the North and West also mounted protests. Solidarity pickets began circling in front of the White House late into the night.

After the assault on King by the white supremacist in January, black nationalist leader Malcolm X had sent an open telegram to George Lincoln Rockwell, stating: "if your present racist agitation against our people there in Alabama causes physical harm ... you and your KKK friends will be met with maximum physical retaliation from those of us who ... believe in asserting our right to self-defense by any means necessary." Fay Bellamy and Silas Norman attended a talk by Malcolm X to 3,000 students at the Tuskegee Institute, and invited him to address a mass meeting at Brown Chapel A.M.E. Church to kick off the protests on the morning of February 4.

When Malcolm X arrived, SCLC staff initially wanted to block his talk, but he assured them that he did not intend to undermine their work. During his address, Malcolm X warned the protesters about "House Negroes" who, he said, were a hindrance to black liberation. Dr. King later said that he thought this was an attack on him. But Malcolm told Coretta Scott King that he thought to aid the campaign by warning white people what "the alternative" would be if King failed in Alabama. Bellamy recalled that Malcolm told her he would begin recruiting in Alabama for his Organization of Afro-American Unity later that month (Malcolm was assassinated two weeks later).

That February 4, President Lyndon Johnson made his first public statement in support of the Selma campaign. At midday, Judge Thomas, at the Justice Department's urging, issued an injunction that suspended Alabama's current literacy test, ordered Selma to take at least 100 applications per registration day, and guaranteed that all applications received by June 1 would be processed before July. In response to Thomas' favorable ruling, and in alarm at Malcolm X's visit, Andrew Young, who was not in charge of the Selma movement, said he would suspend demonstrations. James Bevel, however, continued to ask people to line up at the voter's registration office as they had been doing, and Dr. King called Young from jail, telling him the demonstrations would continue. They did so the next day, and more than 500 protesters were arrested. On February 5, King bailed himself and Abernathy out of jail. On February 6, the White House announced that it would urge Congress to enact a voting rights bill during the current session and that the vice-president and Attorney General Nicholas Katzenbach would meet with King in the following week. On February 9, King met with Attorney General Katzenbach, Vice President Hubert Humphrey, and White House aides before having a brief, seven-minute session with President Johnson. Following the Oval Office visit, King reported that Johnson planned to deliver his message "very soon".

Throughout that February, King, SCLC staff, and members of Congress met for strategy sessions at the Selma, Alabama, home of Richie Jean Jackson. In addition to actions in Selma, marches and other protests in support of voting rights were held in neighboring Perry, Wilcox, Marengo, Greene, and Hale counties. Attempts were made to organize in Lowndes County, but fear of the Klan there was so intense from previous violence and murders that blacks would not support a nonviolent campaign in great number, even after Dr. King made a personal appearance on March 1.

Overall more than 3,000 people were arrested in protests between January 1 and February 7, but blacks achieved fewer than 100 new registered voters. In addition, hundreds of people were injured or blacklisted by employers due to their participation in the campaign. DCLV activists became increasingly wary of SCLC's protests, preferring to wait and see if Judge Thomas' ruling of February 4 would make a long-term difference. SCLC was less concerned with Dallas County's immediate registration figures, and primarily focused on creating a public crisis that would make a voting rights bill the White House's number one priority. James Bevel and C. T. Vivian both led dramatic nonviolent confrontations at the courthouse in the second week of February. Selma students organized themselves after the SCLC leaders were arrested. King told his staff on February 10 that "to get the bill passed, we need to make a dramatic appeal through Lowndes and other counties because the people of Selma are tired."

By the end of the month, 300 blacks were registered in Selma, compared to 9500 whites.

== First Selma-to-Montgomery march ==
=== Jimmie Lee Jackson's murder ===
On February 18, 1965, C. T. Vivian led a march to the courthouse in Marion, the county seat of neighboring Perry County, to protest the arrest of James Orange. State officials had received orders to target Vivian, and a line of Alabama state troopers waited for the marchers at the Perry County courthouse. Officials had turned off all of the nearby street lights, and state troopers rushed at the protesters, attacking them. Protesters Jimmie Lee Jackson, his grandfather and his mother fled the scene to hide in a nearby café. Alabama State Trooper corporal James Bonard Fowler followed Jackson into the café and shot him, saying he thought the protester was trying to get his gun as they grappled. Jackson died eight days later at Selma's Good Samaritan Hospital, of an infection resulting from the gunshot wound. The death of Jimmie Lee Jackson prompted civil rights leaders to bring their cause directly to Alabama governor George Wallace by performing a 54 mi (87 km) march from Selma to the state capital of Montgomery. Jackson was the only male wage-earner of his household, which lived in extreme poverty. Jackson's grandfather, mother, wife, and children were left with no source of income.

=== Initiation and goals of the march ===
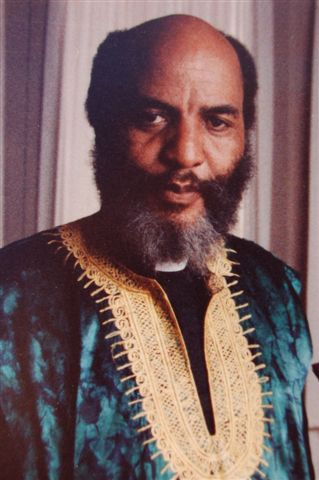
James Bevel, SCLC's director of direct action and nonviolent education, initiated and organized the first march.

During a public meeting at Zion United Methodist Church in Marion on February 28 after Jackson's death, emotions were running high. James Bevel, as director of the Selma voting rights movement for SCLC, called for a march from Selma to Montgomery to talk to Governor George Wallace directly about Jackson's death, and to ask him if he had ordered the State Troopers to turn off the lights and attack the marchers. Bevel strategized that this would focus the anger and pain of the people of Marion and Selma toward a nonviolent goal, as many were so outraged they wanted to retaliate with violence.

The marchers also hoped to bring attention to the continued violations of their Constitutional rights by marching to Montgomery. King agreed with Bevel's plan of the march, which they both intended to symbolize a march for full voting rights. They were to ask Governor Wallace to protect black registrants.

SNCC had severe reservations about the march, especially when they heard that King would not be present. They permitted John Lewis to participate, and SNCC provided logistical support, such as the use of its Wide Area Telephone Service (WATS) lines and the services of the Medical Committee on Human Rights, organized by SNCC during the Mississippi Summer Project of 1964.

Governor Wallace denounced the march as a threat to public safety; he said that he would take all measures necessary to prevent it from happening. "There will be no march between Selma and Montgomery," Wallace said on March 6, 1965, citing concern over traffic violations. He ordered Alabama Highway Patrol chief Col. Al Lingo to "use whatever measures are necessary to prevent a march".

=== "Bloody Sunday" events ===
Bloody Sunday
- Part of the Selma to Montgomery marches
- Date: March 7, 1965
- Location: Edmund Pettus Bridge, Selma, Alabama, U.S.
- Cause: Disenfranchisement and voter suppression of African Americans; the killing of Jimmie Lee Jackson
- Participants: John Lewis; Hosea Williams; Amelia Boynton Robinson; Dallas County Voters League (DCVL); Southern Christian Leadership Conference (SCLC); Student Nonviolent Coordinating Committee (SNCC)
- Outcome: National outrage; accelerated the passage of the landmark Voting Rights Act of 1965
- Casualties: 17 hospitalized, over 50 injured total
- Suspects: Alabama State Troopers (under Major John Cloud); Dallas County Sheriff's Posse (under Sheriff Jim Clark)

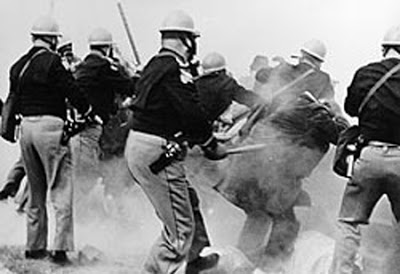
Alabama Highway Patrol troopers attack civil rights demonstrators outside Selma, Alabama, on Bloody Sunday, March 7, 1965

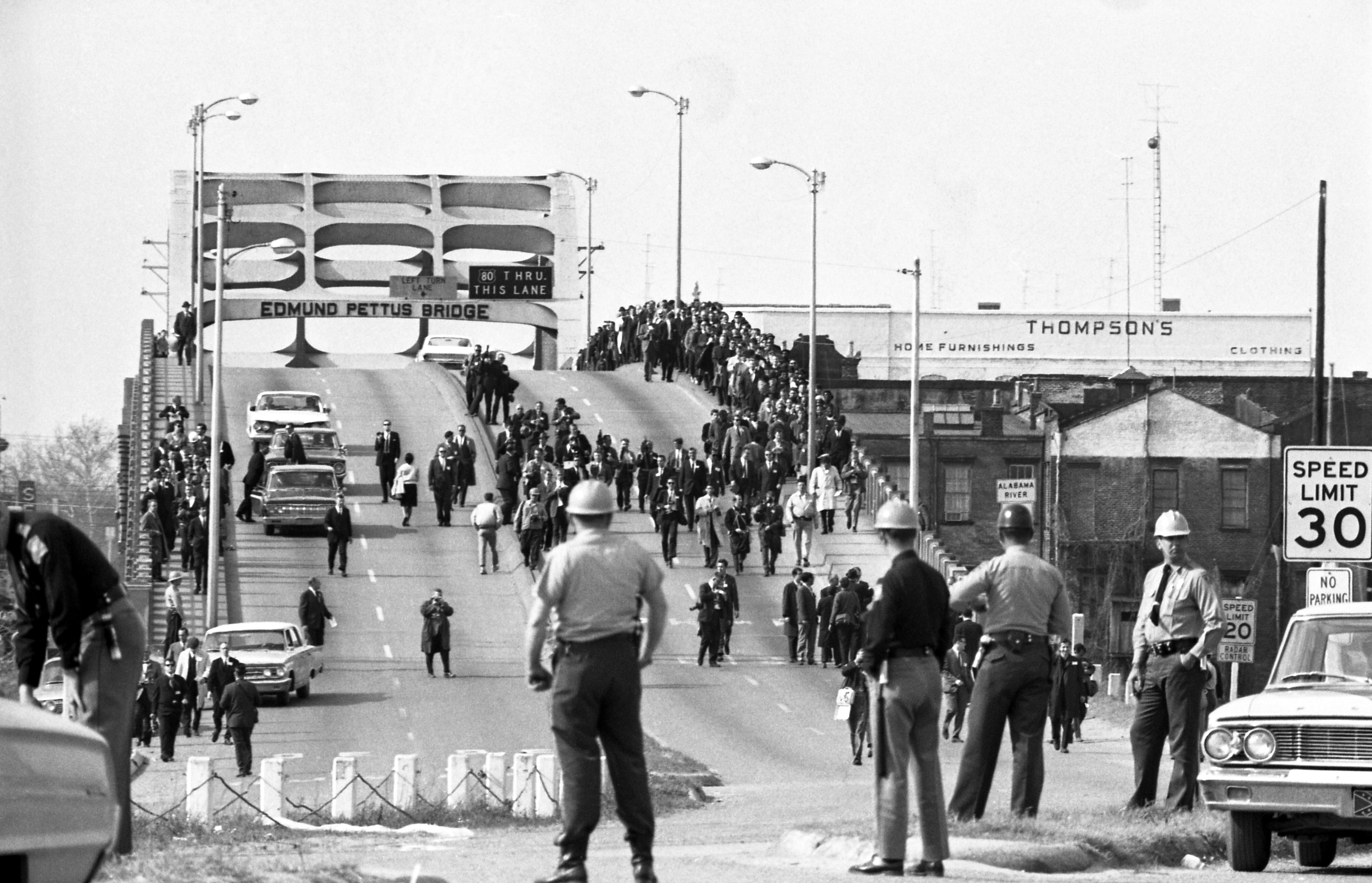
Bloody Sunday-officers await demonstrators

On March 7, 1965, an estimated 525 to 600 civil rights marchers headed southeast out of Selma on U.S. Highway 80. The march was led by John Lewis of SNCC and Hosea Williams of SCLC, followed by Bob Mants of SNCC and Albert Turner of SCLC. The protest went according to plan until the marchers crossed the Edmund Pettus Bridge, where they encountered a wall of state troopers and county posse waiting for them on the other side.

County sheriff Jim Clark had issued an order for all white men in Dallas County over the age of twenty-one to report to the courthouse that morning to be deputized. Commanding officer John Cloud told the demonstrators to disband at once and go home. Rev. Hosea Williams tried to speak to the officer, but Cloud curtly informed him there was nothing to discuss. Seconds later, the troopers began shoving the demonstrators, knocking many to the ground and beating them with nightsticks. Another detachment of troopers fired tear gas, and mounted troopers charged the crowd on horseback.

Televised images of the brutal attack presented Americans and international audiences with horrifying images of marchers left bloodied and severely injured, and roused support for the Selma Voting Rights Campaign. Amelia Boynton, who had helped organize the march as well as marching in it, was beaten unconscious. A photograph of her lying on the road of the Edmund Pettus Bridge appeared on the front page of newspapers and news magazines around the world. Another marcher, Lynda Blackmon Lowery, age 14, was brutally beaten by a police officer during the march, and needed seven stitches for a cut above her right eye and 28 stitches on the back of her head. John Lewis suffered a skull fracture and bore scars on his head from the incident for the rest of his life. In all, 17 marchers were hospitalized and 50 treated for lesser injuries; the day soon became known as "Bloody Sunday".

=== Response to "Bloody Sunday" ===
After the march, President Johnson issued an immediate statement "deploring the brutality with which a number of Negro citizens of Alabama were treated". He also promised to send a voting rights bill to Congress that week, although it took him until March 15.

SNCC officially joined the Selma campaign, putting aside their qualms about SCLC's tactics to rally for "the fundamental right of protest". SNCC members independently organized sit-ins in Washington, D.C., the following day, occupying the office of Attorney General Nicholas Katzenbach until they were dragged away.

The executive board of the NAACP unanimously passed a resolution the day after "Bloody Sunday", warning

If Federal troops are not made available to protect the rights of Negroes, then the American people are faced with terrible alternatives. Like the citizens of Nazi-occupied France, Negroes must either submit to the heels of their oppressors or they must organize underground to protect themselves from the oppression of Governor Wallace and his storm troopers.

In response to "Bloody Sunday", labor leader Walter Reuther sent a telegram on March 9 to President Johnson, reading in part:

Americans of all religious faiths, of all political persuasions, and from every section of our Nation are deeply shocked and outraged at the tragic events in Selma Ala., and they look to the Federal Government as the only possible source to protect and guarantee the exercise of constitutional rights, which is being denied and destroyed by the Dallas County law enforcement agents and the Alabama State troops under the direction of Governor George Wallace. Under these circumstances, Mr President, I join in urging you to take immediate and appropriate steps including the use of Federal marshals and troops if necessary, so that the full exercise of constitutional rights including free assembly and free speech be fully protected.

Wallace characterized protests as "continued agitation and demonstrations led and directed by outsiders."

== Second march: "Turnaround Tuesday" ==
Bevel, King, Nash, and others began organizing a second march to be held on Tuesday, March 9, 1965. They issued a call for clergy and citizens from across the country to join them. Awakened to issues of civil and voting rights by years of Civil Rights Movement activities, and shocked by the television images of "Bloody Sunday", hundreds of people responded to SCLC's call.

To prevent another outbreak of violence, SCLC attempted to gain a court order that would prohibit the police from interfering. Instead of issuing the court order, U.S. district court judge Frank Minis Johnson issued a restraining order, prohibiting the march from taking place until he could hold additional hearings later in the week.

Based on past experience, some in SCLC were confident that Judge Johnson would eventually lift the restraining order. They did not want to alienate one of the few southern judges who had displayed sympathy to their cause by violating his injunction. In addition, they did not yet have sufficient infrastructure in place to support the long march, one for which the marchers were ill-equipped. They knew that violating a court order could result in punishment for contempt, even if the order were later reversed. But some movement activists, both local and from around the country, were determined to march on Tuesday to protest both the "Bloody Sunday" violence and the systematic denial of black voting rights in Alabama. Both Hosea Williams and James Forman argued that the march must proceed and by the early morning of the march date, and after much debate, King had decided to lead people to Montgomery.

Assistant Attorney General John Doar and former Florida governor LeRoy Collins, representing President Lyndon Johnson, went to Selma to meet with King and others at Richie Jean Jackson's house and privately urged King to postpone the march. The SCLC president told them that his conscience demanded that he proceed, and that many movement supporters, especially in SNCC, would go ahead with the march even if he told them it should be called off. Collins suggested to King that he make a symbolic witness at the bridge, then turn around and lead the marchers back to Selma. King told them that he would try to enact the plan provided that Collins could ensure that law enforcement would not attack them. Collins obtained this guarantee from Sheriff Clark and Al Lingo in exchange for a guarantee that King would follow a precise route drawn up by Clark.

On the morning of March 9, a day that would become known as "Turnaround Tuesday", Collins handed King the secretly agreed route. King led about 2,500 marchers out on the Edmund Pettus Bridge and held a short prayer session before turning them around, thereby obeying the court order preventing them from making the full march, and following the agreement made by Collins, Lingo, and Clark. He did not venture across the border into the unincorporated area of the county, even though the police unexpectedly stood aside to let them enter.

As only SCLC leaders had been told in advance of the plan, many marchers felt confusion and consternation, including those who had traveled long distances to participate and oppose police brutality. King asked them to remain in Selma for another march to take place after the injunction was lifted.

That evening, three white Unitarian Universalist ministers in Selma for the march were attacked on the street and beaten with clubs by four KKK members. The worst injured was James Reeb from Boston. Fearing that Selma's public hospital would refuse to treat Reeb, activists took him to Birmingham's University Hospital, two hours away. Reeb died on Thursday, March 11 at University Hospital, with his wife by his side.

=== Response to the second march ===
James Reeb's death provoked mourning throughout the country, and tens of thousands held vigils in his honor. President Johnson called Reeb's widow and father to express his condolences (he would later invoke Reeb's memory when he delivered a draft of the Voting Rights Act to Congress).

Blacks in Dallas County and the Black Belt mourned the death of Reeb, as they had earlier mourned the death of Jimmie Lee Jackson. But many activists were bitter that the media and national political leaders expressed great concern over the murder of Reeb, a northern white in Selma, but had paid scant attention to that of Jackson, a local African American. SNCC organizer Stokely Carmichael argued that "the movement itself is playing into the hands of racism, because what you want as a nation is to be upset when anybody is killed [but] for it to be recognized, a white person must be killed. Well, what are you saying?"

King's credibility in the movement was shaken by the secret turnaround agreement. David Garrow notes that King publicly "waffled and dissembled" on how his final decision had been made. On some occasions King would inaccurately claim that "no pre-arranged agreement existed", but under oath before Judge Johnson, he acknowledged that there had been a "tacit agreement". Criticism of King by radicals in the movement became increasingly pronounced, with James Forman calling Turnaround Tuesday, "a classic example of trickery against the people".

==== James Reeb's memorial service ====
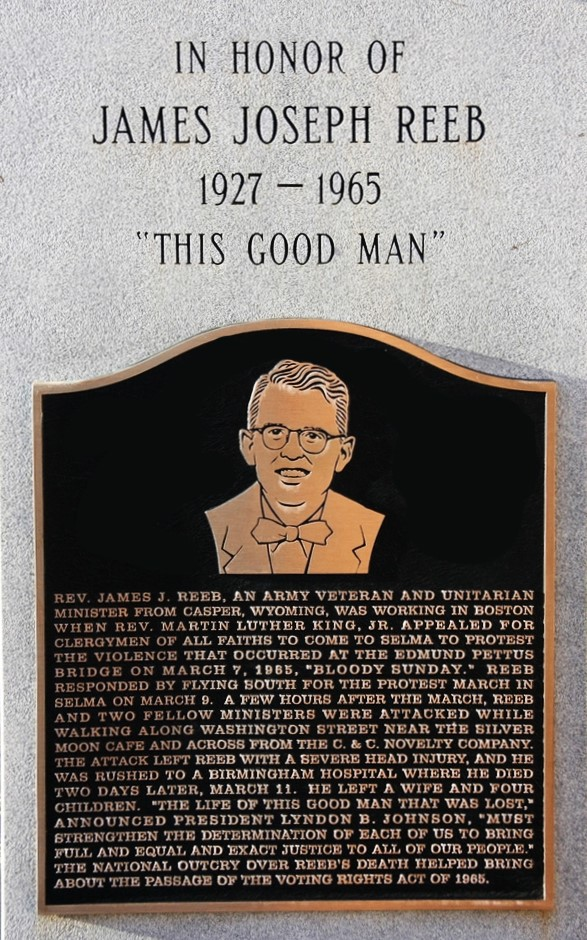
Monument for James Reeb in Selma, Alabama

Following the death of James Reeb, a memorial service was held at the Brown's Chapel AME Church on March 15, 1965. Among those who addressed the packed congregation were King, labor leader Walter Reuther, and some clergymen. A picture of King, Reuther, Greek Orthodox Archbishop Iakovos and others in Selma for Reeb's memorial service appeared on the cover of Life magazine on March 26, 1965. After the memorial service, upon getting permission from the courts, the leaders and attendees marched from the Brown's Chapel AME Church to the Dallas County Courthouse in Selma.

==== Actions in Montgomery ====
With the second march turned and its organizers awaiting a judicial order to safely proceed, Tuskegee Institute students, led by Gwen Patton and Sammy Younge Jr., decided to open a "Second Front" by marching to the Alabama State Capitol and delivering a petition to Governor Wallace. They were quickly joined by James Forman and much of the SNCC staff from Selma. The SNCC members distrusted King more than ever after the "turnaround", and were eager to take a separate course. On March 11, SNCC began a series of demonstrations in Montgomery, and put out a national call for others to join them. James Bevel, SCLC's Selma leader, followed them and discouraged their activities, bringing him and SCLC into conflict with Forman and SNCC. Bevel accused Forman of trying to divert people from the Selma campaign and of abandoning nonviolent discipline. Forman accused Bevel of driving a wedge between the student movement and the local black churches. The argument was resolved only when both were arrested.

On March 15 and 16, SNCC led several hundred demonstrators, including Alabama students, Northern students, and local adults, in protests near the capitol complex. The Montgomery County sheriff's posse met them on horseback and drove them back, whipping them. Against the objections of James Bevel, some protesters threw bricks and bottles at police. At a mass meeting on the night of the 16th, Forman "whipped the crowd into a frenzy" demanding that the President act to protect demonstrators, and warned, "If we can't sit at the table of democracy, we'll knock the fucking legs off."

The New York Times featured the Montgomery confrontations on the front page the next day. Although King was concerned by Forman's violent rhetoric, he joined him in leading a march of 2000 people in Montgomery to the Montgomery County courthouse.

According to historian Gary May, "City officials, also worried by the violent turn of events ... apologized for the assault on SNCC protesters and invited King and Forman to discuss how to handle future protests in the city." In the negotiations, Montgomery officials agreed to stop using the county posse against protesters, and to issue march permits to blacks for the first time.

Governor Wallace did not negotiate, however. He continued to have state police arrest any demonstrators who ventured onto Alabama State property of the capitol complex.

==== Actions at the White House ====
On March 11, twelve Selma solidarity activists sat-in at the East Wing of the White House until arrested. Dozens of other protesters also tried to occupy the White House that weekend but were stopped by guards; they blocked Pennsylvania Avenue instead. On March 12, President Johnson had an unusually belligerent meeting with a group of civil rights advocates including Bishop Paul Moore, Reverend Robert Spike, and SNCC representative H. Rap Brown. Johnson complained that the White House protests were disturbing his family. The activists were unsympathetic and demanded to know why he hadn't delivered the voting rights bill to Congress yet, or sent federal troops to Alabama to protect the protesters. In this same period, SNCC, CORE, and other groups continued to organize protests in more than eighty cities, actions that included 400 people blocking the entrances and exits of the Los Angeles Federal Building.

President Johnson told the press that he refused to be "blackjacked" into action by unruly "pressure groups". The next day he arranged a personal meeting with Governor Wallace, urging him to use the Alabama National Guard to protect marchers. He also began preparing the final draft of his voting rights bill.

On March 11, Attorney General Katzenbach announced that the federal government was intending to prosecute local and state officials who were responsible for the attacks on the marchers on March 7. He would use an 1870 civil rights law as the basis for charges.

==== Johnson's decision and the Voting Rights Act ====
On March 15, the president convened a joint session of Congress, outlined his new voting rights bill, and demanded that they pass it. In a historic presentation carried nationally on live television, making use of the largest media network, Johnson praised the courage of African-American activists. He called Selma "a turning point in man's unending search for freedom" on a par with the Battle of Appomattox in the American Civil War. Johnson added that his entire Great Society program, not only the voting rights bill, was part of the Civil Rights Movement. He adopted language associated with King, declaring that "it is not just Negroes, but really it is all of us, who must overcome the crippling legacy of bigotry and injustice. And we shall overcome." Afterward, King sent a telegram to Johnson congratulating him for his speech, calling it "the most moving eloquent unequivocal and passionate plea for human rights ever made by any president of this nation". Johnson's voting rights bill was formally introduced in Congress two days later.

== March to Montgomery ==
The third Selma Civil Rights March frontline. From far left: John Lewis, an unidentified nun, Ralph Abernathy, Martin Luther King Jr., Ralph Bunche, Rabbi Abraham Joshua Heschel, Frederick Douglas Reese. Second row: Joseph Ellwanger is standing behind the nun; between King and Bunche is Rabbi Maurice Davis. Heschel later wrote, "When I marched in Selma, my feet were praying."

A week after Reeb's death, on Wednesday March 17, Judge Johnson ruled in favor of the protesters, saying their First Amendment right to march in protest could not be abridged by the state of Alabama:

The law is clear that the right to petition one's government for the redress of grievances may be exercised in large groups . ... These rights may ... be exercised by marching, even along public highways.

Judge Johnson had sympathized with the protesters for some days, but had withheld his order until he received an iron-clad commitment of enforcement from the White House. President Johnson had avoided such a commitment in sensitivity to the power of the state's rights movement, and attempted to cajole Governor Wallace into protecting the marchers himself, or at least giving the president permission to send troops. Finally, seeing that Wallace had no intention of doing either, the president gave his commitment to Judge Johnson on the morning of March 17, and the judge issued his order the same day. To ensure that this march would not be as unsuccessful as the first two marches were, the president federalized the Alabama National Guard on March 20 to escort the march from Selma. The ground operation was supervised by Deputy U.S. Attorney General Ramsey Clark. He also sent Joseph A. Califano Jr., who at the time served as Special Assistant to the Secretary of Defense, to outline the progress of the march. In a series of letters, Califano reported on the march at regular intervals for the four days.

On Sunday, March 21, close to 8,000 people assembled at Brown Chapel A.M.E. Church to commence the trek to Montgomery. Most of the participants were black, but some were white and some were Asian and Latino. Spiritual leaders of multiple races, religions, and creeds marched abreast with King, including Fred Shuttlesworth, Greek Orthodox archbishop Iakovos, Rabbis Abraham Joshua Heschel and Maurice Davis, and at least one nun, all of whom were depicted in a photo that has become famous. The Dutch Catholic priest Henri Nouwen joined the march on March 24.

In 1965, the road to Montgomery was four lanes wide going east from Selma, then narrowed to two lanes through Lowndes County, and widened to four lanes again at the Montgomery county border. Under the terms of Judge Johnson's order, the march was limited to no more than 300 participants for the two days they were on the two-lane portion of US 80. At the end of the first day, most of the marchers returned to Selma by bus and car, leaving 300 to camp overnight and take up the journey the next day.

On March 22 and 23, 300 protesters marched through chilling rain across Lowndes County, camping at three sites in muddy fields. At the time of the march, the population of Lowndes County was 81% black and 19% white, but not a single black was registered to vote. There were 2,240 whites registered to vote in Lowndes County, a figure that represented 118% of the adult white population (in many Southern counties of that era it was common practice to retain white voters on the rolls after they died or moved away). On March 23, Hundreds of black marchers wore kippot, Jewish skullcaps, to emulate the marching rabbis, as Heschel was marching at the front of the crowd. The marchers called the kippot "freedom caps".

On the morning of March 24, the march crossed into Montgomery County and the highway widened again to four lanes. All day as the march approached the city, additional marchers were ferried by bus and car to join the line. By evening, several thousand marchers had reached the final campsite at the City of St. Jude, a complex on the outskirts of Montgomery.

That night on a makeshift stage, a "Stars for Freedom" rally was held, with singers Harry Belafonte, Tony Bennett, Frankie Laine, Peter, Paul and Mary, Sammy Davis Jr., Joan Baez, Nina Simone, and the Chad Mitchell Trio all performing. Thousands more people continued to join the march.

On Thursday, March 25, 25,000 people marched from St. Jude to the steps of the State Capitol Building where King delivered the speech "How Long, Not Long". He said:

The end we seek is a society at peace with itself, a society that can live with its conscience. ... I know you are asking today, How long will it take? I come to say to you this afternoon however difficult the moment, however frustrating the hour, it will not be long.

After delivering the speech, King and the marchers approached the entrance to the capitol with a petition for Governor Wallace. A line of state troopers blocked the door. One announced that the governor was not in. Undeterred, the marchers remained at the entrance until one of Wallace's secretaries appeared and took the petition.

Later that night, Viola Liuzzo, a white mother of five from Detroit who had come to Alabama to support voting rights for blacks, was assassinated by Ku Klux Klan members while she was ferrying marchers back to Selma from Montgomery. Among the Klansmen in the car from which the shots were fired was FBI informant Gary Rowe. Afterward, the FBI's COINTELPRO operation spread false rumors that Liuzzo was a member of the Communist Party and had abandoned her children to have sexual relationships with African-American activists.

Map showing Selma to Montgomery march route in March 1965

=== Response to the third march ===
The third Selma march received national and international coverage. It was reported that it publicized the marchers' message without harassment by police and segregation supporters. Gaining more widespread support from other civil rights organizations in the area, this third march was considered an overall success, with greater degree of influence on the public. Subsequently, voter registration drives were organized in black-majority areas across the South, but it took time to get the target population to sign up.

U.S. representative William Louis Dickinson made two speeches to Congress on March 30 and April 27, saying that there was alcohol abuse, bribery, and widespread sexual license among the marchers. Religious leaders present at the marches denied the allegations, and local and national journalists found no grounds for his accounts. The allegations of segregation supporters were collected in Robert M. Mikell's pro-segregationist book Selma (Charlotte, 1965).

=== Hammermill boycott ===
During 1965, Martin Luther King Jr. was promoting an economic boycott of Alabama products to put pressure on the State to integrate schools and employment. In an action under development for some time, the Hammermill Paper Company announced the opening of a major plant in Selma, Alabama; this came during the height of violence in early 1965. On February 4, 1965, the company announced plans for construction of a $35 million plant, allegedly touting the "fine reports the company had received about the character of the community and its people".

On March 26, 1965, the Student Nonviolent Coordinating Committee called for a national boycott of Hammermill paper products, until the company reversed what SNCC described as racist policies. The SCLC joined in support of the boycott. In cooperation with SCLC, student members of Oberlin College Action for Civil Rights, joined with SCLC members to conduct picketing and a sit-in at Hammermill's Erie, Pennsylvania headquarters. White activist and preacher Robert W. Spike called Hammermill's decision as "an affront not only to 20 million American Negroes, but also to all citizens of goodwill in this country." He also criticized Hammermill executives directly, stating: "For the board chairman of one of America's largest paper manufacturers to sit side by side with Governor Wallace of Alabama and say that Selma is fine ... is either the height of naiveté or the depth of racism."

The company called a meeting of the corporate leadership, SCLC's C. T. Vivian, and Oberlin student leadership. Their discussions led to Hammermill executives signing an agreement to support integration in Alabama. The agreement also required Hammermill to commit to equal pay for black and white workers. During these negotiations, around 50 police officers arrived outside of the Erie headquarters and arrested 65 activists, charging them with obstruction of an officer.

== Aftermath and historical impact ==
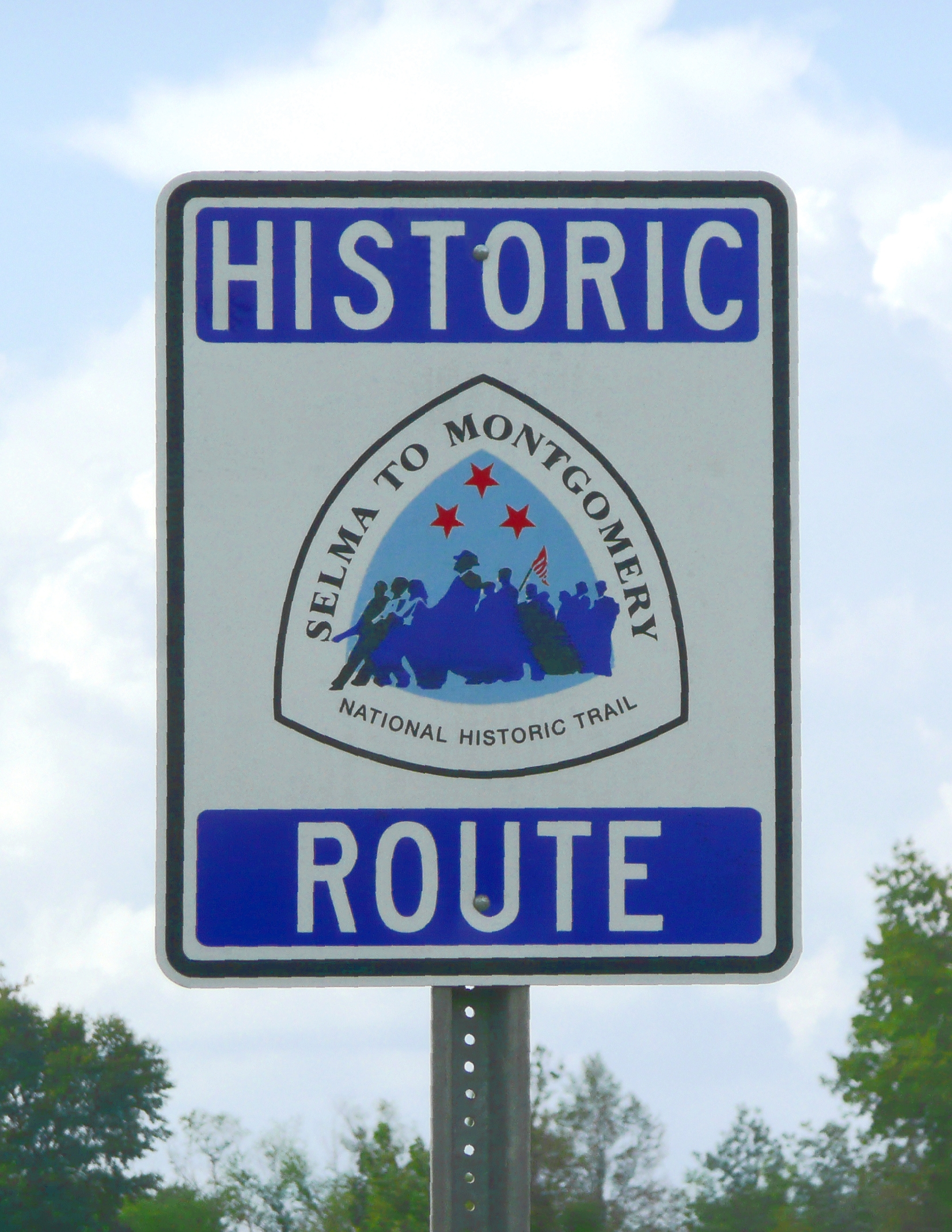
Selma to Montgomery National Historic Trail sign

President Barack Obama's speech marking the 50th anniversary of the Selma to Montgomery marches

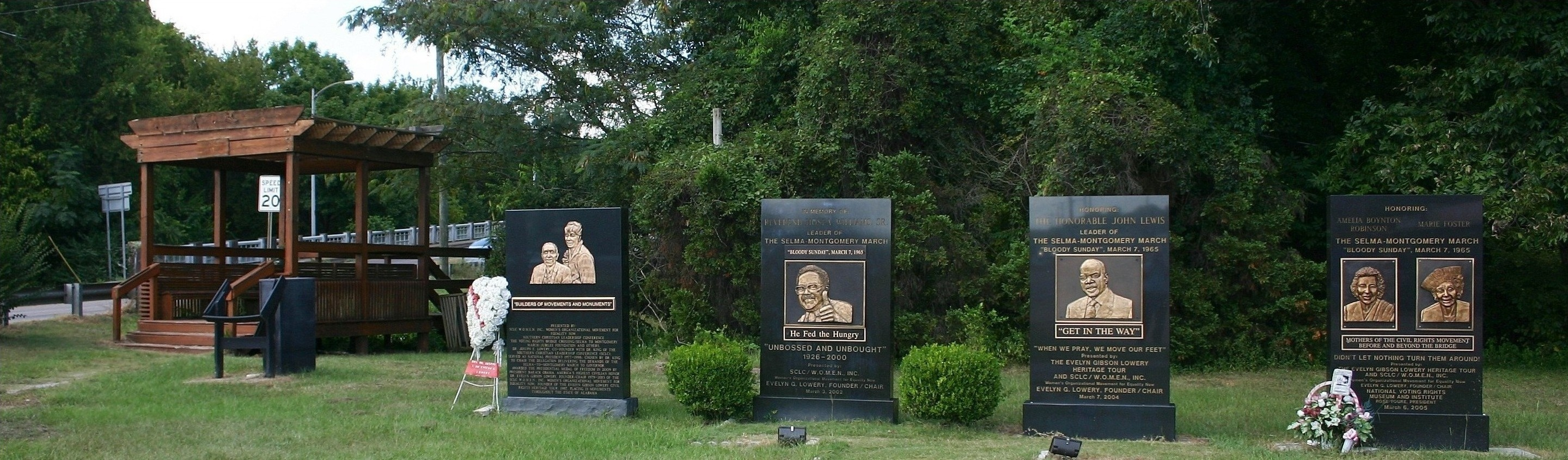
Memorial at Edmund Pettus Bridge in Selma, Alabama

The marches had a powerful effect in Washington. After witnessing TV coverage of "Bloody Sunday", President Lyndon Baines Johnson met with Governor George Wallace in Washington to discuss the civil rights situation in his state. He tried to persuade Wallace to stop the state harassment of the protesters. Two nights later, on March 15, 1965, Johnson presented a bill to a joint session of Congress. The bill was passed that summer and signed by Johnson as the Voting Rights Act on August 6, 1965.

Johnson's televised speech before Congress was carried nationally; it was considered to be a watershed moment for the civil rights movement. He said:

Even if we pass this bill, the battle will not be over. What happened in Selma is part of a far larger movement which reaches into every section and state of America. It is the effort of American Negroes to secure for themselves the full blessings of American life. Their cause must be our cause, too, because it is not just Negroes but really it is all of us who must overcome the crippling legacy of bigotry and injustice. And we shall overcome.

Many in the Civil Rights Movement cheered the speech and were emotionally moved that after so long, and so hard a struggle, a president was finally willing to defend voting rights for blacks. According to C. T. Vivian, an SCLC activist who was with King at Richie Jean Jackson's home when the speech was broadcast

I looked over ... and Martin was very quietly sitting in the chair, and a tear ran down his cheek. It was a victory like none other. It was an affirmation of the movement.

Many others in the movement remained skeptical of the White House, believing that Johnson was culpable for having allowed violence against the movement in the early months of the campaign and was not a reliable supporter. Neither Jimmie Lee Jackson's murderer, nor Reverend Reeb's was ever prosecuted by the federal government. J. L. Chestnut, reflecting the view of many Selma activists, feared that the president had "outfoxed" and "co-opted" King and the SCLC. James Forman quipped that by quoting "We Shall Overcome", Johnson had simply "spoiled a good song". Such grassroots activists were more determined than ever to remain independent in their political organizing.

Before the march to Montgomery concluded, SNCC staffers Stokely Carmichael and Cleveland Sellers committed themselves to registering voters in Lowndes County for the next year. Their efforts resulted in the creation of the Lowndes County Freedom Organization, an independent third party.

The bill was signed by President Johnson in an August 6 ceremony attended by Amelia Boynton and many other civil rights leaders and activists. This act prohibited most of the unfair practices used to prevent blacks from registering to vote, and provided for federal registrars to go to Alabama and other states with a history of voting-related discrimination to ensure that the law was implemented by overseeing registration and elections.

In the early years of the act, overall progress was slow, with local registrars continuing to use their power to deny African Americans voting access. In most Alabama counties, for example, registration continued to be limited to two days per month. The United States Civil Rights Commission acknowledged that "The Attorney General moved slowly in exercising his authority to designate counties for examiners ... he acted only in counties where he had ample evidence to support the belief that there would be intentional and flagrant violation of the Act." Dr. King demanded that federal registrars be sent to every county covered by the Act, but Attorney General Katzenbach refused.

In the summer of 1965, a well-funded SCLC decided to join SNCC and CORE in massive on-the-ground voter registration programs in the South. The Civil Rights Commission described this as a major contribution to expanding black voters in 1965, and the Justice Department acknowledged leaning on the work of "local organizations" in the movement to implement the Act. SCLC and SNCC were temporarily able to mend past differences through collaboration in the Summer Community Organization & Political Education project. Ultimately, their coalition foundered on SCLC's commitment to nonviolence and (at the time) the Democratic Party. Many activists worried that President Johnson still sought to appease Southern whites, and some historians support this view.

By March 1966, nearly 11,000 blacks had registered to vote in Selma, where 12,000 whites were registered. More blacks would register by November, when their goal was to replace county sheriff Jim Clark; his opponent was Wilson Baker, for whom they had respect. In addition, five blacks ran for office in Dallas County. P. H. Lewis, pastor of Brown Chapel A.M.E. Church, ran for state representative on the Democratic ticket. David Ellwanger, a brother of Joseph Ellwanger of Birmingham, who led supporters in Selma in 1965, challenged incumbent state senator Walter C. Givhan (d. 1976), a fierce segregationist and a power in the state senate. First elected to the state senate in 1954, Givhan retained his seat for six terms, even after redistricting that preceded the 1966 election.

In November 1966, Katzenbach told Johnson regarding Alabama, that "I am attempting to do the least I can do safely without upsetting the civil rights groups." Katzenbach did concentrate examiners and observers in Selma for the "high-visibility" election between incumbent county sheriff Jim Clark and Wilson Baker, who had earned the grudging respect of many local residents and activists. With 11,000 blacks added to the voting rolls in Selma by March 1966, they voted for Baker in 1966, turning Clark out of office. Clark later was prosecuted and convicted of drug smuggling and served a prison sentence. The US Civil Rights Commission said that the murders of activists, such as Jonathan Daniels in 1965, had been a major impediment to voter registration.

Overall, the Justice Department assigned registrars to six of Alabama's 24 Black Belt counties during the late 1960s, and to fewer than one-fifth of all the Southern counties covered by the Act. Expansion of enforcement grew gradually, and the jurisdiction of the Act was expanded through a series of amendments beginning in 1970. An important change was made in 1972, when Congress passed an amendment that discrimination could be determined by "effect" rather than by trying to prove "intent". Thus, if county or local practices resulted in a significant minority population being unable to elect candidates of their choice, the practices were considered to be discriminatory in effect.

In 1960, there were a total of 53,336 black voters registered in the state of Alabama; three decades later, there were 537,285, a tenfold increase.

== Legacy and honors ==
- In 1996, the 54-mile Selma to Montgomery National Historic Trail was designated and is preserved by the National Park Service. As part of the National Historic Trail, the National Park Service operates three interpretive centers (Selma, Lowndes County, and Alabama State University in Montgomery).
- In February 2015, both houses of Congress voted for a resolution to award Congressional Gold Medals to the "foot soldiers" of the Selma campaign. In a later ceremony, two dozen individuals in Selma received certificates. Barack Obama signed the resolution in law on March 7. The award ceremony officially took place on February 24, 2016, at the US Capitol. Surviving marchers John Lewis and Frederick Reese accepted medals on behalf of the Selma marchers.

=== Commemorative marches ===
Since 1965, many marches have commemorated the events of Bloody Sunday, usually held on or around the anniversary of the original event, and currently known as the Selma Bridge Crossing Jubilee. In March 1975, Coretta Scott King, the widow of Martin Luther King Jr., led four thousand marchers commemorating Bloody Sunday. On its 30th anniversary, Rep. John Lewis, former president of Student Nonviolent Coordinating Committee and a prominent activist during the Selma to Montgomery marches, said, "It's gratifying to come back and see the changes that have occurred; to see the number of registered voters and the number of Black elected officials in the state of Alabama to be able to walk with other members of Congress that are African Americans."

On the 40th anniversary of Bloody Sunday, over 10,000 people, including Lewis, again marched across Edmund Pettus Bridge. Also, in 1996, the Olympic torch made its way across the bridge with its carrier, Andrew Young, along with many public officials, to symbolize how far the South has come. When Young spoke at the Brown Chapel A.M.E. Church as part of the torch ceremony, he said, "We couldn't have gone to Atlanta with the Olympic Games if we hadn't come through Selma a long time ago."

In March 2015, on the 50th anniversary of Bloody Sunday, U.S. president Barack Obama, the first African-American U.S. president, delivered a speech at the foot of the bridge and then, along with former U.S. president George W. Bush, Representative John Lewis, and Civil Rights Movement activists such as Amelia Boynton Robinson (at Obama's side in a wheelchair), led a march across the bridge. An estimated 40,000 people attended to commemorate the 1965 march, and to reflect on and speak about its impact on history and continuing efforts to address and improve U.S. civil rights.

After John Lewis died in July 2020, he managed to cross the bridge one last time when his casket, which was carried by a horse-drawn caisson, crossed along the same route he walked during the Bloody Sunday march.

=== Revitalization ===
Montgomery was one of four state capitals chosen for a Greening Americas Capitals Grant, a project of the Partnership for Sustainable Communities between the U.S. Environmental Protection Agency (EPA), the U.S. Department of Housing and Urban Development, and the U.S. Department of Transportation. Beginning in 2011, EPA and community groups developed the study through consultations and a 3-day design workshops, aided by nationally acclaimed urban planners. The Montgomery portion of the Selma to Montgomery trail was being improved through a multimillion-dollar investment to enhance the trail and related neighborhoods. The city chose a section that passes through a "historically significant African-American neighborhood". Projects planned to improve design and sustainability include infill development, resurfacing, pedestrian improvements, environmental improvements including new trees and green-screens, and drainage improvements. In addition, many information panels have been installed, as well as several permanent public art displays that are tied to the march.

The work in Montgomery is related to a larger multi-agency effort since 2009 between the Alabama Department of Environmental Management (ADEM), EPA and the National Park Service to improve areas along the National Historic Voting Rights Trail to enable local communities to thrive. The US 80 corridor has been described in an EPA summary as a "54-mile corridor of high unemployment, health issues, lower educational and economic achievements, and severe rural isolation". Among the serious environmental issues identified by EPA has been the presence of active and abandoned gas stations along the highway, with potential contamination from petroleum leaks from underground storage sites. A site in Montgomery had been identified as a problem, and EPA conducted additional assessments since the beginning of the project. Cleanup of the Montgomery site was scheduled to be completed in 2011. In addition, the agencies have sponsored community engagement to develop plans related to community goals. Since 2010, federal teams have met with community leaders in Selma, Hayneville and Montgomery, the county seats of Dallas, Lowndes and Montgomery counties.

== Representation in media ==
- State of Alabama (1965), a propaganda film made by Keitz & Herndon for the Alabama State Sovereignty Commission (ASSC project)
- Eyes on the Prize (1987) is a 14-hour PBS documentary narrated by Julian Bond and produced by PBS. The sixth episode, "Bridge to Freedom", explores the Selma to Montgomery marches. The series and its producer won six Emmies, the Peabody Award, and the duPont-Columbia Gold Baton award for excellence in journalism, and it was nominated for an Academy Award.
- Selma, Lord, Selma (1999), the first dramatic feature film based on events surrounding the Selma to Montgomery marches, is a Disney made-for-TV movie shown on ABC television. Critical reception varied.
- Selma, a 2014 American film directed by Ava DuVernay, features the historic figures who developed the voting rights campaign in Selma and led the Selma to Montgomery marches. The film starred David Oyelowo as Martin Luther King Jr., Tom Wilkinson as President Lyndon B. Johnson, Common as James Bevel, and Tim Roth as Governor George Wallace. It was nominated for the Academy Award for Best Picture, won for best song, and received highly favorable reviews, despite being criticized for the inaccurate portrayal of President Johnson as obstructing the advancement of civil rights.
- March (2013) is a three-part graphic novel autobiography written by Congressman John Lewis and published by Top Shelf Productions. It begins with his and fellow civil rights activists' beating and gassing at the hands of Alabama state troopers on the Edmund Pettus Bridge. Written by Lewis and his congressional aide, Andrew Aydin, and illustrated by Nate Powell, the first book in the series was published in August 2013.
- Steadfast Stride Toward Justice (2024) is a sculpture installed in Montgomery, Alabama, that depicts John Lewis as he appeared during the marches.

== See also ==
- Bloody Tuesday (1964)
- Great Pilgrimage, 1913 suffrage march in the UK
- James Karales (major photographer of the march)
- Mud March, 1907 suffrage procession in London
- National Voting Rights Museum
- Padayatra
- Patricia McCann, an activist nun
- Silent Sentinels, 1917 to 1919 protest in Washington, D.C.
- James "Spider" Martin ("Bloody Sunday" photographer)
- Suffrage Hikes, 1912 to 1914 in the US
- Woman Suffrage Procession, 1913 suffrage march in Washington, D.C.
- Women's Coronation Procession, 1911 suffrage march in London
- Women's Sunday, 1908 suffrage march and rally in London
