= Hunger Task Force, Inc. =

- Formation: 1974
- Type: Non-profit
- Headquarters: Milwaukee, Wisconsin
- Region served: Milwaukee County, Wisconsin
- Members: 80 local charities
- Executive Director: Sherrie Tussler
- Website: http://www.hungertaskforce.org

Hunger Task Force, Inc. is a non-profit, anti-hunger public policy organization in Milwaukee, Wisconsin. Hunger Task Force works to end hunger in Milwaukee County, Wisconsin by providing direct food delivery services, and works to end future hunger by advocating for fair and responsible administration of federal nutrition assistance programs.

== History ==
In the 1968, Joe and Joyce Ellwanger ran the Cross Lutheran Church in Milwaukee when they were approached by the Black Panther Party about hosting a free breakfast program for the community's children. The church declined the Panthers request, but were inspired by the idea and recognized the need for such a program at Milwaukee Public Schools. They organized a group - "Citizens for Central School Breakfast Program" - along with former Mayor Frank Zeidler and registered dietitian Mary Kelly, and took a proposal to the Milwaukee School Board in 1969. According to Joe Ellwanger, they were initially met "with all kinds of opposition from a very conservation school board", but were eventually allowed to pilot the program at three MPS schools. The success of the pilot led to board approval at 16 more elementary schools, Kelly went on to directly lead the program, and it was eventually implemented across all MPS schools. In the early 1970s, the United States Department of Agriculture asked the group to expand their work beyond MPS and provide food to low-income families more generally.

In 1977, WISN-TV in Milwaukee organized the Food For Families holiday food drive, and the "task force" was called upon to collect, store and distribute the donated food, creating Milwaukee's first and foremost food bank. Today, Hunger Task Force is a wholly donor driven community institution, and is supported by thousands of volunteers every year.

Hunger Task Force is a member of the Hunger Relief Fund of Wisconsin, a federation of charities dedicated to providing free and nutritious food to low-income families.

The current executive director of Hunger Task Force is Sherrie Tussler.

== Major Activities ==
Hunger Task Force operates as both a food bank and anti-hunger advocacy organization.

=== Food Banking ===
The Hunger Task Force food bank delivers food free of charge to a network of 80 food pantries, soup kitchens and homeless shelters in Milwaukee County. Monthly, these pantries serve over 33,000 people, and meal programs serve over 60,000 meals. Through a combination of federal commodities, donated food and fresh farm produce, Hunger Task Force provides affiliated charities a supply of free, nutritious food appropriate to client household size, diet and culture.

=== Government Commodity Programs ===
Hunger Task Force administers The Emergency Food Assistance Program and the Commodity Supplemental Food Program in Wisconsin.

=== Food Drives ===
Hunger Task Force organizes hundreds of food drives across Milwaukee County every year, including the Food For Families food drive over the holidays, the National Association of Letter Carriers' Stamp Out Hunger food drive, Opening Day at Summerfest and Opening Day at Wisconsin State Fair.

=== Farm and Fish Hatchery ===
Hunger Task Force operates a 150-acre (0.61 km^{2}) historic work farm in Franklin, Wisconsin. This farm produces 32 types of fruits and vegetables that are delivered free of charge to Hunger Task Force's network of affiliated charities. Over 300,000 pounds of fresh produce are grown and distributed annually. A fish hatchery located on the grounds of the farm also houses over 40,000 bluegill, trout and perch that stock Milwaukee County Parks' lagoons.

=== Child Nutrition Reauthorization Advocacy ===
Hunger Task Force advocates for improvements to the Child Nutrition Reauthorization Act including programs such as the School Breakfast Program, the School lunch program, the Summer Food Service Program, the Child and Adult Care Food Program and the Women Infants and Children Program (WIC).

=== Summer Meals Program ===
Hunger Task Force administers a summer meals program in Milwaukee County through the Food and Nutrition Service's Summer Food Service Program that provides three free meals a day to children in need. In 2009, over 1.5 million meals were served at 198 sites across Milwaukee County.

=== Universal Free Breakfast in the Classroom Program ===
Hunger Task Force successfully advocated for a Universal Free Breakfast in the Classroom program in Milwaukee Public Schools in 2005. This program has grown from a six school pilot project to include 85 schools within Milwaukee Public Schools.

=== FoodShare Advocacy ===
Hunger Task Force advocates for Modernization of the Supplemental Nutrition Assistance Program, known in Wisconsin as FoodShare. Hunger Task Force staff teach clients to apply for FoodShare benefits at Milwaukee welfare offices through a website called ACCESS.

=== Research, Education and Organizing ===
Hunger Task Force continually conducts research on poverty and hunger in Milwaukee County. Data generated from published reports informs both food banking services and advocacy strategies. Hunger Task Force educates the public on issues of hunger through educational presentations and hunger simulations. Hunger Task Force organizes community-wide collaborations and recruits volunteers to run programs and to participate in advocacy activities.

=== Volunteerism ===
As of 2010, about 4,000 volunteers supported Hunger Task Force. The organization has 65 employees and, as of 2010, manages roughly $12 million in donations. Volunteers help run major food drives, sort food at the Hunger Task Force warehouse and participate in outreach and advocacy activities. Hunger Task Force organizes "Voices Against Hunger," a volunteer citizen outreach group that advocates for effective anti-hunger public policy. Members of "Voices Against Hunger" contact elected officials and attend public meetings and hearings.
