= J. L. Chestnut Jr. =

American activist (1930–2008)

- Born: December 16, 1930; Selma, Alabama
- Died: September 30, 2008 (aged 77); Birmingham, Alabama
- Occupation(s): Author, attorney, civil rights activist

J. L. Chestnut Jr. (December 16, 1930 – September 30, 2008) was an author, attorney, and a figure in the Civil Rights Movement. He was the first African-American attorney in Selma, Alabama, and the author of the 1991 autobiographical book, Black in Selma: The Uncommon Life of J.L. Chestnut, Jr., which chronicles the history of the Selma Voting Rights Movement, including the 1965 Selma to Montgomery marches and Bloody Sunday.

Chestnut was born in Selma, and attended Howard University Law School. He returned home as Selma's only black attorney, and represented civil rights demonstrators at trial there when the Selma Movement began in the 1960s.

== Early life and education ==
J. L. Chestnut Jr., born in Selma, Alabama, was the son of J. L. Chestnut Sr., who owned a grocery store. His mother was an elementary school teacher. His father was forced to shut down his grocery store due to an accumulation of unpaid taxes.

When he was young, he had a mentor named John F. Sheilds, who was an elementary school teacher. Shields advised him to "go get a law degree and fight the system." He said this because Chestnut Jr. expressed frustration with outdated textbooks and the differences in different institutions due to segregation and discrimination.

In 1953, Chestnut obtained his undergraduate degree at Dillard University in New Orleans. Here he earned a bachelor's degree in Business Administration. Shortly after, he attended law school at Howard University, located in Washington, D.C. His practices were heavily influenced by the work of Thurgood Marshall and other accomplished civil rights leaders.

== Career ==
Chestnut was the first African American lawyer in Selma, Alabama. He was well known for being an attorney for Martin Luther King Jr. and other respected civil rights leaders in the 1960s among civil rights protest, speeches, and marches. He was a major contributor that helped lead change for African Americans. He made advancements for African Americans voting rights and integration into law professions.

On March 7, 1965, nonviolent activists gathered protesters at Edmund Pettus Bridge in Selma to march together to Montgomery. This march was to bring awareness and recognition to the discrimination, segregation and neglection of African American and other minority citizen, exercising their right to vote and be heard. Alabama state troopers attacked these civil-rights protesters, physically beating them, and using tear gas. This day is known as Bloody Sunday and is a major landmark for the civil rights movement. The event was nationally televised and spread awareness around the United States, igniting change. The widespread support from the nation provoked congress to act, and a few months later in August, the 1965 Voting Rights Act was passed.

In 1986, Chestnut was one of the founders of the New South Coalition, along with Birmingham, Alabama Mayor Richard Arrington, when the Alabama Democratic Party refused to endorse Jesse Jackson for the Democratic presidential nomination.

In 1994, Chestnut was active in protesting the jailing of political activist Lyndon LaRouche. He was interviewed in the Tuscaloosa News saying that when he met LaRouche, "I told him that he might as well be black and in Alabama."

== Personal life and death ==
He was married to Vivian Chestnut of Selma. They were married for 56 years and had six children before Chestnut Jr. died.

Chestnut died on September 30, 2008, at St. Vincent's Hospital located in Birmingham, Alabama. He died as the result of an infection that subsequently developed after a surgery he had, causing his kidneys to fail. He died at the age of 77. His illness lasted several months in a hospital in Alabama.
