= Boycott (2001 film) =

2001 television film directed by Clark Johnson

- Written by: Stewart Burns; Herman Daniel Farrell
- Directed by: Clark Johnson
- Starring: Jeffrey Wright; Carmen Ejogo; Terrence Howard
- Music by: Joseph Vitarelli
- Country of origin: United States
- Original language: English

Production
- Producer: Preston Holme
- Cinematography: David Hennings
- Editor: Cindy Mollo
- Running time: 118 minutes
- Production company: HBO Films

Original release
- Network: HBO
- Release: February 24, 2001

Boycott is a 2001 American made-for-television biographical drama film directed by Clark Johnson, and starring Jeffrey Wright as Martin Luther King Jr. The film, based on the book Daybreak of Freedom by Stewart Burns, tells the story of the 1955–1956 Montgomery bus boycott. It won a Peabody Award in 2001 "for refusing to allow history to slip into 'the past.'"

== Plot ==
Set against the backdrop of the 1955 Montgomery Bus Boycott, the story traces the lives of several African-Americans who decide to boycott travelling in the public buses.

== Cast ==
- Jeffrey Wright as Martin Luther King Jr.
- Terrence Howard as Ralph Abernathy
- CCH Pounder as Jo Ann Robinson
- Carmen Ejogo as Coretta Scott King
- Reg E. Cathey as E. D. Nixon
- Brent Jennings as Rufus Lewis
- Iris Little Thomas as Rosa Parks
- Shawn Michael Howard as Fred Gray
- Erik Dellums as Bayard Rustin

== Soundtrack ==
The film soundtrack was issued as a 3-disc CD album on the EMI Gospel label and features recordings by Nat King Cole, Dizzy Gillespie, Kirk Franklin and The Nu Nation, Montrel Darrett, Darwin T. Hobbs & Molly Johnson, Beverly Crawford and The Potters House Choir, the Tri-City Singers, Aaron Neville with Sweet Honey in the Rock, Lamar Campbell and The Spirit of Praise, Karen Clark, and BeBe Winans with Stevie Wonder & Mario Winans.

Reviewing the album for AllMusic, Jonathan Widran said: "This exciting, eclectic R&B-driven soundtrack to the HBO film features a mix of classic jazz performances and some of the best sounds coming out of modern pop-gospel music these days."

== See also ==
- Browder v. Gayle
- Civil rights movement in popular culture
- Claudette Colvin
- Selma, another film starring Ejogo as Scott King
