= Fred Gray (attorney) =

American attorney and activist (born 1930)

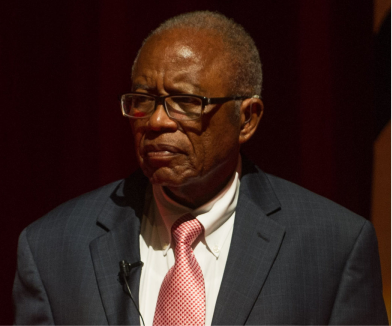
- Gray speaking at Emporia State University on September 15, 2016

Member of the Alabama House of Representatives
- In office 1971–1974

Personal details
- Born: Fred David Gray; December 14, 1930 (age 95) Montgomery, Alabama, U.S.
- Spouse: Bernice Hill (m. 1955)
- Children: 4
- Education: Alabama State College (BA); Case Western Reserve University (JD)
- Occupation: Lawyer
- Awards: Presidential Medal of Freedom (2022)

Fred David Gray (born December 14, 1930) is an American civil rights attorney, preacher, activist, and state legislator from Alabama. He handled many prominent civil rights cases, such as Browder v. Gayle, and was elected to the Alabama House of Representatives in 1970, along with Thomas Reed, both from Tuskegee. They were the first black state legislators in Alabama in the 20th century. He served as the president of the National Bar Association in 1985, and in 2001 was elected as the first African-American President of the Alabama State Bar.

== Early life ==
Born in Montgomery, Alabama, Gray attended the Loveless School, where his aunt taught, until the seventh grade. He attended the Nashville Christian Institute (NCI), a boarding school operated by the Churches of Christ, where he assisted NCI president and noted preacher Marshall Keeble in visiting other churches of the racially diverse nondenominational fellowship. After graduation, Gray matriculated at Alabama State College for Negroes, and received a baccalaureate degree in 1951. Encouraged by a teacher to apply to law school despite his earlier plans to become an historian and preacher, Gray moved to Cleveland, Ohio, and received a juris doctor degree from Case Western Reserve University School of Law in 1954. At the time there was no law school in Alabama that would accept African Americans.

After passing the bar examination, Gray returned to his home town and established a law office. He also began preaching at the Holt Street Church of Christ, where his parents had long been devout members.

== Career as a preacher ==
In 1957, Gray fulfilled his mother's dream by becoming a preacher in Churches of Christ. In 1974, he helped merge white and black congregations in Tuskegee, Alabama, where he had moved. Gray also served on the board of trustees for Southwestern Christian College, a historically black college near Dallas, Texas affiliated with the Churches of Christ. In 2012 Lipscomb University in Nashville, Tennessee, also affiliated with the Churches of Christ bestowed a doctorate of humane letters honoris causa upon Gray in 2012. Gray once challenged Lipscomb's segregation practices.

== Civil Rights Movement ==
During the Civil Rights Movement, Gray came to prominence working with Martin Luther King Jr. and E.D. Nixon, among others. In some of his first cases as a young Alabama attorney (and solo practitioner), Gray defended Claudette Colvin and later Rosa Parks, who were charged with disorderly conduct for refusing to seat themselves in the rear of segregated city buses.

After Alabama Attorney General John Malcolm Patterson effectively prohibited the NAACP from operating in Alabama in 1956, Gray provided legal counsel for eight years (including three trips through the state court system and two through federal courts) until the organization was permitted to operate in the state. He also successfully defended Martin Luther King Jr. from charges of tax evasion in 1960, winning an acquittal from an all-white jury.

Other notable civil rights cases brought and argued by Gray included Dixon v. Alabama (1961, which established due process rights for students at public universities), Gomillion v. Lightfoot (1962, which overturned state redistricting of Tuskegee that excluded most of the majority-black residents; this contributed to laying a foundation for "one man, one vote") and Williams v. Wallace (1963, which protected the Selma to Montgomery marchers). In another Supreme Court case, Gray was driven in his efforts to have the NAACP organize in Alabama after the group was forbidden in the state.

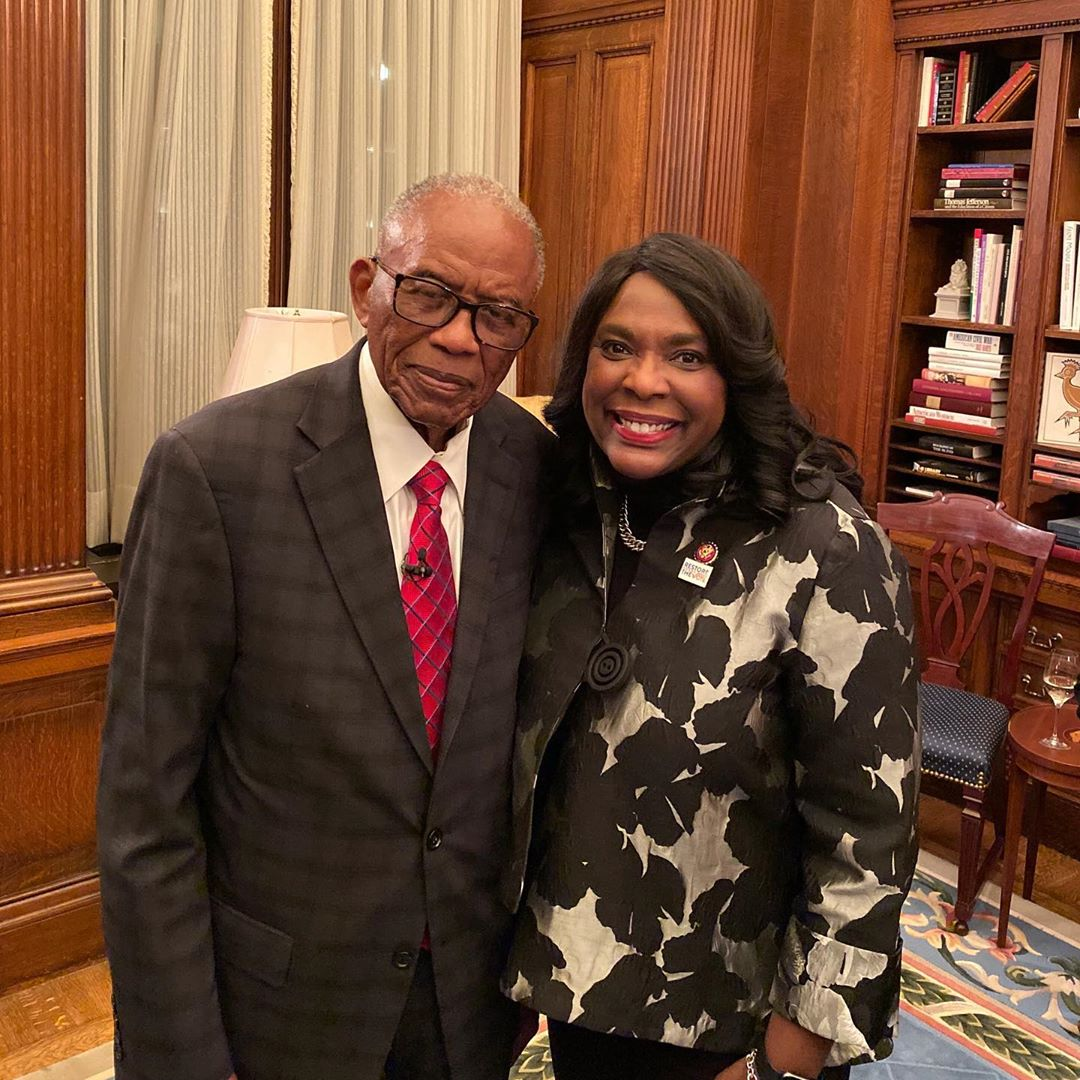
Fred Gray at an exhibition opening about Rosa Parks at the Library of Congress with Terri Sewell in 2019.

Alabama resisted integration of public schools following the U.S. Supreme Court's decision in Brown v. Board of Education (1954) that ruled segregation of public schools was unconstitutional. Gray successfully represented Vivian Malone and James Hood, who had been denied admission to the University of Alabama, and they entered the university despite Governor George Wallace's Stand in the Schoolhouse Door incident. In 1963 Gray successfully sued Florence State University (now University of North Alabama) on behalf of Wendell Wilkie Gunn, who had been denied admission based on race. Gray also led the successful effort to desegregate Auburn University. In 1963 Gray filed the Lee v. Macon County Board of Education case, which in 1967 led a three-judge panel of U.S. District Judges to order all Alabama public schools not already subject to court orders to desegregate. Lawsuits filed by Gray helped desegregate more than 100 local school systems, as well as all public colleges and universities in his home state.

In 1970, Gray, along with Thomas J. Reed, became the first African Americans elected as legislators in Alabama since Reconstruction. Gray's district included Tuskegee and parts of Barbour, Bullock, and Macon counties.

Gray's autobiography, Bus Ride to Justice, was published in 1994, and a revised edition in 2012.

On December 18, 2024, a portrait of Fred Gray, created by artist Michael Shane Neal, was unveiled at the National Portrait Gallery in Washington, DC, where it has since been included in the gallery's permanent collection.

== Browder v. Gayle ==
Browder v. Gayle was a court case heard before a three-judge panel of the United States District Court for the Middle District of Alabama on Montgomery and Alabama state bus segregation laws. The panel consisted of Middle District of Alabama Judge Frank Minis Johnson, Northern District of Alabama Judge Seybourn Harris Lynne, and the fifth Circuit Court of Appeals Judge Richard Rives. On June 5, 1956, the District Court Ruled 2–1, with Lynne dissenting, that bus segregation is unconstitutional under the Equal Protection Clause of the Fourteenth Amendment to the United States Constitution to the U.S. Constitution.

Later the state and city would appeal the decision, which later went to the Supreme Court on November 13, 1956. A motion of clarification and the rehearing of the case was later declined on December 17, 1956.

Shortly after the beginning of the Montgomery Bus Boycott in December 1955, many black community leaders were discussing whether they would file a federal lawsuit to try to challenge the City of Montgomery and Alabama about the bus segregation laws.

About two months after the bus boycott began, civil rights activists reconsidered the case of Claudette Colvin. She was a 15-year-old who had been the first person arrested in 1955 for refusing to give up her seat on a Montgomery bus, nine months prior to Rosa Parks's actions. Fred Gray, E. D. Nixon, president of the NAACP and secretary of the new Montgomery Improvement Association: and Clifford Durr (a white lawyer who, with his wife, Virginia Foster Durr was an activist in the Civil Rights Movement) searched for the ideal case law to challenge the constitutional legitimacy of the Montgomery and Alabama bus segregation laws.

Gray later did research for the lawsuit and consulted with NAACP Legal Defense Fund attorneys Robert L. Carter and Thurgood Marshall (who would late become United States Solicitor General and the first African-American United States Supreme Court Justice). Gray later approached Claudette Colvin, Aurelia Browder, Susie McDonald, Mary Louise Smith, and Jeanetta Reese, all women who had been discriminated against by the drivers enforcing segregation policy in the Montgomery bus system. They all agreed to become plaintiffs in the federal lawsuit (except Jeanetta Reese due to intimidation by the members of the white community), thus bypassing the Alabama court system. Jeanetta Reese later falsely claimed she did not agree to the lawsuit which made the lawsuit an unsuccessful attempt to disbar Gray for supposedly improperly representing her.

On many occasions, Gray stated that he selected Aurelia Browder to be the case's lead defendant because he was convinced that she could carry this responsibility, stating things such as “I chose her because she was a matured person, and I thought she would make an excellent first witness if I needed to put someone on (the witness stand)."

== Tuskegee experiment lawsuit ==
Gray also represented plaintiffs in the class-action lawsuit about the controversial federal Tuskegee Syphilis Study (1932–1972). During the Great Depression, the study was changed to review untreated syphilis in rural African-American male subjects, who thought they were receiving free health care and funeral benefits. Gray filed the case, Pollard v. U.S. Public Health Service, in 1972, after a whistleblower reported the abuses to the Washington Star and The New York Times, which investigated further and published stories. In 1975, Gray achieved a successful settlement for $10 million and medical treatment for those 72 subjects still living of the original 399. (Penicillin had become a standard treatment by 1947, although research subjects were specifically denied that treatment as well as their true diagnosis.) The 40 subsequently infected spouses and 19 congenitally infected children were compensated with medical, health and burial benefits managed by the USPHS's Centers for Disease Control and Prevention (CDC) several years later.

As a result of the lawsuit and settlement, the 1979 Belmont Report was prepared and Congress passed federal laws. These were implemented by establishing Institutional Review Boards for the protection of human research subjects and the National Commission for the Protection of Human Subjects of Biomedical and Behavioral Research within the Department of Health, Education and Welfare, now the Office for Human Research Protections (OHRP) in the Department of Health and Human Services.

In 1997, Gray founded (and subsequently served as president and board member of) the Tuskegee History Center. This nonprofit corporation operates a museum and offers educational resources concerning the Tuskegee Syphilis Study, as well as contributions made by various ethnic groups in the fields of human and civil rights.

== Judicial nomination ==
On January 10, 1980, President Carter nominated Gray to be a judge on the United States District Court for the Middle District of Alabama, to fill a vacancy created by Judge Frank Minis Johnson's elevation to what then was the United States Court of Appeals for the Fifth Circuit. Gray later asked his nomination be withdrawn, as happened on September 17, 1980; President Carter instead nominated Myron Herbert Thompson to that seat.

== Personal life ==
Gray married the former Bernice Hill, his secretary, in 1955, and they had four children. He published his autobiography in 1995, Bus Ride to Justice: The Life and Works of Fred Gray. He is also a member of Omega Psi Phi and Sigma Pi Phi.

== Awards ==
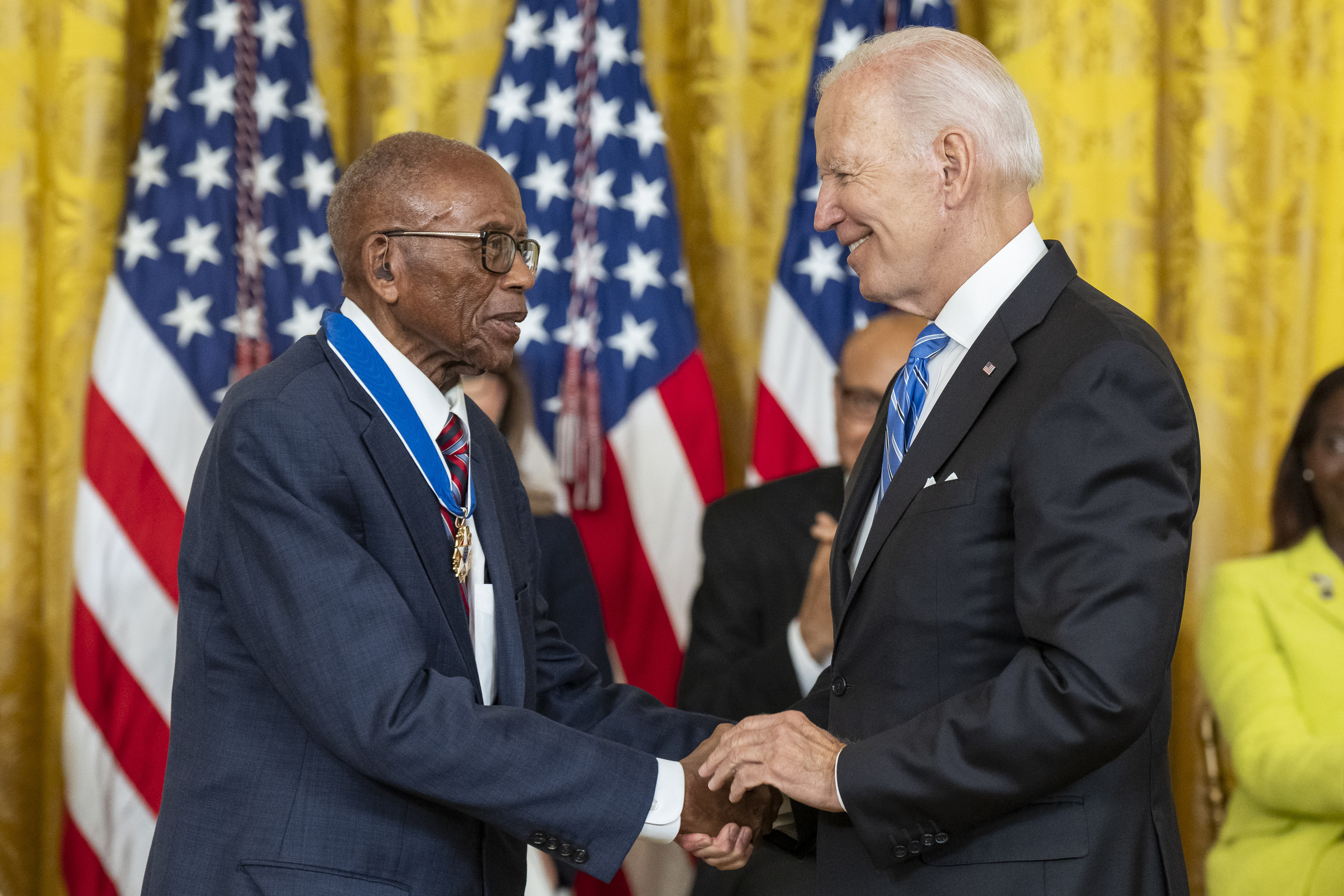
Gray awarded the Presidential Medal of Freedom by President Joe Biden in July 2022

In 1980, the Southern Christian Leadership Conference awarded Gray its Drum Major Award. In 1996, the American Bar Association awarded Gray its Spirit of Excellence Award (having awarded him its Equal Justice Award in 1977). The National Bar Association awarded him its C. Frances Stradford Award. In 2002, Gray became the first African-American president of the Alabama Bar Association. In 2006, the NAACP recognized Gray's accomplishments with the William Robert Ming Advocacy Award, citing the spirit of financial and personal sacrifice displayed in his legal work.

Gray's hometown of Montgomery renamed the street he grew up on after him in 2021. The street was previously named Jefferson Davis Avenue, so the change is a potential violation of the Alabama Memorial Preservation Act.

In 2022, the University of Alabama School of Law and Princeton University awarded Gray honorary doctorates. President Joe Biden presented Gray with the Presidential Medal of Freedom on July 7, 2022.

In 2025, the Alabama State Bar unveiled a life-size bronze statue of Gray, by Steven Whyte. The statue features Gray seated on an Alabama-sourced limestone bench, holding a legal folio engraved with the words “Lawyers Render Service” – a phrase he coined during his term as president of the Alabama State Bar in 2002. That phrase has since become the Bar's official motto, capturing Gray's lifelong belief that lawyers are meant to serve.

== In popular culture ==
Gray is portrayed by Cuba Gooding, Jr. in the 2014 film Selma, which dramatizes the Selma to Montgomery marches and Gray's argument before Judge Frank Johnson that the march should be allowed to go forward.

Shawn Michael Howard portrays Gray in the 2001 film Boycott, in which Gray, himself, plays a cameo role as a supporter of Martin Luther King Jr.

Gray was portrayed by London Carlisle in the 2016 stage play The Integration of Tuskegee High School. The production premiered at Auburn University, was written and directed by Tessa Carr, and dramatizes Gray's involvement in the case of Lee v. Macon County Board of Education.

Gray is portrayed by Aki Omoshaybi in a 2018 episode of Doctor Who, "Rosa".
