= Montgomery Improvement Association =

Civil society organization

The Montgomery Improvement Association (MIA) was an organization formed on December 5, 1955, by black ministers and community leaders in Montgomery, Alabama. Under the leadership of Ralph Abernathy, Martin Luther King Jr. and Edgar Nixon, the MIA was instrumental in guiding the Montgomery bus boycott by setting up the car pool system that would sustain the boycott, negotiating settlements with Montgomery city officials, and teaching nonviolence classes to prepare the African American community to integrate the buses. Thus, though the organization and the boycott itself almost disbanded due to internal divisions and both legal and violent backlash from the white public, it caused the boycott, a campaign that focused national attention on racial segregation in the South, to be successful and catapulted King into the national spotlight.

== History ==
Following Rosa Parks's arrest on December 1, 1955, for failing to vacate her seat for a white passenger on a Montgomery city bus, Jo Ann Robinson of the Women's Political Council and E. D. Nixon of the National Association for the Advancement of Colored People (NAACP) launched plans for a one-day boycott of Montgomery buses on December 5, 1955, the following Monday. However, according to Robinson, the leaders of the meeting did not immediately select a singular leader for the boycott at that point. Robinson stated that it was not "until Monday afternoon, when the ministers realized that the one day boycott was going to be successful. Then they met again, and Dr. Martin Luther King, Jr., agreed to accept the leadership post."

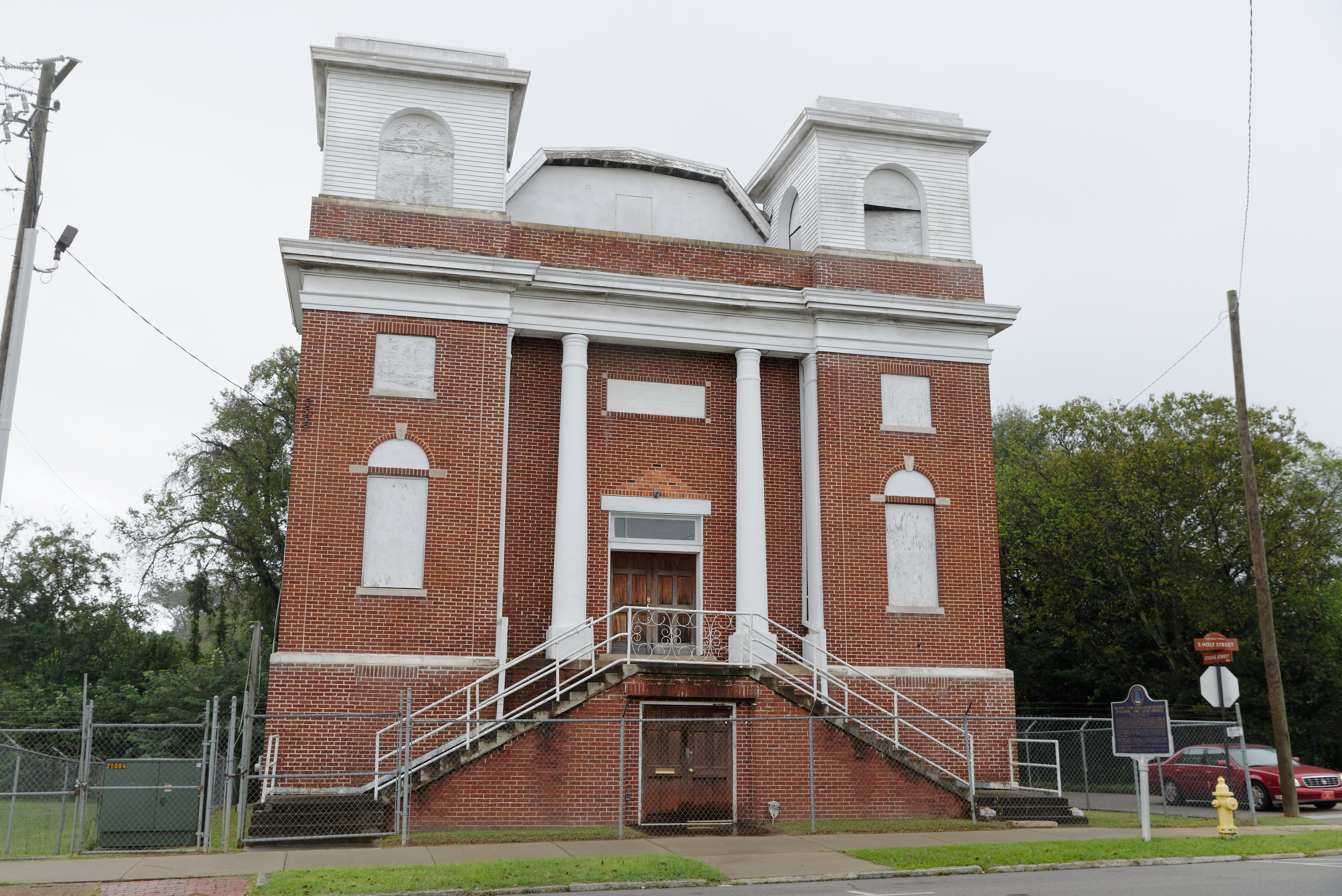
Mount Zion AME Church in Montgomery, Alabama

Since no one knew what to expect, the empty buses were a complete surprise. The success of the boycott on December 5, and the excitement on the mass meeting on the evening of that day, removed any doubt about the strong motivation to continue the boycott. As King put it, "[t]he question of calling off the protest was now academic. The enthusiasm of these thousands of people swept everything along like an onrushing tidal wave." On that Monday afternoon, at a mass meeting at the Mt. Zion A.M.E. Church, the black leadership, consisting of civic and religious leaders of Montgomery, established the Montgomery Improvement Association to oversee the continuation and maintenance of the boycott. However, it was originally named "The Negro Citizen's Council" (this name would later be changed due to its closeness to the white supremacist organizations known as Citizen's Councils). The organization's overall mission extended beyond the boycott campaign, as it sought to "improve the general status of Montgomery, to improve race relations, and to uplift the general tenor of the community."

King, a young minister new to Montgomery, was chosen to lead the MIA at the age of 26. According to Rosa Parks, "Dr. King was chosen in part because he was relatively new to the community and so did not have any enemies." Reverend L. Roy Bennett was also elected to be vice president and E. D. Nixon to be treasurer. The other leadership positions were filled by Reverend E. N. French, Reverend Uriah J. Fields, and Erna Dungee as the organization's corresponding, recording, and financial secretaries respectively. Ralph Abernathy, Jo Ann Robinson, E. D. Nixon, Rufus Lewis and other prominent figures also helped guide the MIA at King's side.

== The Montgomery bus boycott ==
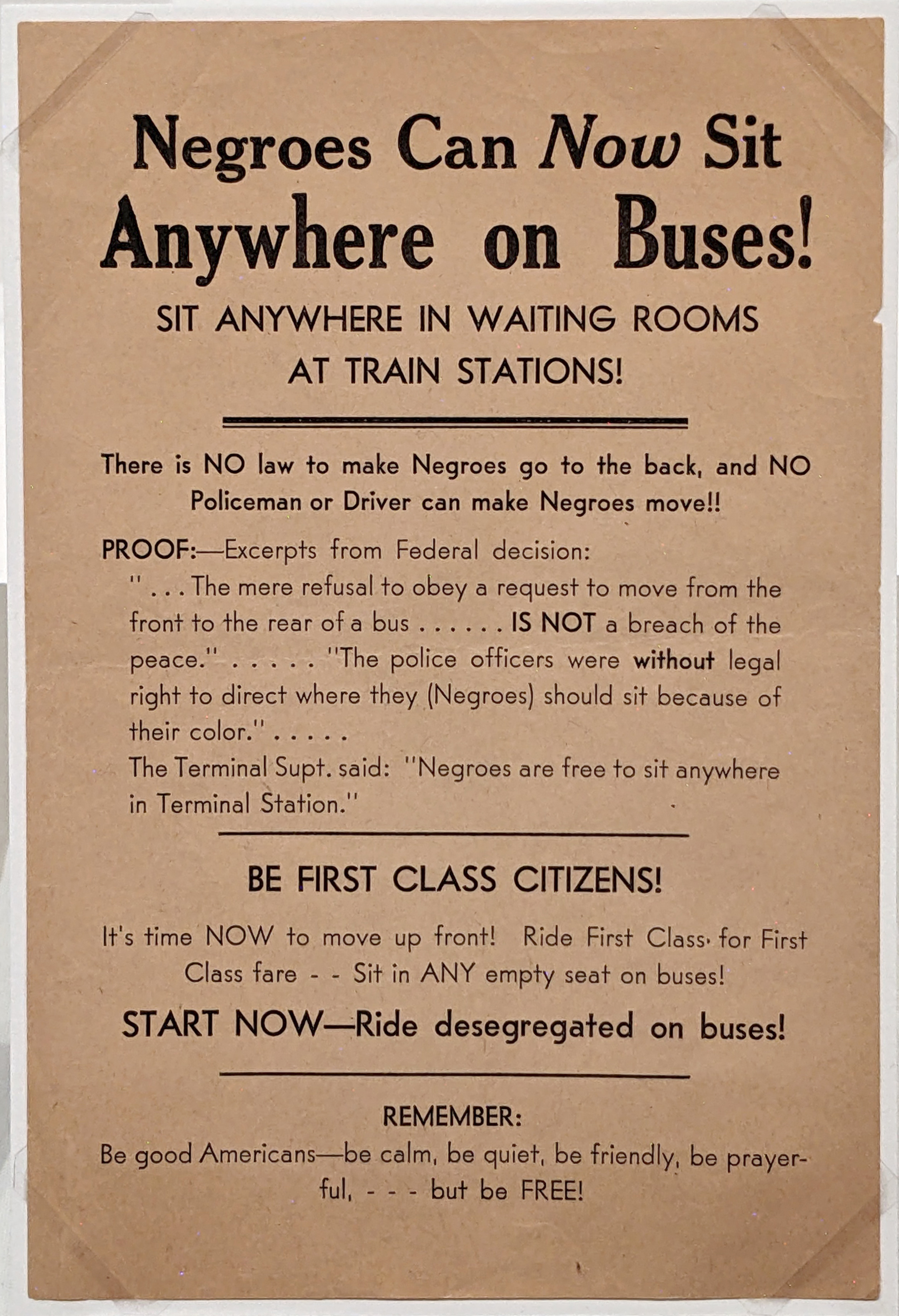
Montgomery Improvement Association flyer advocating for bus desegregation

=== Car Pool System ===
Through 1955 and 1956, the MIA organized car pools and held weekly gatherings with sermons and music to keep the Black community mobilized. The car pool system that the MIA created consisted of three hundred cars that would go to the forty-eight and forty-two zones for dispatch and pickup, respectively, to discreetly shuttle people during five-hour intervals in the morning and evening. The churches and ministers in Montgomery were direct facilitators of this by offering cars, drivers, and places for people to safely wait, but everyday people helped as well by using their own cars to drive the participants around Montgomery. Overall, this system provided the backbone of the boycott by ensuring that the Black public in Montgomery could get to work, school, and errands while still being able to remain off the buses.

=== Funding ===
However, as the car pool became so large, one of the MIA's largest expenses and biggest problems were obtaining money to keep it running. To elongate the system and provide the 17,500 African Americans in Montgomery with transportation, the MIA needed money to buy more cars, pay drivers, buy gas, maintain the vehicles, and pay for any potential tickets. To aid in this, it received funding from many outside sources from national civil rights organizations in the North and South and international groups. This is because, due to a newsletter written and sent out by Jo Ann Robinson, they became heavily interested in the bus boycott and its potential for success. However, the main source of its funding came locally, as the members of the African American community in Montgomery gave money regularly at weekly mass meetings. Other people helped on a slightly larger scale, as Georgia Gilmore and Inez Ricks raised money through their groups known as "The Club from Nowhere" and "The Friendly Club" that sold baked goods to the Black and white populations in the city. These and other organizations were designed for and completely devoted to raising money for the MIA and the Montgomery bus boycott.

=== Negotiations ===
After the MIA's initial meeting on December 5, the executive committee drafted the demands of the boycott and agreed that the campaign would continue until demands were met. Their demands included courteous treatment by bus operators, first-come, first-served seating, and employment of African American bus drivers.

Thus, despite the Supreme Court's decision in Browder v. Gayle, the MIA was initially willing to accept a compromise that was consistent with separate but equal rather than complete integration. In this respect, it followed the pattern of earlier boycott campaigns in the Deep South during the 1950s. A prime example of this was the successful boycott of service stations in Mississippi for refusing to provide restrooms for African Americans. The organizer of that campaign, T.R.M. Howard of the Regional Council of Negro Leadership, had spoken in Montgomery as King's guest at the Dexter Avenue Baptist Church only days before Parks's arrest.

These simple demands were brought by members of the MIA's negotiating committee to a meeting with Montgomery representatives on December 8, yet they were rejected. After the city refused these demands and subsequent meetings on December 17 and 19 came to the same stalemate, the MIA realized that it needed to alter its proposals. The MIA later met with the Men of Montgomery (MOM) on February 8, 1956, and again on the 13th, to attempt to negotiate an end to the boycott. Again, the MIA tried to compromise with the white leaders of Montgomery by amending their demands to ask for reduced bus fare, hiring of African American drivers, and five reserved seats on buses for white people. However, these more moderate demands were rejected by the Montgomery representatives, thus causing the MIA to rethink them. The proposals became more radical after this with the MIA's transportation committee even calling for the creation of its own public transportation system, an idea that would later be refused by Montgomery city officials. Finally, these demands culminated in MIA attorney Fred Gray, along with help from the legal division of the NAACP, issuing Browder v. Gayle, a lawsuit fully challenging the constitutionality of segregation on Montgomery buses.

=== After integration ===
However, though the MIA achieved total desegregation of public transportation in Montgomery, the MIA's leadership of the boycott did not immediately end, as the African American population of Montgomery still had the task of actually integrating the buses. To achieve this, the MIA led nonviolent training sessions in churches and high schools every week to prepare the members of the community to face potential backlash. The organization also held the Institute on Nonviolence and Social Change on December 3 through 9, a week-long workshop that was meant to honor the first anniversary of the Montgomery bus boycott and further teach nonviolence to the community.

== Challenges ==
While the MIA achieved success with the Montgomery bus boycott, it still faced significant problems, as it almost disbanded and, subsequently, ended the boycott due to white backlash. This mostly presented itself through violence, such as threats and bombings. Though these threats did not end the MIA or the boycott, they did cause some damage by almost forcing the former's leaders, particularly King, to abdicate and even, in the case of Robert Graetz, move out of Montgomery entirely. The organization and its leaders also faced backlash legally from the white community in 1956, as, on February 21, 89 MIA leaders were indicted for allegedly going against an Alabama anti-boycott statute. However, only Dr. King was tried and, after being given the minimum penalty, had his and the other's charges dismissed. The potentially most disastrous court order against the MIA, though, was on November 5, 1956, when Montgomery filed an injunction to end the organization's car pool system. This would have caused the African American public to return to the buses since they would no longer have other means of transportation, thus effectively ending the boycott. However, the boycott was still able to be successful because, before the injunction could be officially ordered, the Supreme Court ruled that segregation on public transportation was unconstitutional in Browder v. Gayle on November 13, 1956.

The MIA also almost disbanded before the boycott's end due to inner tensions. U. J. Fields was the original recording secretary for the organization, but he was not re-elected to this office when the MIA became permanent due to the fact that, as a college student and pastor, he frequently did not attend the mass meetings. In retaliation to this decision, Fields publicly stated on June 11, 1956, that the MIA's officers were stealing the organization's funding and becoming too egotistical. These actions damaged the MIA, as they brought a negative public image onto the MIA that could have led to a loss in credibility and funds. However, King's handling and subsequent burying of Fields’ accusations only strengthened the organization, as he met with him and had him publicly recant his statements.

== After the boycott ==
Following its success in the Montgomery bus boycott, the MIA helped found the Southern Christian Leadership Conference (SCLC) in January 1957 with the Inter-Civic Council (ICC) and Alabama Christian Movement for Human Rights (ACMHR). It even left a lasting imprint on this organization, as the SCLC was created with the intention of functioning like the MIA but on a grander and more national scale. The MIA also sent five of its own officers to the SCLC, particularly by establishing Martin Luther King Jr. as its new leader.

The MIA lost some vital momentum after King moved from Montgomery to Atlanta in 1960, but the organization continued campaigns throughout the 1960s, focusing on voter registration, local school integration, and the integration of Montgomery city parks. The MIA did this by creating a ten-point plan for civic uplift entitled "Looking Forward", starting when King still led the organization, which advocated for things such as increased voter registration and improved education and health standards. Although it lost momentum, it did however improve the life of black people living in Montgomery after the boycott. The MIA has still been present in Montgomery with Johnnie Carr, as its president from 1967 until her death in 2008. The modern organization meets monthly and focuses on community service, an annual scholarship, honoring the boycott, and overseeing the creation of civil rights museums and memorials.

== Leadership committees ==
- Executive
- Finance
- Negotiating
- Program
- Strategy
- Transportation

== People ==
- Ralph Abernathy
- L. Roy Bennett
- Hugo Black
- James F. Blake
- Aurelia Browder
- Johnnie Carr
- Claudette Colvin
- Erna Dungee
- Clifford Durr
- Uriah J. Fields
- E. N. French
- Georgia Gilmore
- Robert Graetz
- Fred Gray
- Grover Hall Jr.
- T. R. M. Howard
- Debbie Jones formerly Abbie Medlock
- Martin Luther King Jr.
- Coretta Scott King
- Rufus A. Lewis
- Susie McDonald
- E.D. Nixon
- Rosa Parks
- Mother Pollard
- Jo Ann Robinson
- Bayard Rustin
- Glenn Smiley
- Mary Louise Smith
- Jefferson Underwood II

== See also ==
- Alabama Christian Movement for Human Rights
- Browder v. Gayle
- Fellowship of Reconciliation
- Inter-Civic Council
- National Association for the Advancement of Colored People
- Southern Christian Leadership Conference
- Women's Political Council
