= Charlotte L. Brown =

American educator and civil rights activist

- Born: 1839; Maryland
- Died: 1914 (aged 74–75)
- Known for: African-American civil and political rights activist

Charlotte L. Brown (1839–?) was an American educator and civil rights activist who was one of the first to legally challenge racial segregation in the United States when she filed a successful lawsuit against a streetcar company in San Francisco in the 1860s after she was forcibly removed from a segregated streetcar. Brown's legal action and the precedent it created led to additional challenges to segregation in San Francisco and within 30 years, California enacted legislation to make such segregation on streetcars illegal statewide.

== Family and early life ==
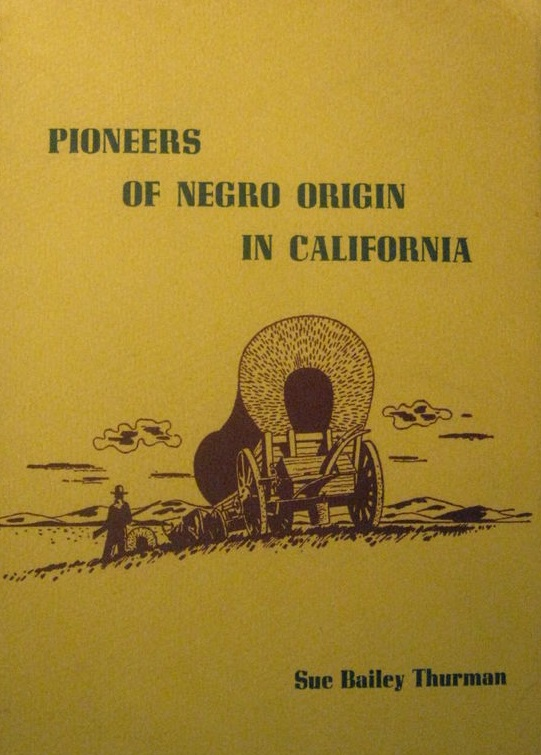
Cover of Pioneers of Negro Origin in California, by Sue Bailey Thurman

Brown was born in Maryland in 1839, the daughter of James E Brown, who was born enslaved, and Charlotte Brown, a free seamstress. The elder Charlotte Brown purchased her husband's freedom and in 1850 they were living as Free people of color in Baltimore, Maryland, with several children, including Charlotte. Some time between 1850 and 1855 they moved their family to San Francisco, which was booming as a result of the California Gold Rush, and became a part of that city's burgeoning black middle class. The black population of the city at that time was 1,176 people, or about 2 percent. In San Francisco, James E Brown ran a livery stable, was a partner in the black newspaper Mirror of the Times, an antislavery crusader, and a member of the San Francisco Literary Society, a discussion and debate group for prominent African American men. In 1855, Charlotte was the teenage bridesmaid at the San Francisco wedding of her sister Margaret, who married the wealthy Black entrepreneur George Washington Dennis.

== Streetcar incident ==
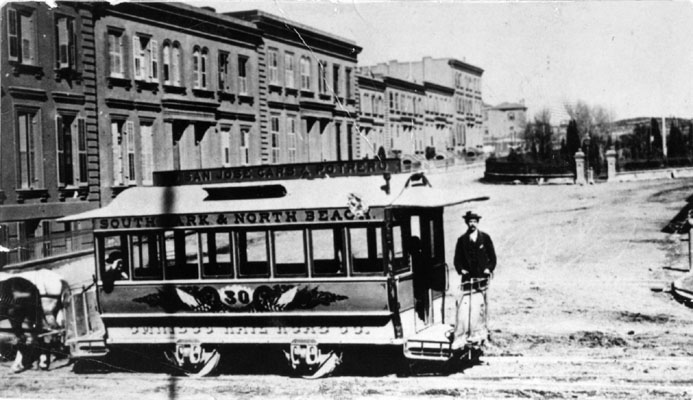
Horse-drawn streetcar, San Francisco, 1860s

At 8PM on April 17, 1863, Charlotte Brown took a seat on a horse-drawn streetcar one block from her home on Filbert Street in San Francisco. She was on her way to see her doctor. The streetcar was owned by the Omnibus Railroad Company. When the streetcar conductor approached her and asked her to leave, Brown said she "had a right to ride" and had no intention of leaving the car.

In her courtroom testimony, she stated:

"The conductor went around and collected tickets and when he came to me I handed him my ticket and he refused to take it. It was one of the Omnibus railroad tickets, one that I had purchased of them previous to that time. He replied that colored persons were not allowed to ride. I told him I had been in the habit of riding ever since the cars had been running. I answered that I had a great ways to go and I was later than I ought to be."

The conductor, Thomas Dennison, asked her several times to leave, and each time she refused. Finally, when a white woman objected to her presence, he grabbed her by the arm and escorted her off the car.

== Charlotte Brown vs. Omnibus Railroad ==
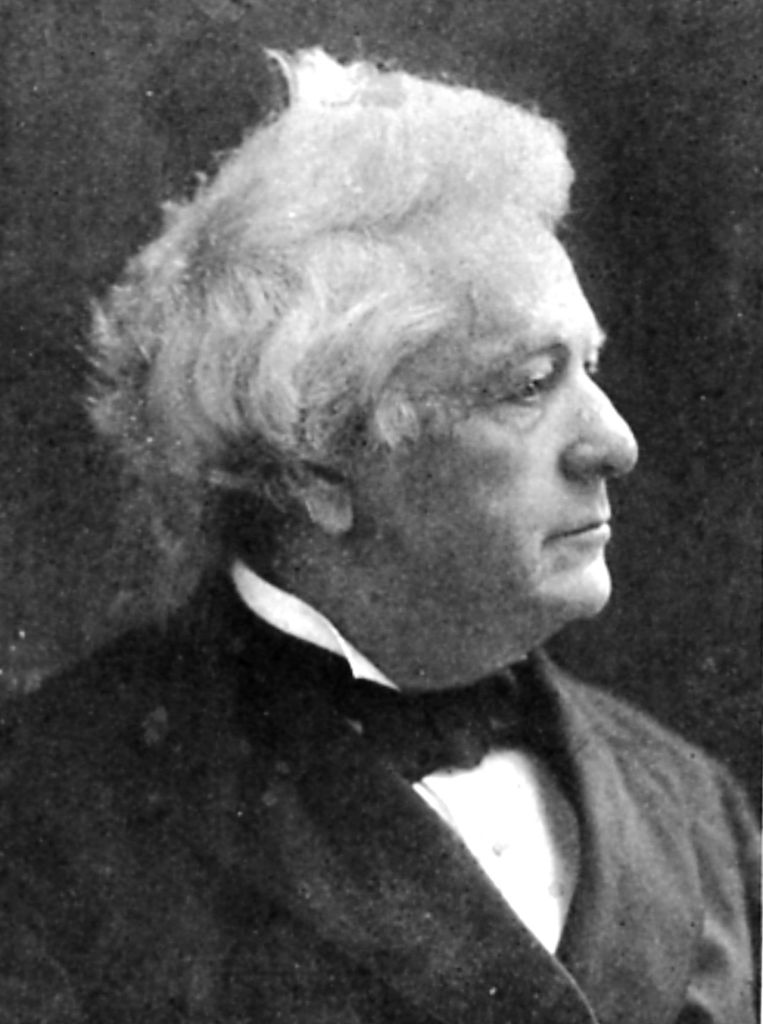
Judge Orville C. Pratt ruled in Brown's favor, calling streetcar segregation "a relic of barbarism"

Her father James E Brown hired attorney W. C. Burnett, and Charlotte Brown brought a lawsuit against the Omnibus Railroad Company for $200. African Americans had just won the right to testify against whites that same year. The Omnibus Railroad argued that its conductor's action was justified because racial segregation protected white women and children who might be fearful or 'repulsed' by riding in the same car as African Americans. Brown won her case, presided over by Judge Cowles, but the jury only awarded her twenty-five dollars. The conductor, Dennison, was convicted in a criminal court of assault and battery against Brown.

Brown's civil case was tied up in appeals for the next two years. In one retrial, the jury awarded Brown $25 and costs initially, but it was reduced to only five cents, the price of the streetcar ticket. Meanwhile, just three days after the first trial, Brown was ejected from yet another streetcar and brought a second suit against Omnibus, this time for $3,000. Finally, in October 1864, her case was tried in a higher court. In his judgment of October 5, 1864, Judge Orville C. Pratt of the 12th District Court upheld the earlier verdict in favor of Brown, ruling that excluding passengers from streetcars because of their race was illegal. He had no desire, he said in his ruling, to "perpetuate a relic of barbarism":

"It has been already quite too long tolerated by the dominant race to see with indifference the negro or mulatto treated as a brute, insulted, wronged, enslaved, made to wear a yoke, to tremble before white men, to serve him as a tool, to hold property and life at his will, to surrender to him his intellect and conscience, and to seal his lips and belie his thought through dread of the white man's power", Judge Pratt stated.

In January 1865, a jury awarded Brown $500. The Omnibus Railroad Company appealed the verdict but was refused another trial.

== Public reaction ==
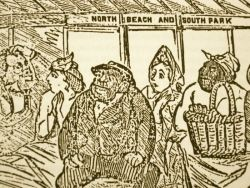
Racist editorial cartoon published in 1864 after Charlotte Brown won a lawsuit against a segregated San Francisco streetcar company

After the first trial, the black-owned newspaper the Pacific Appeal noted that the verdict in her favor "establishes the right, by law, of colored persons to ride in such conveyances".

"While the law recognizes and gives us the right to ride in such conveyances," the editorial continued, "there are a certain number of the employees of this Company, who, if a colored person attempts to cross the street while their car is passing, are seized with a sudden fit of Negrophobia, which is generally manifested by pulling their alarm bell violently, as if some danger was imminent, so afraid are they that some other of our respectable females might attempt to exercise the right that Miss Brown has just won. So long as we have law, justice and right on our side, we want no pity."

Judge Pratt's 1864 ruling was derided in an editorial cartoon by a local white-owned newspaper that showed blacks and whites riding side by side. Using a racial epithet, it accused Pratt of being partial to African Americans, and questioned whether the light-skinned Brown was really black, or just filing suit for the monetary award. A white editor of The Sacramento Daily Union, on the other hand, said of Pratt's decision, "his argument is lucid, and his decision, we believe, chimes in with the sentiment of the people".

The Charlotte Brown case paved the way for other cases brought by San Francisco African Americans like William Bowen and Mary Ellen Pleasant that challenged the "whites-only" practices of the privately owned streetcars. In 1893 streetcar segregation was officially outlawed on statewide streetcars by the California legislature.

After Charlotte Brown won her case, Senator Charles Sumner invoked the case in Congress as setting an important precedent for racial equality when he argued in favor of integrating streetcars in the nation's capital.

== Later life ==
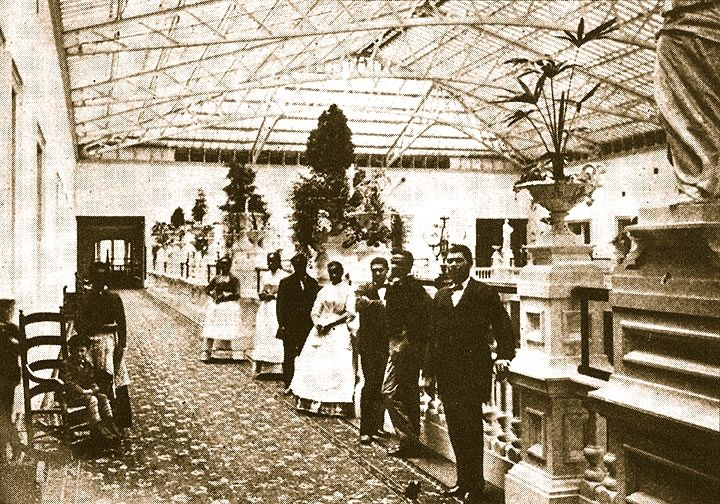
Brown's husband James Riker worked at San Francisco's Palace Hotel

In 1867, Charlotte Brown opened a school for young children at 10 Scotland Street in San Francisco, offering "all the branches of primary education" as well as music and embroidery. In 1874, she married James Henry Riker, another prominent African American activist of San Francisco, who had worked as a live-in personal servant to William Chapman Ralston and was employed as a steward at the Palace Hotel during their marriage. Riker, along with Brown's father, was one of the organizers of the 1865 California State Convention of Colored Citizens. The society pages of the black newspaper The Elevator printed an announcement in 1877 of a surprise party for a fellow steward at the Palace Hotel that was given by Charlotte and James H Riker in their residence on 1018 Powell Street in San Francisco.

After the death of her husband James in 1885 Charlotte L Riker left San Francisco and worked as a matron at University Hall at Wilberforce University in Ohio. By 1900, Mrs Riker was staying at the home of William Still in Philadelphia, where she had "a host of friends." In 1901 she assumed the matronship of the Philadelphia Home for the Aged and Infirm Colored Persons, and in 1903, as head matron of a children's school for The Woman's League of Washington DC, she was described as "a woman of culture and broad experience."

Charlotte L Brown Riker died in Norristown, Pennsylvania, on February 24, 1914.

== Historical context ==
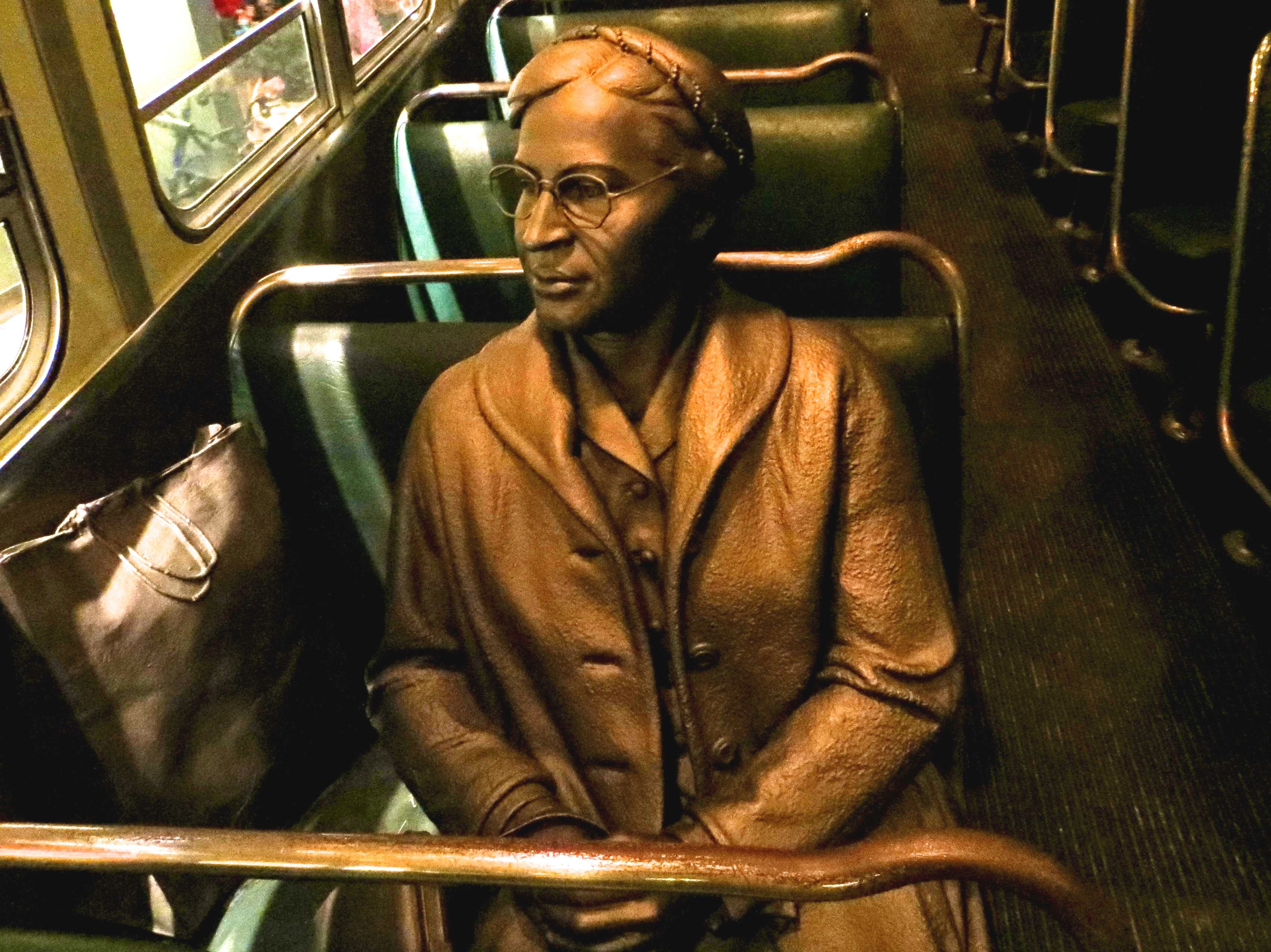
Image of Rosa Parks from Memphis Civil Rights Museum

The Charlotte Brown lawsuit was one of the first of several actions that were brought by black activists in both Southern and Northern cities throughout the United States to protest exclusion and segregation on public transportation in the 19th and 20th centuries. In 1854, Elizabeth Jennings successfully filed suit against the Third Avenue Railway Company in New York City after she had been ejected from a streetcar there because of her skin color. In Philadelphia in 1865, a "Mrs. Derry" won a civil suit and $50 in damages after a streetcar conductor threw her off the bus and kicked her when she and a group of women were returning from tending to Civil War soldiers. Sojourner Truth, Ida B. Wells, and Frances Watkins Parker also lobbied actively for streetcar integration after being refused ridership on streetcars in Washington, D.C., Memphis, and Pennsylvania.

Though streetcars in the north were largely de-segregated by the end of the 19th century, segregation on public transportation became the official policy in many cities of the South. In the 20th century, women like Irene Morgan, Claudette Colvin, and Mary Louise Smith continued to battle segregation on public transportation. In 1954, Rosa Parks challenged the practice in Montgomery, Alabama, launching a citywide bus boycott and helping to start the Civil Rights Movement of the 1950s and '60s.

In African American Women Confront the West, scholars Quintard Taylor and Shirley Ann Wilson Moore analyze the Charlotte Brown case and other 19th-century streetcar desegregation lawsuits brought by black women as they relate historically to both race and gender. They noted that it was frequently women who filed these lawsuits because of prevailing ideas of public vs. private space, and white views of black gender roles:

"Activist black men were keenly aware of the power of black women to go, where they, as men, could not," they write. "Relying on the wedge of gender, black women's lawsuits against streetcar companies ultimately assured the right to travel of blacks generally ... the declaration of law was a general one that applied not simply to Charlotte Brown or to Mary Pleasant, but to all blacks as well."

== See also ==
- List of 19th-century African-American civil rights activists
- Jim Crow laws
- African Americans in San Francisco
- Elizabeth Jennings Graham, 1854 sued and won case that led to desegregation of streetcars in New York City
- John Mitchell Jr., in 1904, he organized a black boycott of Richmond, Virginia's segregated trolley system
- Irene Morgan, in 1944, sued and won Supreme Court ruling that segregation of interstate buses was unconstitutional
- Rosa Parks, inspired boycott against segregated buses in 1950s in Montgomery, Alabama
- Aurelia Browder
- Claudette Colvin
- Susie McDonald
- Mary Louise Smith (activist)
- Viola White
