= Aurelia Browder =

African-American civil rights activist (1919–1971)

- Born: Aurelia Shines Browder; January 29, 1919; Montgomery, Alabama, U.S.
- Died: February 4, 1971 (aged 52); Montgomery, Alabama, U.S.
- Education: Alabama State University
- Occupations: Civil rights activist, seamstress, nurse midwife, teacher, businesswoman
- Organization(s): National Association for the Advancement of Colored People, Montgomery Improvement Association, Southern Christian Leadership Conference
- Known for: Plaintiff in Browder v. Gayle, case which desegregated public buses

Aurelia Shines Browder Coleman (January 29, 1919 – February 4, 1971) was an African-American civil rights activist in Montgomery, Alabama. In April 1955, almost eight months before the arrest of Rosa Parks and a month after the arrest of Claudette Colvin, she was arrested for refusing to give up her bus seat to a white rider. She was the lead plaintiff in the 1956 Browder v. Gayle federal court case.

== Biography ==
=== Early life and family ===
Aurelia Browder was born on January 29, 1919, in Montgomery, Alabama, where she resided her whole life. She was the sole economic support of her six children after she was widowed. She had several different careers throughout her life including working as a seamstress, nurse midwife and teacher. Civil rights activist Jo Ann Gibson Robinson described Browder in her memoir as "well-read, highly intelligent, fearless."

=== Education ===
Browder completed high school in her thirties and eventually earned a bachelor's degree in science from Alabama State University. She graduated with honors and was in the National Alpha Kappa Mu Honor Society there. While at Alabama State University, Browder met Jo Ann Gibson Robinson, a professor in the English Department, fellow civil rights activist, and member of the Women's Political Council. Robinson inspired Browder to tackle injustices in the transportation system, encouraging her to participate in the lawsuit proposed by the Montgomery Improvement Association (MIA).

=== Involvement in civil rights ===
Prior to her involvement in the Montgomery bus boycott, Browder was active in the voter registration campaigns of the 1950s. She spent time tutoring African Americans who wanted to take the voter registration exam, worked to eliminate poll taxes, and provided transportation to the courthouse for those who wanted to register. Aurelia Browder became associated with several civil rights groups during her time including the National Association for the Advancement of Colored People (NAACP), the Montgomery Improvement Association (MIA), and the Southern Christian Leadership Conference (SCLC).

== Browder v. Gayle ==
=== Arrest and filing of case ===
Aurelia Browder was arrested on April 19, 1955, almost eight months before the arrest of Rosa Parks and a month after the arrest of Claudette Colvin, for sitting in the white section of a public city bus in Montgomery, Alabama. She was convicted and fined for her alleged crime. On February 1, 1956, Fred Gray, the attorney for the Montgomery Improvement Association, filed a lawsuit in the U.S. District Court on behalf of five black women who had been the victims of discrimination on local buses, joined by Thurgood Marshall and Robert L. Carter of the NAACP Legal Defense Fund.

=== Plaintiffs and Defendants ===
Browder v. Gayle was filed listing five plaintiffs—Aurelia Browder, Claudette Colvin, Susie McDonald, Jeanetta Reese, and Mary Louise Smith. Browder was picked as the lead plaintiff because of her age. Two of the other plaintiffs were teenagers, and the other two were senior citizens. Browder was 37 at the time, putting her in the middle of the other plaintiffs and a good representation of all of them. Jeanetta Reese withdrew from the case soon after it was filed because of intimidation from the white community. W. A. Gayle, the Mayor of Montgomery, was the namesake defendant along with Montgomery's chief of police, Montgomery's Board of Commissioners representatives, Montgomery City Lines, Inc., two bus drivers, and Alabama Public Service Commission representatives. Fred Gray stated on many occasions that he selected Browder to be the case's lead defendant because he was convinced that she could carry this responsibility, stating things such as “I chose her because she was a matured person, and I thought she would make an excellent first witness if I needed to put someone on (the witness stand)."

=== Ruling and aftermath ===
On June 5, the judges released their decision: segregated buses violated the equal protection and due process guarantees of the Fourteenth Amendment and were therefore unconstitutional. The City of Montgomery could not enforce any law "which may require plaintiffs or any other Negroes similarly situated to submit to segregation in the use of bus transportation facilities in the City of Montgomery." Both the city and the state appealed this decision. On December 17, 1956, the Supreme Court upheld the ruling, issuing a court order to the state of Alabama to desegregate its buses. While the Montgomery bus boycott, sparked by Rosa Parks, gained lasting national attention, it was Browder's court case that resulted in segregation laws being declared unconstitutional.

== Montgomery bus boycott ==
The Montgomery Bus Boycott was not a spontaneous event; various organizations in Montgomery – including the NAACP, MIA, and Women's political council (WPC) — had been waiting for the right moment to begin protest. After several women, including the plaintiffs of Browder v. Gayle, refused to give up their seats on the bus, the spark for the boycott was ignited when Rosa Parks was arrested. The boycott, primarily led by Jo Ann Gibson Robinson, began on December 3, 1955, two days after Rosa Parks' arrest. The boycott lasted a little over a year and served as the face of the movement, gaining national attention and applying pressure on the courts to rule in favor of ending segregation. The less public side of the protest was Browder v. Gayle. The Montgomery Improvement Association filed Browder's case instead of Parks' because it would be able to skip being heard in the local courts. Rosa Parks' case would have had to go through local courts first, where the case might have stayed pending for years. By filing directly with the District Courts, they would also be able to achieve an injunction against the segregation law at the same time. The boycott ended with the Browder v. Gayle ruling, a fact often overlooked by history. While the Montgomery bus boycott gained lasting national attention, it was Browder's court case that resulted in segregation laws being declared unconstitutional.

== Later life ==
Browder continued to be an activist and involved with the NAACP, MIA and SCLC after her case was settled. She spent some time teaching veterans at the Loveless School and established her own business later in life. She died on February 4, 1971, at age 52. As of 2007, Browder's son, Butler Browder, still lived in Montgomery. He felt that his mother's legacy had been overshadowed. In a 2005 article in the Montgomery Advertiser Butler wrote, "The truth is Browder vs. Gayle changed the laws that mandated bus segregation. If it weren't for that case and continued efforts to end segregation in this country, we might still be marching."

== Commemoration ==
In 2019 a statue of Rosa Parks was unveiled in Montgomery, Alabama, and four granite markers were also unveiled near the statue on the same day to honor four plaintiffs in Browder v. Gayle, including Aurelia Browder.

== See also ==
- Browder v. Gayle
- Elizabeth Jennings Graham
- Charlotte L. Brown
- Claudette Colvin
- Susie McDonald
- Irene Morgan
- Edgar Nixon
- Mary Louise Smith (civil rights activist)
- Viola White
