= Lee v. Macon County Board of Education =

1967 civil rights case in Alabama, US

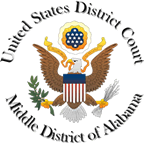
- Court: United States District Court for the Middle District of Alabama
- Full case name: Anthony T. Lee, a minor, by his father and next friend, et al. v. Macon County Board of Education, et al.
- Decided: 1967
- Citations: 231 F. Supp. 743 (M.D. Ala. 1964); 267 F. Supp. 458 (M.D. Ala. 1967)

Court membership
- Judges sitting: Frank M. Johnson, Richard Rives, Seybourn H. Lynne

Case opinions
- Mandated statewide desegregation of Alabama public schools

Keywords
- Desegregation, Civil rights movement, Education in Alabama

Lee v. Macon County Board of Education was a landmark United States civil rights case that became the legal foundation for dismantling racial segregation in public schools across Alabama. The case was filed in 1963 by attorney Fred Gray on behalf of African-American students who were denied admission to the all-white Tuskegee High School in Macon County. It culminated in a pivotal 1967 federal court ruling mandating statewide school desegregation.

== Background ==
In 1963, 14 Black students attempted to enroll at Tuskegee High School in Macon County but were refused admission on the basis of race. Represented by Fred Gray, the students and their families filed suit against the Macon County Board of Education. The case was named for plaintiff Anthony T. Lee, a minor represented by his father, and targeted racially discriminatory practices under the state's dual school system.

At the time, public education in Alabama remained effectively segregated despite the 1954 decision in Brown v. Board of Education. Although the Supreme Court had ordered desegregation "with all deliberate speed," Alabama authorities resisted integration efforts.

== Court proceedings and decisions ==
The case was heard by a three-judge panel of the United States District Court for the Middle District of Alabama, composed of Judge Frank M. Johnson, Judge Richard Rives, and Judge Seybourn Lynne. In a 1963 ruling (231 F. Supp. 743), the court ordered the immediate desegregation of the Macon County school system.

When Alabama officials, including Governor George Wallace, attempted to block enforcement of the order, the court expanded the case’s scope. In a 1967 ruling (267 F. Supp. 458), the court placed the entire Alabama public school system under federal jurisdiction for the purpose of desegregation. This action was unprecedented, effectively nationalizing desegregation oversight in a single case.

== Impact ==
The decision in Lee v. Macon established that resistance to desegregation by state officials could be overridden by federal authority. The case became a template for similar litigation across the South, and it empowered the U.S. Department of Justice and the Civil Rights Division to intervene in cases involving systemic educational discrimination.

The case also led to the creation of detailed consent decrees and compliance plans, with federal monitors enforcing integration across Alabama. It marked one of the few instances where an entire state’s educational system was brought under court-ordered desegregation.

== Legacy ==
Lee v. Macon County Board of Education remains a cornerstone in civil rights and constitutional law, particularly in education equality. Legal scholars have noted its significant expansion of federal court authority in enforcing civil rights across an entire state.

The case is still cited in contemporary litigation related to school desegregation and educational equity. The American Civil Liberties Union (ACLU) of Alabama continues to reference Lee v. Macon in its advocacy and legal strategies regarding public education.

== See also ==
- Brown v. Board of Education
- Civil Rights Act of 1964
- Green v. County School Board of New Kent County
- Desegregation busing in the United States
