= Irene Morgan =

African-American anti-segregation activist

- Born: April 9, 1917; Baltimore, Maryland, U.S.
- Died: August 10, 2007 (aged 90); Gloucester County, Virginia, U.S.
- Children: 2

Irene Amos Morgan (April 9, 1917 – August 10, 2007), later known as Irene Morgan Kirkaldy, was an African-American woman from Baltimore, Maryland, who was arrested in Middlesex County, Virginia, in 1944 under a state law imposing racial segregation in public facilities and transportation. She was traveling on an interstate bus that operated under federal law and regulations. She refused to give up her seat in what the driver said was the "white section". At the time she worked for a defense contractor on the production line for Martin B-26 Marauders.

Morgan consulted with attorneys to appeal her conviction and the NAACP Legal Defense Fund took up her case. She was represented by William H. Hastie, the former governor of the U.S. Virgin Islands and later a judge on the U.S. Court of Appeals for the Third Circuit, and Thurgood Marshall, legal counsel of the NAACP. Her case, Irene Morgan v. Commonwealth of Virginia, 328 U.S. 373 (1946), was appealed to the United States Supreme Court. In 1946 in a landmark decision, the Court ruled that the Virginia law was unconstitutional, as the Commerce clause protected interstate traffic. But neither Virginia nor other states observed the ruling and it was not enforced for decades.

== Early life, education and family ==
Irene Morgan was born in 1917 in Baltimore. She went to local schools and was raised as a Seventh-day Adventist. Morgan married Sherwood Morgan Sr., and had a son and daughter with him. He died in 1948.

During World War II, she helped the war effort by working at Glenn L. Martin, an aircraft manufacturer and defense contractor in Baltimore. She worked on the production line for the Martin B-26 Marauder.

She later married Stanley Kirkaldy and lived with him in New York City. They ran a dry-cleaning business and a child-care center near where they lived in Queens. In her 60s Kirkaldy started college studies, attending St. John's University in New York City; she received her bachelor's degree when she was 68 years old. Five years later Morgan earned a master's degree in Urban Studies from Queens College.

== Arrest, jail and conviction ==
Irene Morgan had been dealing with a recent miscarriage and was visiting her mother in Gloucester County, Virginia, to physically and mentally recover from the ordeal. Hoping to go back home so she could continue working on the production line for the B-26 Marauder, Morgan boarded a Greyhound to return to Baltimore. On July 16, 1944, Morgan boarded the Greyhound bus and had sat down next to another African-American woman who was carrying an infant. An African-American could not sit next to or across from a Caucasian passenger, but there were no designated "black" or "white" seats on the bus.

When a white couple boarded the bus at a stop in Middlesex County, Virginia, the bus driver ordered Morgan and her seatmate to surrender their seats. Her seatmate immediately retreated to the back of the bus with her infant, but Morgan refused to give up her spot. When Morgan would not move, the bus driver got off the bus to find a sheriff. The sheriff presented Morgan with an arrest warrant, but she tore up the piece of paper and threw it out of the window of the bus. When the sheriff touched her to pull her out of her seat, she kicked him in the groin. The sheriff got off the bus and a different sheriff was sent on. "He touched me, that's when I kicked him in a very bad place. He hobbled off, and another one came on. I was going to bite him, but he looked dirty, so I clawed him instead. I ripped his shirt. We were both pulling at each other. He said he would use his nightstick. I said, 'We'll whip each other'". The second sheriff got off the bus to grab the deputy.

Morgan was arrested. She had been charged with resisting arrest and violating Virginia's Jim Crow transit law. On October 18, 1944, Morgan attended her court case. She agreed to pay a $100 fine for resisting arrest but refused to plead to the segregation violation. Since Maryland did not enforce segregation for interstate travel, Virginia's Jim Crow law could possibly not apply to Morgan. Morgan's case, with the help of the NAACP, was taken to the Virginia Supreme Court. The supreme court ruled her in violation of the law. Morgan then took her case to the U.S. Supreme Court and won.

== U.S. Supreme Court case ==
Her case, Irene Morgan v. Commonwealth of Virginia, 328 U.S. 373 (1946), was argued by William H. Hastie, the former governor of the U.S. Virgin Islands and later a judge on the U.S. Court of Appeals for the Third Circuit. Thurgood Marshall of the NAACP was co-counsel; he later became the first African American to serve as a justice on the United States Supreme Court.

The U.S. Supreme Court ruled 6–1 in 1946 that Virginia's state law enforcing segregation on interstate buses was unconstitutional. Hastie and Marshall used an innovative strategy to brief and argue the case. Instead of relying upon the Equal Protection Clause of the Fourteenth Amendment, they argued successfully that segregation on interstate travel violated the Interstate Commerce Clause of the U.S. Constitution.

"If something happens to you which is wrong, the best thing to do is have it corrected in the best way you can," said Morgan. "The best thing for me to do was to go to the Supreme Court."

In 1960, in Boynton v. Virginia, the Supreme Court extended the Morgan ruling to bus terminals used in interstate bus service. African Americans continued to be ejected or arrested when they tried to integrate such facilities, as Southern states refused to obey Morgan v. Virginia. They staged numerous non-violent demonstrations using interstate buses and bus terminals, such as the Freedom Rides of 1961. White Southerners attacked the Freedom Riders, attracting renewed national media attention to the South's Jim Crow system.

== Journey of Reconciliation ==
Morgan's case inspired the 1947 Journey of Reconciliation, during which 16 activists from the Chicago-based Congress of Racial Equality rode on interstate buses through the Upper South to test the enforcement of the Supreme Court ruling. The activists divided themselves between the interstate Greyhound and Trailways bus lines. They usually placed an interracial pair in the white-area of the bus. Other activists, disguised as ordinary passengers, rode in the racial sections "reserved" for them by segregation law.

The group traveled uneventfully through Virginia, but when they reached North Carolina, they encountered arrests and violence. By the end of the Journey, the protesters had conducted over 24 "tests," and endured 12 arrests and dangerous mob violence. In a flagrant violation of the Morgan decision, North Carolina police arrested the civil rights activist Bayard Rustin. A jury convicted him and he was sentenced to 22 days on a chain gang for violating the state's segregation laws, although he had been riding on an interstate bus.

The 1947 Journey of Reconciliation, ahead of its time in the use of tactics of nonviolent direct action, inspired the highly publicized Freedom Rides of 1961, also organized by CORE.

== Death ==
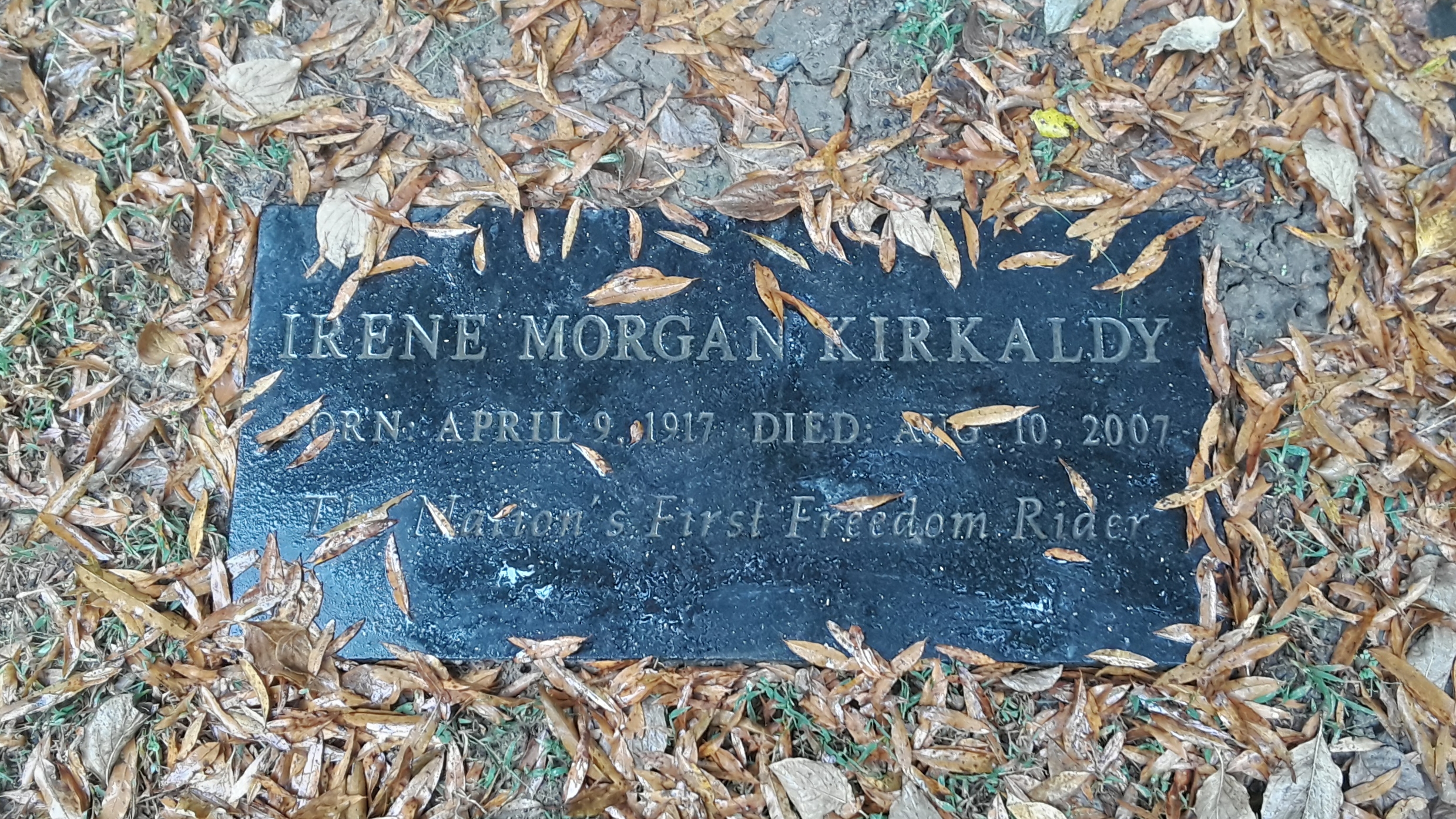
Irene Morgan Kirkaldy's grave

Irene Morgan was a lifelong member of the Seventh-day Adventist Church. She died in Gloucester, Virginia on August 10, 2007, at her daughter's home, at age 90 from complications of Alzheimer's disease. Her funeral was at Gloucester High School.

== Legacy and honors ==
- In 1995, Robin Washington produced the documentary You Don't Have to Ride Jim Crow!, aired on New Hampshire Public TV. It featured Morgan Kirkaldy and survivors of the 1947 "Journey of Reconciliation." Morgan received renewed attention for her contributions.
- In 2000 Morgan Kirkaldy was honored by Gloucester County, Virginia, during its 350th anniversary celebration.
- In 2001, President Bill Clinton awarded her the Presidential Citizens Medal.
- In 2002, PBS featured a four-part series entitled, The Rise and Fall of Jim Crow. Associated materials include an article on Morgan v. Virginia.
- In 2010, Kirkaldy was inducted into the Maryland Women's Hall of Fame.
- In 2020, Kirkaldy was included in exhibit "Voices of Resilience: The Intersection of Women on the Move" at the Springfield Museums, a Smithsonian Museum affiliate, which highlighted diverse hidden figures that changed the course of history. Kirkaldy's niece Janine Fondon curated this exhibit.

== Representation in other media ==
- Robin Washington, producer: You Don't Have to Ride Jim Crow! (1995), documentary, released on New Hampshire Public TV
- Jim Crow Stories: Richard Wormser, "'Morgan v. Virginia' (1946)", The Rise and Fall of Jim Crow, 2002, PBS

== See also ==
- Elizabeth Jennings Graham
- Charlotte L. Brown
- John Mitchell Jr.
- Montgomery bus boycott
- Claudette Colvin
- Susie McDonald
- Mary Louise Smith (activist)
- Aurelia Browder
- Rosa Parks
- Martin Luther King Jr.
