= Wendell Wilkie Gunn =

American activist and executive (born 1942)

Wendell Wilkie Gunn (born September 23, 1942) is a retired corporate executive, a former Reagan Administration official, and the first African American student to enroll and graduate from the University of North Alabama in 1965 (then Florence State College) in Florence, Alabama.

== Early life ==
Wendell Wilkie Gunn was born on Decatur Street in Tuscumbia, Alabama, on September 23, 1942. His birth was reported two days late by the midwife, a fact he only discovered when he met his future wife and discovered they shared the same birthday. One of four children, his father was a laborer at Reynolds Metal Company and an officer in the black local of the Aluminum Workers International Union. His mother was an accomplished cook and worked in various restaurants around the Shoals area. Gunn had two brothers, one of whom died by accidental drowning when he was five, and a sister. He has characterized his early life as having benefitted from “a very good support system both from my parents and my extended family and just the community … we had a good life there, a good encouraging life. In spite of the restrictions that were there … you grow up with them; you get used to them until it becomes important to you. So, it was a supportive atmosphere.”

== Educational beginnings ==
Gunn attended Trenholm High School, at that time a segregated K-12 institution in Tuscumbia. He finished high school at the private Nashville Christian Institute where he attended for three years before graduating in 1960. Gunn was not involved in civil rights activity or protests during his high school years. As President of the Student Council, he was warned by the Institute President not to participate in demonstrations that were occurring at the time for fear it would alienate the school's white benefactors Gunn recalls that “It was his warning that made me aware that maybe I should be involved in it. Now, I didn’t get involved in it until shortly after my graduation, which was in 1960. But if the call had come and said, ‘We need your help,’ I probably would have.” After high school graduation, Gunn attended Tennessee State University, a historically black university in Nashville, studying Romance languages along with math and chemistry. College was always part of the family’s plans for Gunn: “What I do remember is not ever being faced with the question of whether or not I would go to college … it was not an option not to go.”

== Enrollment at Florence State College (UNA) ==
In the summer of 1963, Gunn's summer job ended early, and partly for financial reasons and partly out of a desire to be closer to home he considered enrolling at Florence State College, a coeducational public institution a short distance across the Tennessee River from Tuscumbia in Florence, Alabama. The sight of a yearbook in the home of an African American Florence State employee prompted him to think seriously of enrolling. Gunn generally believed at the time that the court order desegregating the University of Alabama in June 1963 had resolved the integration of state colleges in Alabama. In the summer of 1963, Gunn visited campus to request an application to enroll. Several Florence State College employees in the Registrar's Office came out to ask what he wanted before disappearing, and Gunn was eventually interviewed by Dean of Students Turner Allan along with President E.B. Norton. President Norton informed Gunn that under Alabama law he could not admit him as a student, but if he sued the college in Federal Court they would be forced to admit him. Norton concluded the interview by giving Gunn a copy of the application: “He gave me the application and said, ‘Go home and talk it over with your parents.’” Gunn spoke with attorney Fred Gray, lawyer for the Montgomery Improvement Association, who filed suit in Federal Court on Gunn’s behalf, and the court ordered Gunn be admitted. Gray has described the episode as “the easiest case in my civil rights career.”

Gunn's initial unsuccessful attempt to enroll at Florence State had been reported in the local newspapers, and the family received harassing phone calls, including threats of physical violence. Undeterred, Gunn enrolled at Florence State College on September 11, 1963. After registering for classes, harassment of the family ceased: “From that day forward there were no more phone calls. Not one phone call after I enrolled.” “Looking back on it,” Gunn has said, “it makes me think there was something special about the area."

During his time at Florence State, Gunn lived at home in Tuscumbia, and during the first few days of the term he was escorted from class to class by Dean Allan. Unlike the integration of colleges and universities elsewhere in the South, his enrollment proved to be uneventful. Gunn has described the two years at Florence State as a “quiet time, really quiet time … no social life, so a lot of time to study! And so I studied!” For two years, although there was no disruption, Gunn lived on the margins of campus life: “Nobody was ever rude to me. They just walked to their classes and I walked to mine. But you know, you live in a Southern town, and in a Southern town when you see people you say ‘Hello.’... there were a few hellos. A very few hellos.”

At the end of his first year at Florence State, an incident at an awards day event signaled a shift in campus attitudes toward Gunn’s presence and marked a sharp contrast to his lack of social acceptance at the college. At the Honors Day ceremony in the spring of 1964, Gunn’s name was called in recognition of having achieved the highest grade point average in Physics. Unsure whether he should go forward and be recognized, students, faculty, and staff began to applaud, then stand, and Gunn received a standing ovation from the entire assembly as he went to the stage to be acknowledged. Gunn graduated from Florence State in 1965 with a B.A. in Chemistry and Mathematics.

== Early Corporate Career ==
After graduation from Florence State, Gunn went to work for Tennessee River Pulp and Paper Company in Counce, Tennessee. Gunn had relatives in Chicago and a desire to live in a major city where he could attend graduate school in the evenings led him to a position as a chemist working for Nalco Chemical Company in the Chicago area. While at Nalco, Gunn applied for admission to the graduate school of business at the University of Chicago. Gunn received support for his application from his former chemistry professor Joseph Thomas and President Norton: “With Dr. Norton, you didn’t even have to ask him. He’d find out where I was headed, and he would write a letter. And he used to write me a letter every time I got a promotion or something public happened to me he would write me a letter and tell me how proud he was of me. I didn’t expect that … so Florence State really became part of my support system. To the extent that if I needed support from the school, I got it.” Gunn's enrollment at Florence State permanently integrated the college, and two African American students enrolled the year after his graduation. Gunn has said that “after I had been gone awhile, I looked back and there were quite a number” of African American students at the school.

Gunn earned his M.B.A. from the University of Chicago in 1971. After completing his M.B.A. he went to work for Chase Manhattan Bank in New York, serving as Vice President of Corporate Banking from 1971- 1974, and VP for Commercial Lending from 1974 to 1979. While working at Chase Gunn also taught at Texas Southern University as an assistant professor in 1972–1973. After Chase, Gunn moved to Pepsico Inc., where he was Assistant Treasurer and Director of Investor Relations from 1979 to 1982.

== White House & Government Service ==
While giving a commencement address at the University of North Alabama in 2017, Gunn related the events that led to his going to work in the White House during the Reagan Administration. Sitting in a snow bound commuter train during the 1976 presidential campaign, he was inspired to write a letter criticizing then candidate Governor Ronald Reagan's electoral strategy with minorities. That letter brought Gunn to the attention of Jack Kemp. In 1982, although reluctant, Gunn was persuaded to join the administration during a White House visit by a personal overture from President Reagan. As a Special Assistant to the President for Policy Development, Gunn served as assistant director for Commerce and Trade within the Office of Policy Development. He also served as Executive Secretary of the Cabinet Council on Commerce and Trade. Gunn worked in the White House until 1984. Following service in the White House, Gunn worked as an economic consultant and was considered for an appointment to the Federal Reserve Board in 1985.

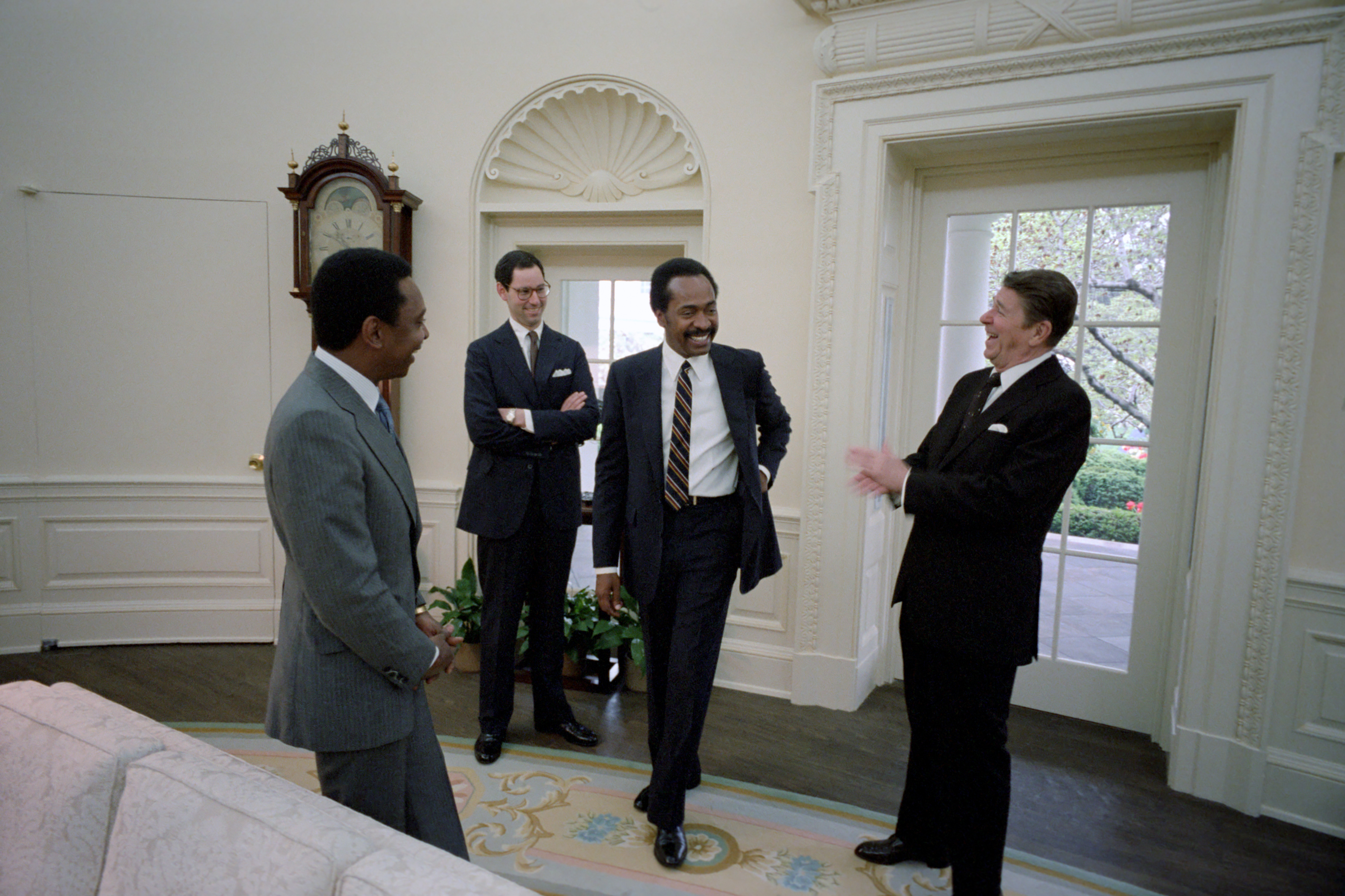
Wendell W. Gunn in White House with President Reagan

After the election of George H.W. Bush in 1988 and Jack Kemp's appointment as Secretary of Housing and Urban Development, Gunn was chosen as Kemp's Chief of Staff, a role he held until 1990. Subsequently, Gunn was a vice president at MetLife Pension & Investments until 1996. After leaving MetLife, Gunn founded and served as managing director of Gunn Solutions of Stamford, CT, an Information technology consulting company to institutional investment managers.

== Awards, Distinction, & Legacy ==
Gunn served as a member of the GOP Economic Advisory Council from 1976 to 1980 and on the Republican National Committee's Advisory Council on Economic Affairs and Subcommittee on Tax Policy and Monetary Affairs. Gunn was as a member of the Board of Directors of the New Coalition for Economic and Social Change and a member of the advisory board of the Lincoln Institute for Research and Education. In 2013, Gunn was chosen as the Convocation Speaker at his alma mater, the University of North Alabama and participated in special events commemorating the integration of the institution fifty years earlier. In 2017, Gunn was chosen to make the Commencement address at the spring graduation ceremonies at UNA and received an Honorary Doctorate of Humane Letters in recognition of his extraordinary lifetime achievements. The UNA Board of Trustees resolution awarding the Honorary Doctorate reads in part that “Gunn epitomizes the traits of perseverance and integrity that cross social, racial, and cultural backgrounds that the University desires for all students as a means to academic and future success.” At a ceremony on March 14, 2018, the University of North Alabama renamed the prominently located Student Commons Building the Wendell W. Gunn University Commons Building. Gunn is currently researching the context and historical background that led to the integration of Florence State College.

== Personal ==
Gunn is married with two sons and a daughter and resides in Stamford, Connecticut.
