= Elizabeth Jennings Graham =

African-American activist (1827–1901)

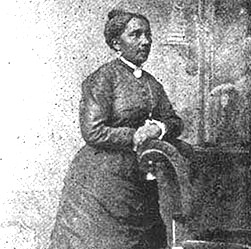
- Graham c. 1895
- Born: March 1827
- Died: June 5, 1901 (aged 74)
- Known for: African-American civil rights figure
- Spouse: Charles Graham (m. 1860–1867)
- Father: Thomas L. Jennings

Elizabeth Jennings Graham (March 1827 – June 5, 1901) was an African-American teacher and civil rights figure.

In 1854, Graham insisted on her right to ride on an available New York City streetcar at a time when all such companies were private and most operated segregated cars. Her case was decided in her favor in 1855, and it led to the eventual desegregation of all New York City transit systems by 1865.

Graham later started the city's first kindergarten for African-American children, operating it from her home on 247 West 41st Street until her death in 1901.

== Early life ==
Jennings was born free in March 1827 (the exact date is unknown). Her parents, Thomas L. Jennings (1791–1856) and his wife, born Elizabeth Cartwright (1798–1873), had three children: Matilda Jennings Thompson (1824–1886), Elizabeth, and James E. Jennings (1832 – May 5, 1860). Her father was a Freeman and her mother was born enslaved. He became a successful tailor and an influential member of New York's black community. He has been identified as the earliest known example of a Black person to hold a patent in the United States in their own name; in 1821, he was awarded a patent from the U.S. government for developing dry scouring, a new method to dry clean clothing. With the proceeds he received from his patented dry-cleaning process, Thomas Jennings bought his family's freedom. His wife would have otherwise been the legal property of her owner until 1827, under New York state's gradual abolition law of 1799.

Jennings Graham's mother, Elizabeth Cartwright Jennings, was a prominent woman in her local community. She is known for penning the speech 10-year-old Elizabeth Jennings delivered, "On the Improvement of the Mind," at a meeting of the Ladies Literary Society of New York (founded 1834). The literary society was founded by New York's elite black women to promote self-improvement through community activities, reading, and discussion. Produced and given in 1837, the speech discusses how the neglect of cultivating the mind would keep blacks inferior to whites and would have whites and enemies believe that blacks do not have any minds at all. Jennings believed the mind was very powerful and its improvement could help with the abolition of slavery and discrimination. Therefore, she called upon black women to develop their minds and take action. The importance of improving the mind was a consistent theme that developed in members of New York's Black Elite in the post-Revolutionary period.

By 1854, Jennings had become a schoolteacher and church organist. She taught at the city's private African Free School, which had several locations by this time, and later in the public schools including Colored School No. 5 at 19 Thomas Street.

== Jennings v. Third Ave. Railroad ==
By the 1850s, the horse-drawn streetcar on rails became a more common mode of transportation, competing with the horse-drawn omnibus in the city. (Elevated heavy rail transportation did not go into service in New York City until 1869.) Like the nearly obsolete omnibus lines, the streetcars were owned by private companies, which regularly barred access to their service on the basis of race. The owners and drivers could easily refuse service to passengers of African descent or demand racially segregated seating.

On Sunday, July 16, 1854, Jennings went to the First Colored Congregational Church, where she was an organist. As she was running late, she boarded a streetcar of the Third Avenue Railroad Company at the corner of Pearl Street and Chatham Street. The conductor ordered her to get off. When she refused, the conductor tried to remove her by force. Eventually, with the aid of a police officer, Jennings was ejected from the streetcar.

Horace Greeley's New York Tribune commented on the incident in February 1855:

She got upon one of the company's cars last summer, on the Sabbath, to ride to church. The conductor undertook to get her off, first alleging the car was full; when that was shown to be false, he pretended the other passengers were displeased at her presence; but (when) she insisted on her rights, he took hold of her by force to expel her. She resisted. The conductor got her down on the platform, jammed her bonnet, soiled her dress and injured her person. Quite a crowd gathered, but she effectually resisted. Finally, after the car had gone on further, with the aid of a policeman they succeeded in removing her.

The incident sparked an organized movement among black New Yorkers to end racial discrimination on streetcars, led by notables such as Jennings's father, Rev. James W. C. Pennington, and Rev. Henry Highland Garnet. Her story was publicized by Frederick Douglass in his newspaper, and it received national attention. Jennings's father filed a lawsuit on behalf of his daughter against the driver, the conductor, and the Third Avenue Railroad Company in Brooklyn, where the Third Avenue company was headquartered. This was one of four streetcar companies franchised in the city and had been in operation for about one year. She was represented by the law firm of Culver, Parker, and Arthur. Her case was handled by the firm's 24-year-old junior partner Chester A. Arthur, future president of the United States.

In 1855, the court ruled in her favor. In his charge to the jury, Brooklyn Circuit Court Judge William Rockwell declared: "Colored persons if sober, well-behaved and free from disease, had the same rights as others and could neither be excluded by any rules of the company, nor by force or violence."

The jury awarded Jennings damages in the amount of $250 (equivalent to $8,600 in 2025) as well as $22.50 in costs. The next day, the Third Avenue Railroad Company ordered its cars desegregated.

As important as the Jennings case was, it did not mean that all streetcar lines would desegregate. Leading African-American activists formed the New York Legal Rights Association to continue the fight. In May 1855, James W. C. Pennington brought suit after being forcefully removed from a car of the Eighth Avenue Railroad, another of the first four companies. After steps forward and back, a decade later in 1865, New York's public transit services were fully desegregated. The last case was a challenge by a black woman named Ellen Anderson, a widow of a fallen United States Colored Troops soldier, a fact that won public support for her.

== Later life ==
Elizabeth Jennings married Charles Graham (1830–1867) of Long Branch, New Jersey, on June 18, 1860, in Manhattan. They had a son, Thomas J. Graham. He was a sickly child who died of convulsions at the age of one during the New York Draft Riots of July 16, 1863. With the assistance of a white undertaker, the Grahams slipped through mob-filled streets and buried their child in Cypress Hills Cemetery in Brooklyn. The funeral service was read by Reverend Morgan Dix of the Trinity Church on Wall Street.

After the New York Draft Riots, there were numerous attacks against the African-American community. The Grahams left Manhattan with her mother to live with her sister Matilda in Monmouth County, New Jersey, in or near the town of Eaton. Charles died in 1867 while they were living in New Jersey. Elizabeth, along with her mother and sister, moved back to New York City in the late 1860s or 1870.

Graham lived her later years at 247 West 41st Street. She founded and operated the city's first kindergarten for black children in her home. She died on June 5, 1901, at the age of 74, according to her tombstone, and was buried in Cypress Hills Cemetery along with her son and her husband.

== Legacy ==
In 2007, New York City co-named a block of Park Row "Elizabeth Jennings Place" after a campaign by children from P. S. 361.

On January 2, 2018, Jennings's first biography was published, written by Amy Hill Hearth. Entitled Streetcar to Justice: How Elizabeth Jennings Won the Right to Ride in New York and intended for middle-grade to adult readers, the book was published by HarperCollins/Greenwillow Books in New York. Jerry Mikorenda authored America's First Freedom Rider: Elizabeth Jennings, Chester A. Arthur, and the Early Fight for Civil Rights, about the legal fight which arose from her forcible removal out of the streetcar, published in December 2019 by Rowman & Littlefield, Lanham, MD.

In 2019, New York City First Lady Chirlane McCray announced that the city would build a statue honoring Graham near Grand Central Terminal.

In September 2024, the Elizabeth Jennings’ School for Bold Explorers, a progressive public elementary school, opened its doors in Brooklyn, NY. Elizabeth Jennings’ resilience, commitment to justice, and dedication to equality and education guide the school’s mission.

== See also ==
- Charlotte L. Brown, desegregated streetcars in San Francisco in the 1860s
- John Mitchell Jr., in 1904, he organized a black boycott of Richmond, Virginia's segregated trolley system
- Irene Morgan, in 1944, sued and won Supreme Court ruling that segregation of interstate buses was unconstitutional
- Rosa Parks, inspired boycott against segregated buses in 1950s in Montgomery, Alabama
- Aurelia Browder
- Claudette Colvin
- Susie McDonald
- Mary Louise Smith (activist)
- Viola White
