= LAMP High School =

Location
- 3440 McGehee Rd; Montgomery, Alabama 36111; United States; 32°19′57″N 86°14′48″W

Information
- Other name: LAMP
- Type: Public
- Motto: Be better than yesterday
- Established: 1984 (42 years ago)
- CEEB code: 011896
- Principal: Aurelio Harrison
- Teaching staff: 28.00 (on an FTE basis)
- Grades: High school (9-12)
- Enrollment: 433 (2023-24)
- Student to teacher ratio: 15.46
- Colors: Maroon and gold
- Mascot: Golden Tiger
- Nickname: LAMPers
- Rival: Montgomery Catholic Preparatory School, BTW Magnet High School, Saint James School
- Newspaper: Lamp Post News
- Yearbook: The Torch
- Website: www.mps.k12.al.us/o/loveless

Loveless Academic Magnet Program High school, known as LAMP High School, is a magnet high school in Montgomery, Alabama. It was housed in the former Loveless School. It has a student body of around 500 students. LAMP was originally part of Sidney Lanier High School, became a separate school and moved further into West Montgomery in the 2000s, and then temporarily resided in the old Houston Hill Middle School near downtown Montgomery before moving to the old Montgomery Mall off of South Boulevard in 2017.

== History ==
Loveless School was established in 1923 and named for Henry Allen Loveless. It became a junior high school. Prominent alumni include civil rights lawyer Fred Gray. Aurelia Browder taught veterans at the school. It closed in 1999 and became home to LAMP High School.

== Rankings ==
In 2008, LAMP was named #18 on U.S. News & World Report's Gold Medal List and #56 in Newsweek's list of the top 1000 high schools in the United States. In 2011, Newsweek ranked LAMP as the 13th best high school in the United States. In 2013, LAMP was named the #1 high magnet high school in the nation, #1 in the state, and #7 overall by U.S. News & World Report.

== Admission ==
Acceptance into LAMP is based on academic records indicating demonstrated ability to complete higher-level academic courses and maintain disciplined study and work habits. However, due to Federal mandates, LAMP has changed its acceptance requirements into a lottery-based system.

== IB program ==
In 2014, LAMP was recognized as an International Baccalaureate World School and began its IB program in the fall of that year. May 2016 saw the first IB class graduate. However, the decision was made at the end of July 2017 to not renew the IB program; therefore, the last IB class graduated in May 2018.

== New building ==
LAMP was originally a part of Sidney Lanier, but as the program grew, it soon moved to a vacated elementary school building, Loveless Elementary. On September 17, 2014, Montgomery Public Schools announced that LAMP would receive a new school site due to structural problems with the Loveless building that officials deemed highly unsafe. MPS stated that until 2016, the students would temporarily be moved into a previously closed school known as Houston Hill Middle School, a move that took place during the school year in November 2014. LAMP's site at Houston Hill boasted a custom classroom trailer park, lush recreational field, a variety of free-range domestic fowl, and a two-level parking deck. Due to the inevitable delays in construction the date for the school to move was postponed, but the new site of the school is at the Montgomery Mall's old site, in the space formerly occupied by a Parisian department store, alongside Montgomery's Technology school. The area has been reconstructed as OneCenter. The new school site opened in 2017.

== Athletics ==
LAMP currently fields 17 competitive athletic teams in 4A competition.

== Notable people ==
- Saladin K. Patterson, television writer and producer
