= Mary Louise Smith (activist) =

American civil rights activist (born 1937)

Mary Louise Ware (née Smith; born 1937) is an African-American civil rights activist. She was arrested in October 1955 at the age of 18 in Montgomery, Alabama for refusing to give up her seat on the segregated bus system. She is one of several women who were arrested for this offense prior to Rosa Parks that year. Parks was the figure around whom the Montgomery bus boycott was organized, starting December 5, 1955.

On February 1, 1956, Smith was one of five women named as plaintiffs in the federal civil suit, Browder v. Gayle, challenging the constitutionality of the state and local bus segregation laws. On June 13, 1956, a three-judge panel of the United States District Court ruled that the laws were unconstitutional. The ruling was upheld by the United States Supreme Court on November 13 in a landmark decision, and in December it declined to reconsider. On December 20, 1956, the Supreme Court ordered Alabama to desegregate its buses and the Montgomery bus boycott ended.

== Early life and education ==
Mary Louise Smith was born in Montgomery, Alabama, into a Catholic family. She and all her siblings attended and graduated from St. Jude Educational Institute. She was baptized at St. Jude's Church, where she was a parishioner.

At the age of 18, on October 21, 1955, Smith was returning home on the Montgomery city bus, and was ordered to relinquish her seat to a white passenger who had boarded later. She refused to do so and was arrested. She was charged with failure to obey segregation orders, some 40 days before the arrest of Rosa Parks on similar charges. She was arrested and fined $12.

Activist E. D. Nixon, leading some of the bus boycott movement, shared information that Smith's father was an alcoholic, and she was not the right symbol to withstand the publicity. The family and neighbors dispute this characterization. Additionally, she was considered not the "right class" to be the rallying point for the movement. Smith's father represented her in court, without aid from outside political organizations.

Attorney Fred Gray recruited Smith and her father to become plaintiffs in a federal civil rights class-action lawsuit to end segregated seating on city buses.

== Browder v. Gayle ==
On February 1, 1956, Gray and other attorneys filed a civil suit, Browder v. Gayle in the United States District Court, challenging state and local laws on bus segregation. Smith was one of five plaintiffs, including Aurelia Browder, Claudette Colvin, Susie McDonald, and Jeanetta Reese. (Reese left the case that month because of intimidation.) The women, other than Reese, testified before a three-judge panel, and on June 13, 1956, the court ruled that the laws were unconstitutional, based on equal protection under the Fourteenth Amendment.

Appealed by the city and state, the case made its way to the United States Supreme Court. On November 13, 1956, it affirmed the lower court's ruling. On December 17, it declined an appeal by the city and state to reconsider, and on December 20 ordered the state to desegregate its buses. This ended the Montgomery bus boycott with success.

== Later years ==
Little information is available about her personal life. She married Mr. Ware and they had children together.

Smith followed the civil rights movement, but was not actively part of the political organization. She did attend the 1963 March on Washington.

In 1969, Smith and her sister allowed their sons to become plaintiffs in a racial discrimination lawsuit against the Montgomery YMCA. Lawyer Morris Dees represented their suit, which called out the YMCA for not allowing her and her sister's children into their summer camp program. In 1972, the U.S. District court ruled in their favor and ended segregation at the YMCA as well as voided remaining segregation ordinances in the city.

Smith is active with her 12 grandchildren and 3 great-grandchildren. She still lives in Montgomery, Alabama, and her older sister lives across the street.

When Rosa Parks died in October 2005, Smith Ware, then 68, attended the memorial service in Montgomery. "I had to pay my tribute to her, [s]he was our role model."

== Tributes ==
- Rita Dove, a United States poet laureate, mentions Mary Louise Smith in her poem "The Enactment", in her collection, On the Bus with Rosa Parks (1999). She also referred to the then-young activist in her magazine article "The Torchbearer Rosa Parks".
- In 2019 a statue of Rosa Parks was unveiled in Montgomery, Alabama, and four granite markers were also unveiled near the statue on the same day to honor four plaintiffs in Browder v. Gayle, including Mary Louise Smith. Smith also took part in the unveiling ceremony.
- In 2023, Smith received a historical marker in Montgomery for her own actions.

== See also ==
- Elizabeth Jennings Graham
- Charlotte L. Brown
- Aurelia Browder
- Claudette Colvin
- Susie McDonald
- Irene Morgan
- Rosa Parks
- Viola White
