= Browder v. Gayle =

1956 United States Supreme Court case

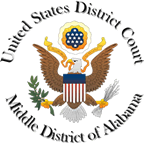
- Court: United States District Court for the Middle District of Alabama
- Decided: June 5, 1956
- Citation: 142 F. Supp. 707 (1956)

Court membership
- Judges sitting: Richard Rives, Seybourn Harris Lynne, Frank Minis Johnson

Case opinions
- Decision by: Rives
- Concurrence: Johnson
- Dissent: Lynne

Browder v. Gayle
- Supreme Court of the United States

Decided November 13, 1956
- Full case name: Browder v. Gayle
- Citations: 352 U.S. 903 (more)

Case history
- Subsequent: Petition for rehearing denied.

Holding
- Judgement affirmed.

Court membership
- Chief Justice Earl Warren Associate Justices Hugo Black · Stanley F. Reed; Felix Frankfurter · William O. Douglas; Harold H. Burton · Tom C. Clark; John M. Harlan II

Case opinion
- Per curiam
- This case overturned a previous ruling or rulings
- Plessy v. Ferguson

Browder v. Gayle, 142 F. Supp. 707 (1956), is a landmark federal court case that ruled that segregation on public transportation is unconstitutional. The case was heard before a three-judge panel of the United States District Court for the Middle District of Alabama on the segregation of Montgomery and Alabama state buses. The panel consisted of Middle District of Alabama Judge Frank Minis Johnson, Northern District of Alabama Judge Seybourn Harris Lynne, and Fifth Circuit Court of Appeals Judge Richard Rives. The main plaintiffs in the case were Aurelia Browder, Claudette Colvin, Susie McDonald, and Mary Louise Smith. Their attorney, Fred Gray, also approached Jeanetta Reese to join the suit, but intimidation by segregationists (including threatening phone calls and pressure from a senior police officer for whom she worked) caused her to withdraw.

On June 5, 1956, the District Court ruled 2–1, with Lynne dissenting, that bus segregation is unconstitutional under the Equal Protection Clause of the 14th Amendment to the U.S. Constitution.

The state and city appealed, and the decision was summarily affirmed by the United States Supreme Court on November 13, 1956, effectively banning segregation on public transportation federally.

== Background ==
=== The women behind the case ===
On March 2, 1955, in Montgomery, Alabama, 15-year-old Claudette Colvin became the first person to be arrested for her refusal to give up her seat to white patrons boarding the bus. She was arrested on multiple charges as a result of her refusal before she was able to present her case before the U.S. District Court. The following month, Aurelia Browder became the second person to be arrested for refusing to give up her seat to a white patron on April 19, 1955 (note that some online sources, likely incorrectly, give this date as April 29). Six months later, in October 1955, Mary Louise Smith and Susie McDonald were arrested for the same offense. Smith was arrested on October 21 and held in jail for two hours before being released and fined. There are conflicting accounts regarding the exact date of McDonald's October arrest.

=== The Montgomery Bus Boycott ===
Rosa Parks was arrested for refusing to give up her seat on a public bus on December 1, 1955. After calling her mother from jail, her mom contacted E.D. Nixon, president of the NAACP and secretary of the new Montgomery Improvement Association, who was able to have Clifford Durr (a white lawyer who, with his wife, Virginia Durr, was an activist in the Civil Rights Movement) pay the fine to bring her home. Beginning the following week, the NAACP had volunteers handing out pamphlets to promote a day long bus protest in response to the arrest of Rosa Parks.

Shortly after beginning the Montgomery bus boycott in December 1955, black community leaders began to discuss filing a federal lawsuit to challenge the City of Montgomery and Alabama bus segregation laws. They sought a declaratory judgment that Alabama state statutes and ordinances of the city of Montgomery providing for and enforcing racial segregation on "privately"-operated buses were in violation of Fourteenth Amendment protections for equal treatment.

=== Building the case ===
The cause of action was brought under Reconstruction-era civil rights legislation, specifically 42 U.S.C. sections 1981, 1983. The United States District Court had original jurisdiction to hear the case because it was a federal question (section 1331) and because it concerned civil rights (section 1343). A three-judge district court panel was required under 28 U.S.C. § 2281 for the granting of an interlocutory or the permanent injunction restraining the enforcement of a state statute by restraining the action of a state officer, such as an official of the Alabama Public Service Commission. The court held that since officials admitted that they were enforcing state statutes, a three-judge court had jurisdiction over the case.

About two months after the bus boycott began, civil rights activists reconsidered the case of Claudette Colvin. Fred Gray, E.D. Nixon, and Clifford Durr searched for the ideal case law to challenge the constitutional legitimacy of Montgomery and Alabama bus segregation laws.

Durr was concerned that an appeal of Parks's case would get tied up in the Alabama state courts and thought that they needed a way to get directly to federal courts. Gray did research for the lawsuit and consulted with NAACP Legal Defense Fund attorneys Robert L. Carter and Thurgood Marshall who ultimately helped them decide to approach Claudette Colvin, Aurelia Browder, Susie McDonald, Mary Louise Smith, and Jeanetta Reese, all women who had been discriminated against by drivers enforcing segregation policy in the Montgomery bus system. They agreed to become plaintiffs in a federal civil action lawsuit, thus bypassing the Alabama court system. Reese dropped out of the case in February 1956 because of intimidation by members of the white community. She falsely claimed she had not agreed to the lawsuit, which led to an unsuccessful attempt to disbar Gray for supposedly improperly representing her. Furthermore, Fred Gray also attempted to interview men to join the case, however they were too fearful to spearhead the fight. Convinced that she could carry the responsibility, Gray selected Aurelia Browder to be the case's lead plaintiff.

== Decision ==
On February 1, 1956, Gray filed the case Browder v. Gayle in U.S. District Court which would charge the defendants W. A. Gayle (mayor of Montgomery), city commissioners Clyde Sellers and Frank Parks, Goodwyn Ruppenthal (the Chief of police), The Montgomery City Lines, Inc., and members of the Alabama Public Service Commission.

On June 5, 1956, the District Court ruled that "the enforced segregation of black and white passengers on motor buses operating in the City of Montgomery violates the Constitution and laws of the United States" because the conditions deprived people of equal protection under the Fourteenth Amendment. The court further discouraged Alabama and Montgomery from continuing to operate segregated buses.

The state and city appealed the district court's decision to the U.S. Supreme Court. On November 13, 1956, the Supreme Court summarily affirmed the District Court's ruling and ordered Alabama and Montgomery to desegregate its buses. One month later, on December 17, the Supreme Court denied the state's petition for rehearing, and on December 20, the ruling was implemented after Gayle was handed official written notice by federal marshals.

== Commemoration ==
In 2019 a statue of Rosa Parks was unveiled in Montgomery, Alabama, and four granite markers were also unveiled near the statue on the same day to honor four plaintiffs in Browder v. Gayle - Aurelia Browder, Susie McDonald, Claudette Colvin, and Mary Louise Smith. One of those plaintiffs, Mary Louise Smith, took part in the unveiling ceremony.

== See also ==
- Rosa Parks
- Aurelia Browder
- Claudette Colvin
- Susie McDonald
- Mary Louise Smith
- Thurgood Marshall
- Plessy v. Ferguson (1896), case upholding "separate but equal" accommodations
- Brown v. Board of Education (1954), declared segregated schools were inherently unequal.
- Bolling v. Sharpe (1954), found segregated schools in the District of Columbia were unconstitutional
- Keys v. Carolina Coach Co. (1955), overturned Plessy v. Ferguson in transportation
