= Claudette Colvin =

African-American civil rights activist (1939–2026)

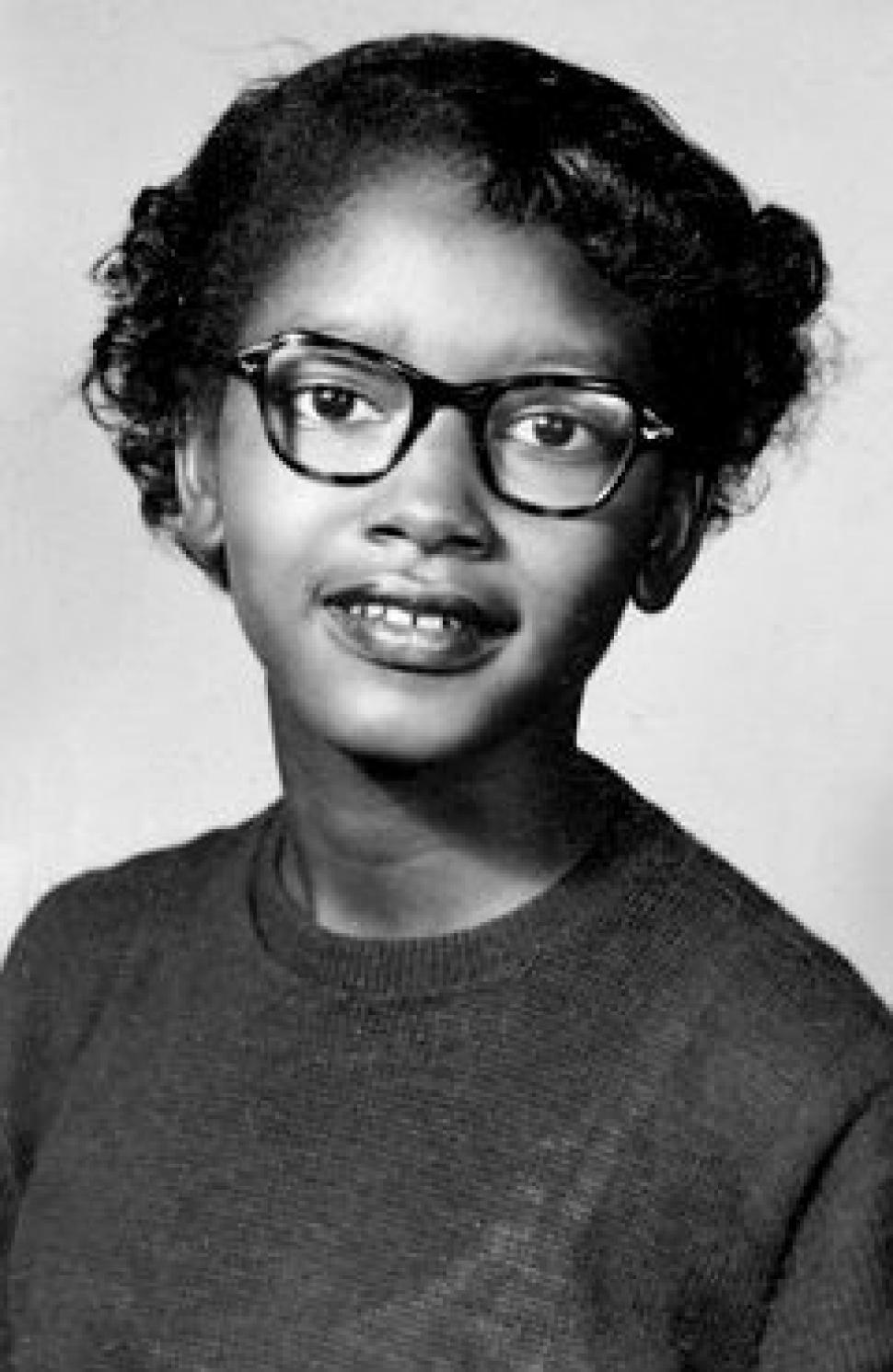
- Colvin in 1952, aged 13
- Born: Claudette Austin; September 5, 1939; Montgomery, Alabama, U.S.
- Died: January 13, 2026 (aged 86); Texas, U.S.
- Burial place: Zion Memorial Gardens, Birmingham, Alabama
- Occupations: Civil rights activist, nurse aide
- Years active: 1969–2004 (as nurse aide)
- Era: Civil rights movement (1954–1968)
- Known for: Arrest at the age of 15 in Montgomery, Alabama for refusing to give up her seat to a white woman on a segregated bus, nine months before the similar Rosa Parks incident
- Children: 2

Claudette Colvin (née Austin; September 5, 1939 – January 13, 2026) was an American pioneer of the 1950s civil rights movement and nurse aide. On March 2, 1955, she was arrested at the age of 15 in Montgomery, Alabama, for refusing to give up her seat to a white woman on a crowded, segregated bus. It occurred nine months before the similar, more widely known incident in which Rosa Parks, secretary of the local chapter of the National Association for the Advancement of Colored People (NAACP), helped spark the 1955 Montgomery bus boycott.

Colvin was one of four plaintiffs in the first federal court case filed by civil rights attorney Fred Gray on February 1, 1956, as Browder v. Gayle, to challenge bus segregation in the city. In a United States district court, Colvin testified before the three-judge panel that heard the case. On June 13, 1956, the judges determined that the state and local laws requiring bus segregation in Alabama were unconstitutional. The case went to the United States Supreme Court on appeal by the state, which upheld the district court's ruling on November 13, 1956. One month later, the Supreme Court affirmed the order to Montgomery and the state of Alabama to end bus segregation. The Montgomery bus boycott was then called off after a few months. The court subsequently declared all segregation on public transportation unconstitutional.

For many years, Montgomery's black leaders did not publicize Colvin's pioneering effort. She said, "Young people think Rosa Parks just sat down on a bus and ended segregation, but that wasn't the case at all." Colvin's case was dropped by civil rights campaigners because she was unmarried and pregnant during the proceedings. It is now widely accepted that she was not accredited by civil rights campaigners due to her circumstances. Rosa Parks said, "If the white press got ahold of that information, they would have [had] a field day. They'd call her a bad girl, and her case wouldn't have a chance."

In 2021, the record of Colvin's arrest and adjudication of delinquency was expunged by the district court in the county where the charges against her had been brought more than 66 years earlier.

== Early life ==
Claudette Colvin was born Claudette Austin in Birmingham, Alabama, on September 5, 1939, to Mary Jane Gadson and C. P. Austin. When Austin abandoned the family, Gadson was unable to financially support her children. Colvin and her younger sister, Delphine, were taken in by their great aunt and uncle, Mary Anne and Q. P. Colvin, whose daughter, Velma, had already moved out. Colvin and her sister referred to the Colvins as their parents and took their last name.

When they took Claudette in, the Colvins lived in Pine Level, a small country town in Montgomery County, the same town where Rosa Parks grew up. When Colvin was eight years old, the Colvins moved to King Hill, a poor black neighborhood in Montgomery where she spent the rest of her childhood.

Two days before Colvin's 13th birthday, Delphine died of polio. Not long after, in September 1952, Colvin started attending Booker T. Washington High School. Despite being a good student, Colvin had difficulty connecting with her peers in school due to grief. She was a member of the NAACP Youth Council, where she formed a close relationship with her mentor, Rosa Parks.

== Bus incident ==
In 1955, Colvin was a student at the segregated Booker T. Washington High School in Montgomery. Because her family did not own a car, she relied on the city bus system, which was predominantly ridden by African Americans who were required to follow segregated seating policies. Colvin was a member of the NAACP Youth Council and had been learning in school about African American history, including the Jim Crow laws. "I wasn't afraid. I was a teenager!"

On March 2, 1955, Colvin boarded a Highland Gardens bus after school and sat near an emergency exit in a middle row. According to Montgomery's ordinance, African American passengers were required to get up from their seats if the white section became full, and to stand in the aisle if there were no free seats in the back. When a white woman was left standing, bus driver, Robert W. Cleere commanded Colvin and three other black women in her row to move to the back. The others complied, but Colvin remained seated as another African American woman, Ruth Hamilton, who was pregnant, got on the bus and sat beside her.

The driver looked at the two women in his mirror and told them get up. Ruth Hamilton "said she was not going to get up and that she had paid her fare and that she didn't feel like standing," recalls Colvin. "I told him I was not going to get up either. So he said, 'If you are not going to get up, I will get a policeman.'" The police arrived and convinced a black man sitting behind the two women to move to make room for Mrs. Hamilton to move back, but Colvin still refused to move. She was then forcibly removed and arrested by two policemen, Thomas J. Ward and Paul Headley, who dragged her backwards off the bus as one officer kicked her, and placed her in handcuffs.

This event took place nine months before the NAACP secretary Rosa Parks was arrested for the same offense. Colvin later said: "My mother told me to be quiet about what I did. She told me: 'Let Rosa be the one. White people aren't going to bother Rosa[,] her skin is lighter than yours and they like her.'" Colvin did not receive the same attention as Parks for a number of reasons: she did not have "good hair", she was not fair-skinned, she was a teenager, and she was pregnant. The leaders in the Civil Rights Movement tried to keep up appearances and make the "most appealing" protesters the most seen.

=== Further context and recollections ===
Colvin's moment of activism was not solitary or random. In high school, she had high ambitions of political activity. She dreamed of becoming the President of the United States. Her political inclination was fueled in part by an incident with her schoolmate, Jeremiah Reeves. His case was the first time that she had witnessed the work of the NAACP. Reeves was sentenced to death and executed for raping a white woman when he was 16. Although there is evidence that Reeves, who was the prime suspect in the rapes or attempted rapes of five other white women, was actually guilty, the case drew protests not due to questions about his guilt, but the racial disparities in sentencing. Martin Luther King Jr. noted that the controversy stemmed not from the question of guilt or innocence, but the clear racial disparities in sentencing that were further emphasized by Reeves's young age.

While refusing to get up, Colvin said she was thinking about a school paper she had written that day about Jim Crow laws and culture in Montgomery that prohibited Black people from using dressing rooms in department stores. "We couldn't try on clothes. You had to take a brown paper bag and draw a diagram of your foot ... and take it to the store", she said in a later interview.

"The bus was getting crowded, and I remember the bus driver looking through the rearview mirror asking her [Colvin] to get up for the white woman, which she didn't", said Annie Larkins Price, a classmate of Colvin. "She had been yelling, 'It's my constitutional right!'. She decided on that day that she wasn't going to move." Colvin recalled of the white woman, "If she sat down in the same row as me, it meant I was as good as her."

Colvin later said: "History kept me stuck to my seat. I felt the hand of Harriet Tubman pushing down on one shoulder and Sojourner Truth pushing down on the other." Colvin was handcuffed, arrested, and forcibly removed from the bus. She shouted that her constitutional rights were being violated. Colvin said, "But I made a personal statement, too, one that [Parks] didn't make and probably couldn't have made. Mine was the first cry for justice, and a loud one."

The police officers who took her to the station made sexual comments about her body and took turns guessing her bra size throughout the ride. After one officer jumped in the back seat of the police car, Colvin feared they would sexually assault her, and recalled: "I put my knees together and crossed my hands over my lap and started praying." Price testified for Colvin, who was tried in juvenile court. Colvin was initially charged with disturbing the peace, violating the segregation laws, and battering and assaulting a police officer. "There was no assault", Price said.

=== Aftermath ===
A group of black civil rights leaders, including Martin Luther King Jr., was organized to discuss Colvin's arrest with the police commissioner. She was bailed out by her minister, who told her that she had brought the revolution to Montgomery.

Through the trial, Colvin was represented by Fred Gray, a lawyer for the Montgomery Improvement Association (MIA), which was organizing civil rights actions. She was convicted on all three charges in juvenile court, and given a $10 fine. When Colvin's case was appealed to the Montgomery Circuit Court on May 6, 1955, the charges of disturbing the peace and violating the segregation laws were dropped, although her conviction for assaulting a police officer was upheld.

== Browder v. Gayle ==
Claudette Colvin was one of four plaintiffs in the first federal court case filed by civil rights attorney Fred Gray on February 1, 1956, Browder v. Gayle, which challenged bus segregation in Montgomery, Alabama. Colvin testified before a three-judge panel in the United States District Court that heard the case. On June 13, 1956, the court ruled that state and local laws enforcing bus segregation in Alabama were unconstitutional. The state appealed the decision to the United States Supreme Court, which upheld the lower court's ruling on November 13, 1956. One month later, the Supreme Court affirmed the order for Montgomery and the state of Alabama to end bus segregation. As a result, the Montgomery Bus Boycott, which had lasted over a year, was officially called off. The ruling ultimately led to the declaration that all segregation on public transportation was unconstitutional.

== Life after activism ==
Colvin gave birth to a son, Raymond, in March 1956. During the same year Colvin left Montgomery for New York City, because she had difficulty finding and keeping work following her participation in the federal court case that overturned bus segregation. Colvin stated she was branded a troublemaker by many in her community. She withdrew from college, and struggled in the local environment.

In New York, Colvin and her son Raymond initially lived with her older sister, Velma Colvin. In 1960, she gave birth to her second son, Randy. Claudette began a job in 1969 as a nurse's aide in a nursing home in Manhattan. She worked there for 35 years, retiring in 2004. Raymond Colvin died in 1993 in New York of a heart attack at the age of 37. Her son Randy is an accountant in Atlanta and father of Colvin's four grandchildren.

== Death ==
Colvin died under hospice care in Texas, on January 13, 2026, at the age of 86. Following a stay at Black's Funeral Home in Carthage, Texas, Colvin's funeral was held in Birmingham, Alabama, and she was buried in Birmingham's Mount Zion Cemetery.

== Legacy ==
Colvin was a predecessor to the Montgomery bus boycott movement of 1955, which gained national attention. However, she rarely told her story after moving to New York City. The discussions in the Black community began to shift toward black entrepreneurship rather than focusing solely on integration, although national civil rights legislation did not pass until 1964 and 1965. NPR's Margot Adler said that black organizations believed that Rosa Parks would be a better figure for a test case for integration because she was an adult, had a job, and had a middle-class appearance. They felt she had the maturity to handle being at the center of potential controversy.

Colvin was not the only woman of the Civil Rights Movement who was left out of the history books. In the south, male ministers made up the overwhelming majority of leaders. This was partially a product of the outward face the NAACP was trying to broadcast and partially a product of the women fearing losing their jobs, which were often in the public school system.

In 2005, Colvin told the Montgomery Advertiser that she would not have changed her decision to remain seated on the bus: "I feel very, very proud of what I did," she said. "I do feel like what I did was a spark and it caught on." "I'm not disappointed. Let the people know Rosa Parks was the right person for the boycott. But also let them know that the attorneys took four other women to the Supreme Court to challenge the law that led to the end of segregation."

In an interview in 1998 with Paul Hendrickson, Colvin reflected back on her protest and why she did what she did. She stated, "I was done talking about 'good hair' and 'good skin' but not addressing our grievances. I was tired of adults complaining about how badly they were treated and not doing anything about it. I'd had enough of just feeling angry about Jeremiah Reeves [a classmate who had been sentenced to death in 1953 on specious charges that he had sexually assaulted white women]. I was tired of hoping for justice. When the moment came I was ready."

On May 20, 2018, Congressman Joe Crowley honored Colvin for her lifetime commitment to public service with a Congressional Certificate and an American flag.

== Recognition ==
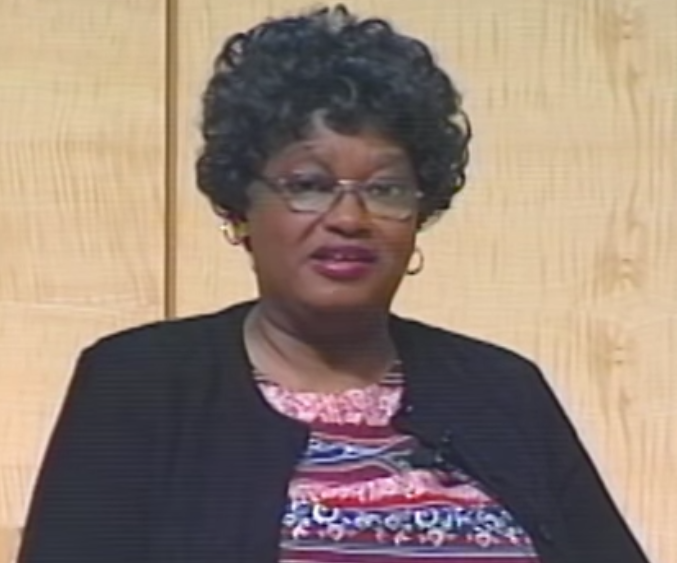
Colvin at the San Francisco Public Library, January 2005.

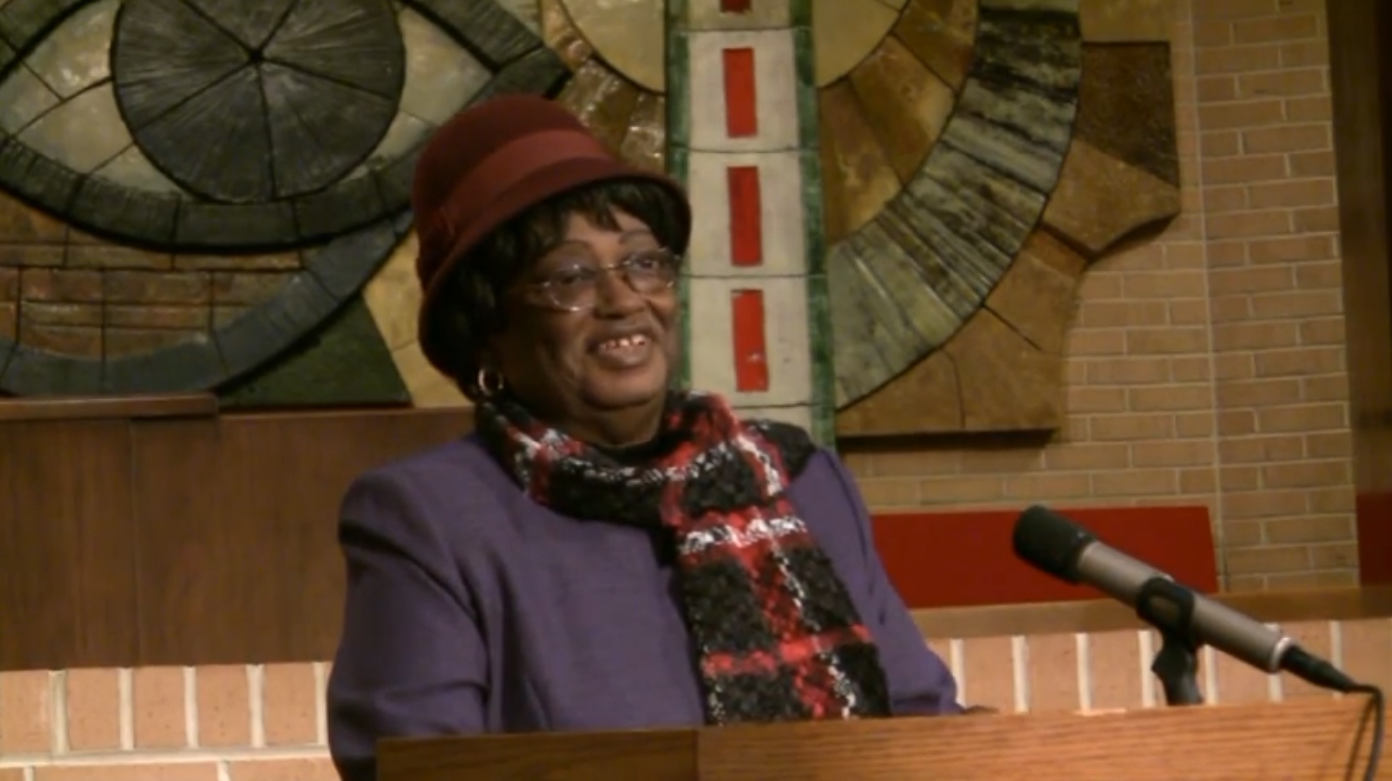
Colvin speaking at Bethany Baptist Church for Women's History Month, 2014

Colvin repeatedly said she was not angry that she did not get more recognition, just disappointed it took so long. Her role in Browder v. Gayle was largely ignored until she was a retiree, and she compared the eventual honor to "getting my Christmas in January rather than the 25th".

I don’t think there's room for many more icons. I think that history only has room enough for certain—you know, how many icons can you choose? [...] Most historians say Columbus discovered America, and it was already populated. But they don't say that Columbus discovered America; they should say, for the European people, that is, you know, their discovery of the new world.

— Claudette Colvin

In 2000, the Rosa Parks Museum was opened by Troy University at Montgomery. The lead curator asked Colvin if she would like to appear in a video to tell her story, and Colvin refused. She later explained, "This does not belong in a museum, because this struggle is not over. We still don't have all that we should have. And, personally, there can be no closure. They took away my life. If they want closure, they should give it to my grandchildren."

In 2010, the street Colvin lived on when she was a young girl was named Claudette Colvin Drive in her honor. It is located off Upper Wetumpka Road in Montgomery, Alabama.

After the opening of the National Museum of African American History and Culture in September 2016, Colvin and her family criticized the museum for overlooking key parts of civil rights history. She did not want Rosa Parks' story to be taken away, but argued that her own role, and that of the other three teenage plaintiffs in the Supreme Court case, deserved recognition. Colvin was not invited to the dedication ceremony of the museum. Colvin's sister Gloria Laster said, "Had it not been for Claudette Colvin, Aurelia Browder, Susie McDonald, and Mary Louise Smith, there may not have been a Thurgood Marshall, a Martin Luther King or a Rosa Parks."

Montgomery City Councilman Tracy Larkin, whose sister was on the bus in 1955 when Colvin was arrested, joined the efforts of several community members to honor Colvin. In 2017, the Council passed a resolution to establish an annual Claudette Colvin Day in Montgomery on March 2. In the proclamation, Mayor Todd Strange described her as "an early foot soldier in our civil rights" who ought to be thanked for "her leadership in the modern day". Colvin could not attend the proclamation due to health concerns.

In 2019, a statue of Rosa Parks was unveiled in Montgomery, Alabama, and four granite markers were also unveiled near the statue on the same day to honor the four plaintiffs in Browder v. Gayle, including Colvin.

In 2021, Colvin applied to the family court in Montgomery County, Alabama to have her juvenile record expunged. Daryl Bailey, the District Attorney for the county, supported her motion, stating: "Her actions back in March of 1955 were conscientious, not criminal; inspired, not illegal; they should have led to praise and not prosecution". The judge ordered that the juvenile record be expunged and destroyed in December 2021, stating that Colvin's refusal had "been recognized as a courageous act on her behalf and on behalf of a community of affected people".

Also in 2021, a mural honoring Colvin was unveiled, along Claudette Colvin Drive, in Montgomery, Alabama.

== In culture ==
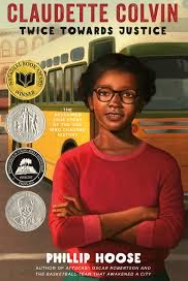
Cover of Phillip Hoose's Twice Towards Justice

Former US Poet Laureate Rita Dove memorialized Colvin in her poem "Claudette Colvin Goes To Work", published in her 1999 book On the Bus with Rosa Parks; folk singer John McCutcheon turned this poem into a song, which was first publicly performed in Charlottesville, Virginia's Paramount Theater in 2006.

Young adult book Claudette Colvin: Twice Toward Justice, by Phillip Hoose, was published in 2009 and won the National Book Award for Young People's Literature. The book, which featured many quotations from Colvin herself about her experiences, was based on 14 extended interviews conducted by Hoose with Colvin over the course of 2007.

A re-enactment of Colvin's resistance is portrayed in a 2014 episode of the comedy TV series Drunk History about Montgomery, Alabama. She was played by Mariah Wilson.

In the second season (2013) of the HBO drama series The Newsroom, the lead character, Will McAvoy (played by Jeff Daniels), uses Colvin's refusal to comply with segregation as an example of how "one thing" can change everything. He remarks that if the ACLU had used her act of civil disobedience, rather than that of Rosa Parks' eight months later, to highlight the injustice of segregation, a young preacher named Dr. Martin Luther King Jr. may never have attracted national attention, and America probably would not have had his voice for the Civil Rights Movement.

The Little-Known Heroes: Claudette Colvin, a children's picture book by Kaushay and Spencer Ford, was published in 2021. In 2022, a biopic of Colvin titled Spark written by Niceole R. Levy and directed by Anthony Mackie was announced, with Saniyya Sidney as Colvin.

== See also ==
- Aurelia Browder
- Charlotte L. Brown
- Dovey Johnson Roundtree
- E. D. Nixon
- Elizabeth Jennings Graham
- Irene Morgan
- Keys v. Carolina Coach Co.
- List of civil rights leaders
- Mary Louise Smith (activist)
- Susie McDonald
- Viola White
