= Susie McDonald =

American activist

Susie McDonald, also known as Miss Sue (c. 1878 – June 30, 1968) was an African American activist who served as one of the plaintiffs in the bus segregation lawsuit Browder v. Gayle (1956) in Montgomery, Alabama. She was arrested for violating bus segregation law on October 21, 1955. According to Alabama Vital Records, she was born Susan Coleman and married Thomas Lamar McDonald on June 12, 1894. She was a widow at the time of her arrest, 77, walked with a cane, and was light-skinned enough to be mistaken for white by bus operators, though she enjoyed correcting this misconception. Her husband Tom had done railroad work, and she received his pension.

In the 1950s, the McDonald family were the owners of a pavilion near Cleveland Avenue, known to black people as McDonald's Farm, where they could go without fear of racist violence. It may be, as family lore has it, that the McDonalds were able to buy the land in the 19th century because they were thought to be white.

Susie died on June 30, 1968. In 2019, a statue of Rosa Parks was unveiled in Montgomery, Alabama, and four granite markers were also unveiled near the statue on the same day to honor four plaintiffs in Browder v. Gayle, including Susie McDonald.

== See also ==
- Elizabeth Jennings Graham
- Charlotte L. Brown
- Aurelia Browder
- Claudette Colvin
- Irene Morgan
- Mary Louise Smith (activist)
- Viola White
