= Rosa Parks =

American civil rights activist (1913–2005)

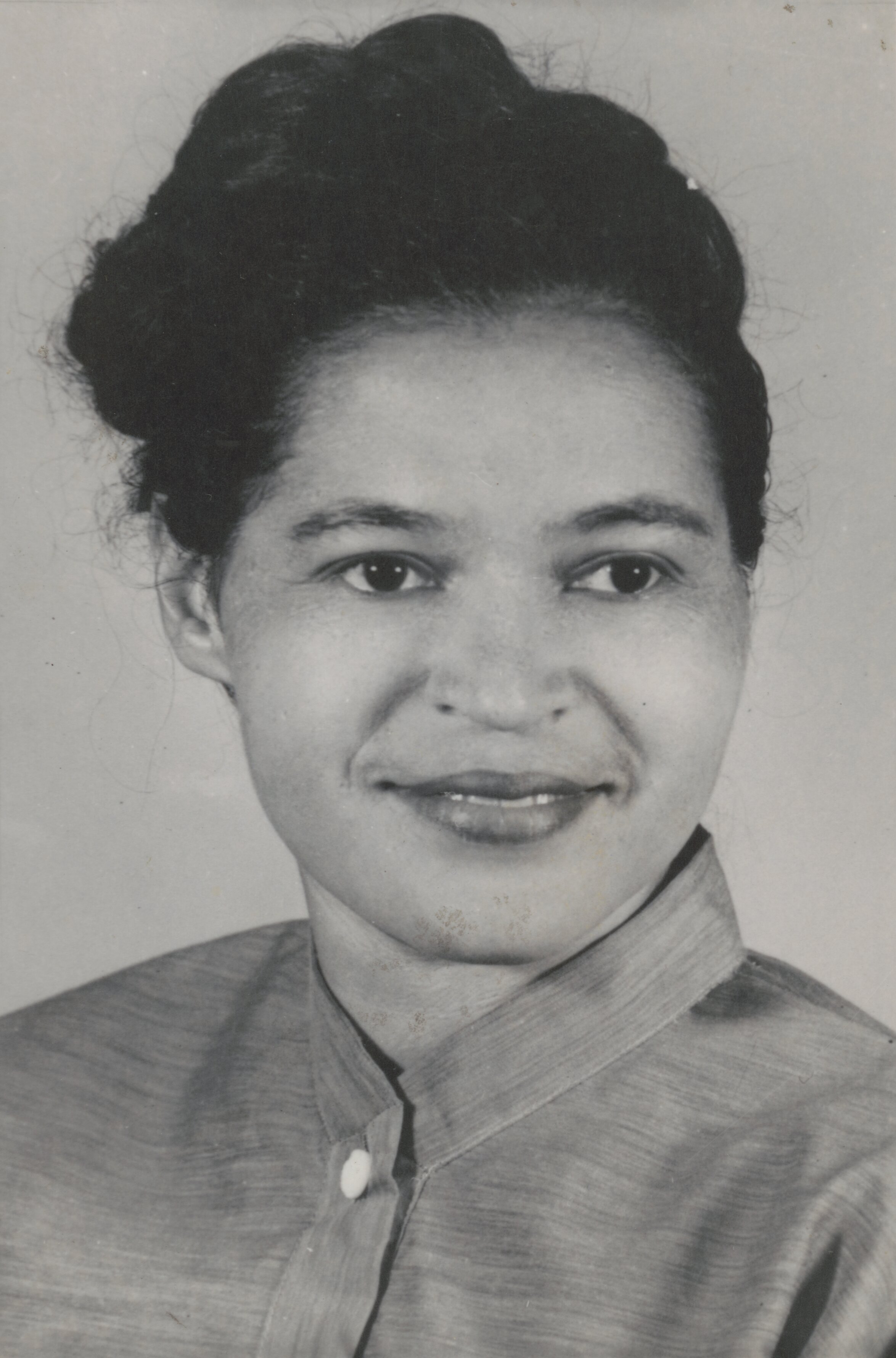
- Parks in 1956
- Born: Rosa Louise McCauley; February 4, 1913; Tuskegee, Alabama, U.S.
- Died: October 24, 2005 (aged 92); Detroit, Michigan, U.S.
- Burial place: Woodlawn Cemetery, Detroit
- Occupation: Civil rights activist
- Known for: Montgomery bus boycott
- Movement: Civil Rights Movement
- Spouse: Raymond Parks (m. 1932; died 1977)

Rosa Louise McCauley Parks (February 4, 1913 – October 24, 2005) was an American civil rights activist. She is best known for her 1955 refusal to move from her seat on a bus in Montgomery, Alabama, in defiance of Jim Crow racial segregation laws, which sparked the Montgomery bus boycott. She is sometimes known as the "mother of the civil rights movement".

Born in Tuskegee, Alabama, Parks grew up under Jim Crow segregation. She later moved to Montgomery and joined the city's chapter of the National Association for the Advancement of Colored People (NAACP) in 1943, serving as the organization's secretary. Despite policies designed to disenfranchise Black citizens, Parks successfully registered to vote after three separate attempts between 1943 and 1945. She investigated and organized campaigns around cases of racial and sexual violence in her capacity as NAACP secretary, including those of Recy Taylor and Jeremiah Reeves, laying the groundwork for future civil rights campaigns.

Custom in Montgomery required Black passengers to surrender their seats in the front of the bus to accommodate white riders. The rows in the back were designated for Black riders. Before Parks's refusal to move, several Black Montgomerians had refused to do so, including 15-year-old high school student Claudette Colvin, leading to arrests. When Parks was arrested in 1955, local leaders were searching for a person who would be a good legal test case against segregation. She was deemed a suitable candidate, and the Women's Political Council (WPC) organized a one-day bus boycott on the day of her trial. The boycott was widespread. Many Black Montgomerians refused to ride the buses that day. After Parks was found guilty of violating state law, the boycott was extended indefinitely, with the Montgomery Improvement Association (MIA) organizing its own community transportation network to sustain it. Parks and other boycott leaders faced harassment, ostracization, and various legal obstacles. The boycott lasted for 381 days, finally concluding after segregation on buses was deemed unconstitutional in the court case Browder v. Gayle.

After the boycott ended, Parks experienced financial hardship and health problems due, in part, to her participation. In 1957, she relocated to Detroit, Michigan. She continued to advocate for civil rights, supporting people such as John Conyers, Joanne Little, Gary Tyler, Angela Davis, Joe Madison, and Nelson Mandela. She was also a supporter of the Black power movement and an anti-apartheid activist, participating in protests and conferences as part of the Free South Africa Movement. In 1987, she co-founded the Rosa and Raymond Parks Institute for Self Development with Elaine Eason Steele. After Parks's death in 2005, she was honored with public viewings and memorial services in three cities: in Montgomery; in Washington, D.C., where she lay in state at the United States Capitol rotunda; and in Detroit, where she was ultimately interred at Woodlawn Cemetery. Parks received many awards and honors, both throughout her life and posthumously. She received the Presidential Medal of Freedom and a Congressional Gold Medal and was the first Black American to be memorialized in the National Statuary Hall.

== Early life ==
Rosa Parks was born Rosa Louise McCauley on February 4, 1913, in Tuskegee, Alabama. Her mother, Leona (née Edwards), was a teacher from Pine Level, Alabama. Her father, James McCauley, was a carpenter and mason from Abbeville, Alabama. Her name was a portmanteau of her maternal and paternal grandmothers' names: Rose and Louisa. In addition to her African ancestry, one of her great-grandfathers was of Scotch-Irish descent, and one of her great-grandmothers was of partial Native American ancestry. Her maternal grandfather, Sylvester Edwards, was the child of an enslaved woman and a plantation owner's son.

When she was a baby, Parks moved from Tuskegee to live with her father's family in Abbeville. When Parks and her parents arrived, the house became too crowded, and Parks's father was seldom home because of the itinerant nature of his job. As a result, Parks's mother left Abbeville with her, and the two relocated to Pine Level to live with Parks's mother's family. In Pine Level, Parks attended the African Methodist Episcopal (AME) church, a century-old independent Black denomination founded by free Blacks in Philadelphia, Pennsylvania, in the early nineteenth century. Baptized at age two, she remained a member of the church throughout her life.

Her mother worked as a teacher in the nearby community of Spring Hill, where she lived during the week. While her mother was away, Parks lived with her grandparents on their family farm, where they grew fruit, pecan, and walnut trees and raised chickens and cows. At the age of six or seven, she began working on the plantation of Moses Hudson, who paid Black children 50 cents a day to pick cotton. Parks also learned quilting and sewing from her mother, completing her first quilt at the age of 10 and her first dress at 11.

Growing up in Alabama, Parks faced a society characterized by racial segregation and violence. Alabama and other southern states began implementing segregationist policies during the 1870s and 1880s, shortly after the end of the Civil War in 1865, culminating in a 1901 state constitutional convention that formally codified Jim Crow segregation into law. This system enforced racial separation in nearly all aspects of life, including financial institutions, healthcare, religious facilities, burial grounds, and public transportation. Acts of racist violence were also widespread, with the Ku Klux Klan intensifying its activity in Pine Level and across the United States after the end of World War I. Parks later recalled that she "heard of a lot of black people being found dead" under mysterious circumstances during her childhood.

Parks initially attended a one-room schoolhouse at the local Mount Zion AME Zion church. When she was eleven or twelve, she began attending the Montgomery Industrial School for Girls, where she received vocational training. After the school closed in 1928, she transferred to Booker T. Washington Junior High School, a segregated public school. She then attended a laboratory school set up by the Alabama State Teachers College for Negroes, but dropped out to care for her ailing grandmother and mother.

After leaving school, Parks worked on her family's farm and as a domestic worker in white households. Black women in Alabama who worked as domestic workers often experienced sexual violence. During the 1950s or '60s, Parks wrote an account of an incident where a white man named "Mr. Charlie" tried to sexually assault her. In her account, she claims that she verbally resisted Mr. Charlie's advances and denounced his racism. The account concludes with her trying to ignore him while reading a newspaper. Though the account may have been partially or entirely fictionalized, biographer Jeanne Theoharis notes that many of the elements of the account "correspond to Parks's life", speculating that Parks "wrote [the account] as an allegory to suggest larger themes of domination and resistance", or that, "given that more than twenty-five years had passed before she wrote [the account] down, she augmented what she said to Charlie that evening with all the points that she had wished to make as she resisted his advances".

In 1931, when she was 18, Rosa was introduced to her future husband, Raymond Parks, by a mutual friend. He was 28. She was initially "[not] very interested in him" because of "some unhappy romantic experiences" (Note: Mace speculates that this may refer to some form of sexual violence.) and because of his light skin. Raymond eventually persuaded Parks to ride with him in his car. At the time, automobile ownership was rare among Black men in Alabama. Parks described Raymond as the "first real activist" she had met, admiring his opposition to racial prejudice. The two married on December 18, 1932, at Rosa's mother's house. Soon after, they moved to a rooming house in the Centennial Hill neighborhood of Montgomery.

=== Early activism ===
After their marriage, Rosa and Raymond became involved in the Scottsboro Boys case, concerning a group of nine Black youths falsely accused of raping two white women on a train in Paint Rock, Alabama. The nine were tried in Scottsboro, Alabama, where they were sentenced to death by electrocution. To raise support for their defense, Rosa and Raymond hosted fundraising meetings and gatherings for Scottsboro legal defenders at their house. According to historian Robin Kelley, the couple also attended meetings of the Communist Party USA, which helped bring attention to the Scottsboro Boys case.

In 1933, Parks completed her high school education with encouragement from Raymond. At the time in Alabama, only 7% of Black people held a high school diploma. Subsequently, she worked as a nurse's aide at St. Margaret's Hospital, sewing to supplement her income. In 1941, she began working at Maxwell Air Force Base, a training facility for air force cadets. The base was fully integrated, and Parks was able to take public transit alongside her white coworkers on-base. However, when she returned home, she was required to use segregated buses, which frustrated her. According to Parks, her time at Maxwell "opened her eyes up", providing an "alternative reality to the ugly racial policies of Jim Crow".

Parks began attending meetings of the Montgomery chapter of the National Association for the Advancement of Colored People (NAACP) in 1943 after seeing a picture of a former classmate of hers, Johnnie Carr, at a meeting. In December 1943, she was elected secretary of the chapter. Parks later explained that she accepted the role (which was considered a woman's position at the time) because "I was the only woman there, and they needed a secretary, and I was too timid to say no". She and Raymond were also members of the Voter's League, a local organization focused on increasing Black voter registration.

There were several obstacles preventing Black people from registering to vote in Alabama during this period, including poll taxes, literacy tests, intrusive questions on voter registration applications, and retaliation by employers. In 1940, less than 0.1% of Black Montgomerians were registered to vote. Encouraged by NAACP activist E. D. Nixon, Parks attempted to register three times beginning in 1943, succeeding in 1945.

In her capacity as secretary, Parks began investigating the gang rape of Recy Taylor, a Black woman from Abbeville, in 1944. After a grand jury declined to indict the perpetrators, Parks and other civil rights activists organized "The Committee for Equal Justice for Mrs. Recy Taylor", launching "the strongest campaign for equal justice to be seen in a decade", according to The Chicago Defender. The campaign, which received nationwide attention, put pressure on Governor Chauncey Sparks to take steps to prosecute Taylor's assailants. Sparks ultimately promised to investigate the case. The state failed to secure indictments for the assailants after a second grand jury hearing in 1945.

Despite this, historian Danielle L. McGuire describes the movement for justice in the Recy Taylor case as "the largest and best organized of many efforts to draw attention to the ruthless heart of the racial caste system", arguing that it "brought the building blocks of the Montgomery bus boycott together a decade earlier and kept them in place". Parks also organized support for Jeremiah Reeves, who was accused of raping a white woman in 1952. Reeves was ultimately executed in 1957.

Beginning in 1954, Parks worked as a seamstress for Clifford and Virginia Durr, a white couple. Politically liberal and opposed to segregation, the Durrs became her friends. They encouraged, and eventually helped sponsor, Parks to attend the Highlander Folk School, an activist training center in Monteagle, Tennessee, in the summer of 1955. There, Parks was mentored by the veteran organizer Septima Clark. Parks enjoyed her time at Highlander, where Black and white people worked, cooked, and lived together as equals. She later remembered it as one of the rare moments in her life when she felt no racial hostility and the first time in her adult life that she could envision a "unified society", describing how "people of all races and backgrounds" interacted harmoniously. In August 1955, she attended a Montgomery meeting concerning the lynching of Emmett Till. According to Theoharis, Parks was "heartened by the attention that people managed to get to the [Till] case", since the custom was to "keep things covered up".

== Arrest and bus boycott ==
=== Montgomery buses: law and prevailing customs ===
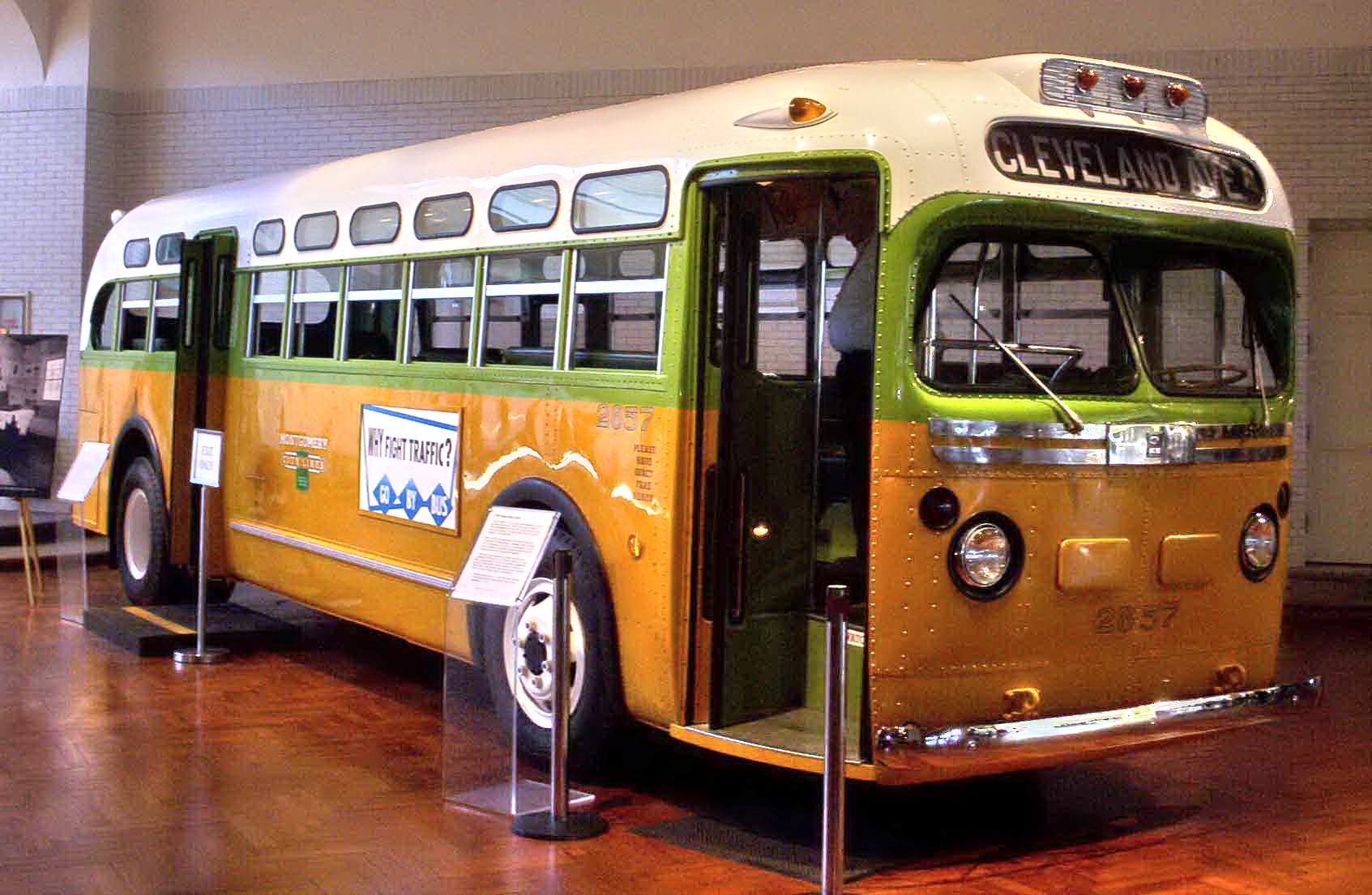
The No. 2857 bus on which Parks was riding before her arrest is now a museum exhibit at the Henry Ford Museum.

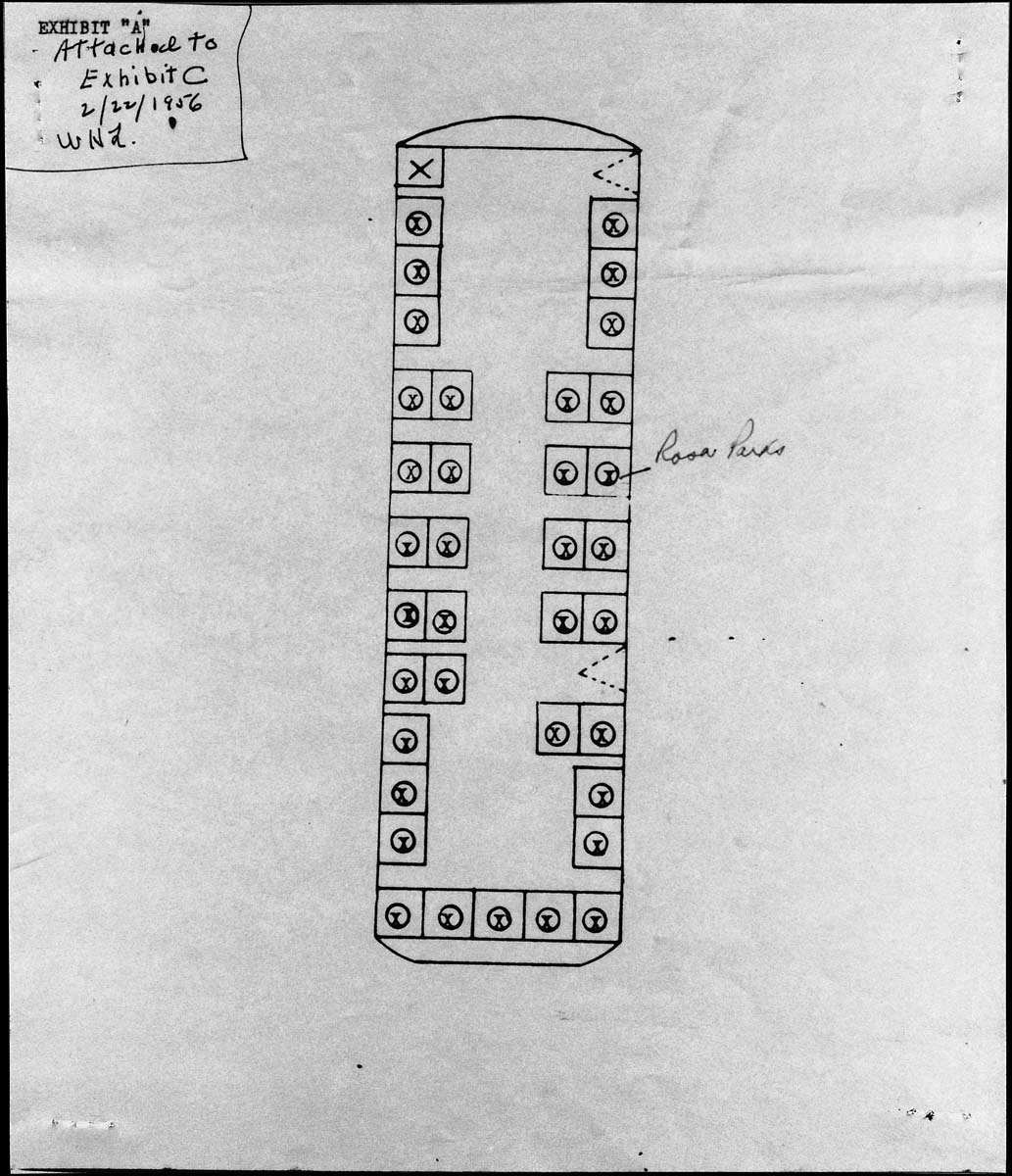
The seat layout on the bus where Parks sat, December 1, 1955

Montgomery passed a city ordinance segregating streetcar passengers by race in 1900, before state-wide segregation was implemented. Montgomery's Black residents conducted boycotts against segregated streetcars between 1900 and 1902, coinciding with similar boycotts and protests in other southern cities. The boycotts resulted in an amendment to the city ordinance, which stipulated that "no rider had to surrender a seat unless another was available". However, many drivers failed to follow the ordinance. Altercations between bus drivers and Black passengers were frequent. According to historian Cheryl Phibbs, "bus drivers were given policeman-like authority to determine where racial divisions were enforced". They were also generally armed.

Black people constituted a majority of bus riders in Montgomery. According to the Women's Political Council, a Montgomery-based advocacy group, "three-fourths of the riders" on Montgomery buses were Black. Despite this, the front rows on each Montgomery bus were reserved for white passengers, while the back rows were designated for Black passengers. Segregation in the middle rows was enforced at the driver's discretion. While city ordinances did not require patrons to give up their seats, bus drivers frequently demanded Black passengers do so to accommodate white riders. Furthermore, Black passengers were sometimes required to pay their fares at the front of the bus, then exit and re-board through the back door.

In 1943, bus driver James F. Blake confronted Parks when she tried to take her seat from the front of the bus, insisting that she re-board in the back. Parks refused, telling Blake that she was "already on the bus and didn't see the need of getting off and getting back on when people were standing in the stepwell". After Blake grabbed her sleeve, Parks moved to the front of the bus, sitting in one of the rows reserved for white passengers, where she dropped her purse. Blake told her to "get off [his] bus", appearing poised to assault her. Parks admonished Blake, saying that he "better not hit [her]". She then exited the bus without re-boarding. After this encounter, she typically avoided riding on Blake's bus.

=== Refusal to move ===
Rosa Parks's arrest

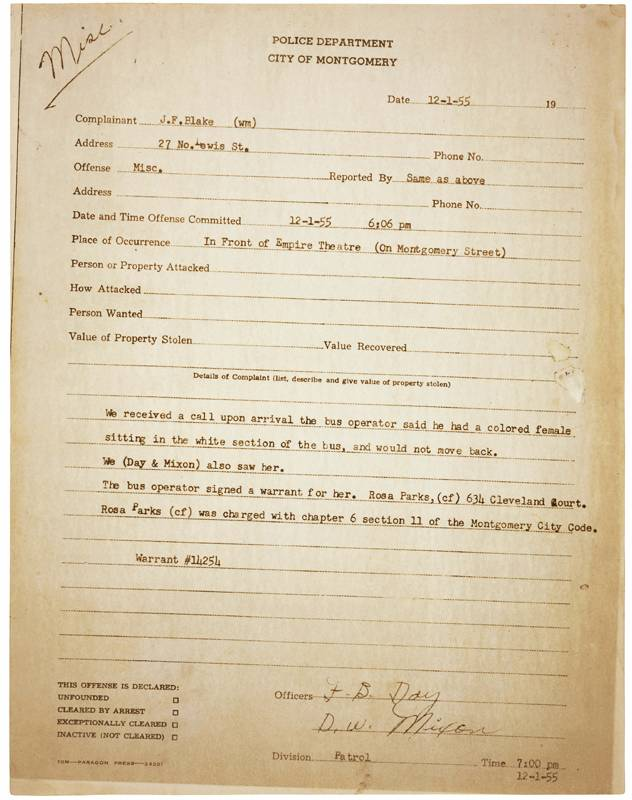
Police report on Parks, December 1, 1955, page 1

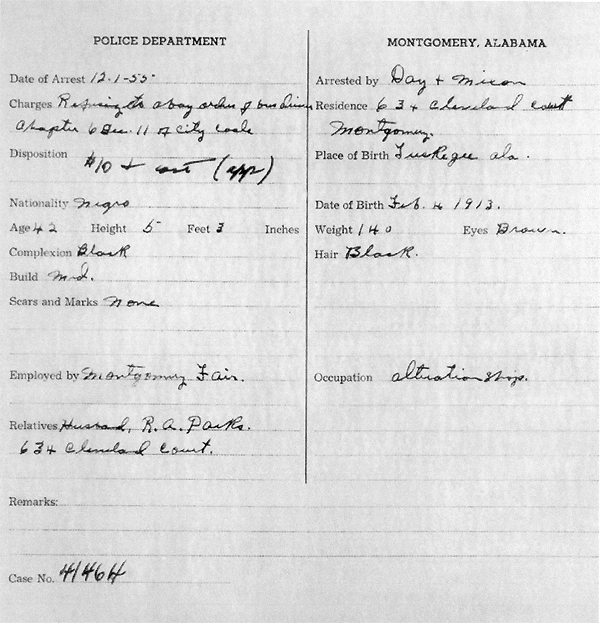
Police report on Parks, December 1, 1955, page 2

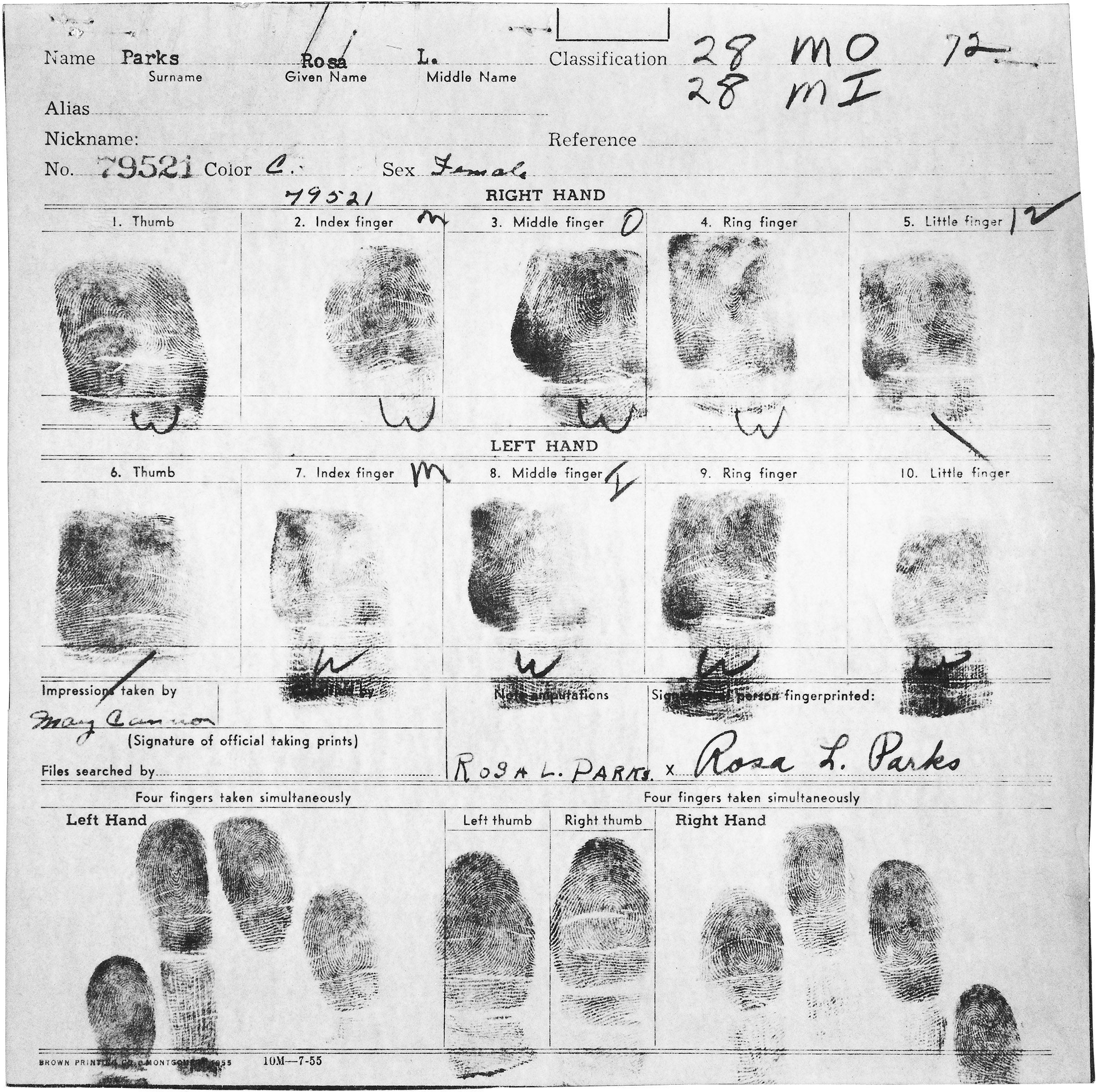
Fingerprint card of Parks from her arrest on December 1, 1955

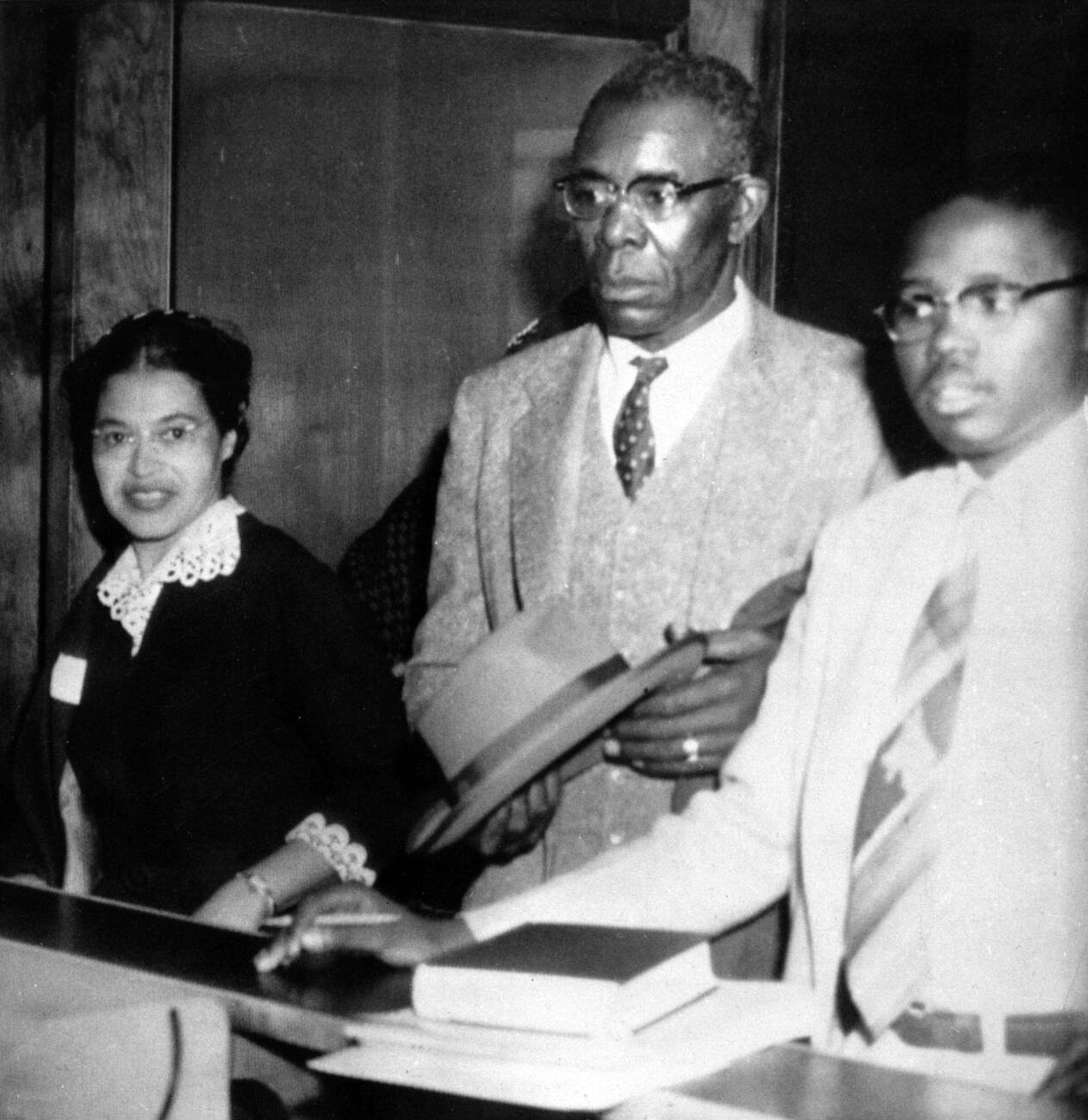
Rosa Parks with E. D. Nixon and attorney Fred Gray posting bond on December 5, 1955 following her arrest.

Before December 1955, several people were arrested for declining to give up their seats on Montgomery buses. Maxwell Air Force Base employee Viola White was arrested in 1944, and Mary Wingfield was arrested in 1949. Teenager Mary Louise Smith was arrested in October 1954. In March 1955, Claudette Colvin, a fifteen-year-old student at Booker T. Washington High School, was also arrested. Other arrests included Aurelia Browder on April 29, 1955, and Susie McDonald on October 21, 1955.

Smith, Colvin, Browder, and McDonald were the plaintiffs in the 1956 lawsuit Browder v. Gayle. Many Black riders rallied around the idea of a boycott in the aftermath of Colvin's arrest. Black activists, including members of the WPC and NAACP, considered Colvin and Smith as test cases for a community bus boycott. The WPC was particularly focused on bus integration, partly because it was an issue that significantly affected Black women. Both the WPC and NAACP ultimately determined that Colvin and Smith were not suitable candidates for such a test case.

At 5:00 p.m. on December 1, 1955, Parks left work and purchased several items from Lee's Cut-Rate Drug before walking to Court Square to wait for her bus. She boarded the bus at around 5:30. Lost in thought, she did not notice that James F. Blake was the driver. Parks later stated that if she had noticed Blake, she would not have boarded. She paid her fare and went to sit in the middle section of the bus, next to a Black man and across from two Black women. Her chronic bursitis was causing her significant discomfort, particularly in her shoulders.

As the bus traveled along its regular route, all the white-only seats in the bus filled up. The bus reached the third stop in front of the Empire Theater, and several white passengers boarded. One man was forced to stand. Blake then demanded that Black passengers in the middle row yield their seats. Those seated near Parks complied, but Parks remained seated. According to Parks:

I felt that, if I did stand up, it meant that I approved of the way I was being treated, and I did not approve.

When Blake asked if she intended to stand, Parks refused. Blake threatened her with arrest, to which Parks responded: "You may do that." She considered physically resisting, but decided against it, as she "didn't have any way of fighting back". Blake then left the bus and called his supervisor from a nearby payphone. His supervisor advised him to call the police. Two officers arrived on the scene, and, at the insistence of Blake, arrested Parks for violating the Montgomery municipal code.

According to biographer Douglas G. Brinkley, Parks's refusal to move was not premeditated. Parks's former classmate, Mary Fair Burks, also clarified that Parks was not acting on behalf of the NAACP, as she "would have done so openly and demanded a group action on the part of the organization". Parks said of her refusal to move:

People always say that I didn't give up my seat because I was tired, but that isn't true. I was not tired physically, or no more tired than I usually was at the end of a working day. I was not old, although some people have an image of me as being old then. I was forty-two. No, the only tired I was, was tired of giving in.

After her arrest, Parks was taken to Montgomery city hall, where she filled out her arrest forms. She was then taken to the city jail, where she was fingerprinted and photographed. After repeated requests, she was granted permission to call home, notifying her mother of her arrest and asking for Raymond to come. E. D. Nixon was also informed of Parks's arrest and drove to the jail with Clifford and Virginia Durr, where he paid Parks's bail.

=== Montgomery bus boycott ===
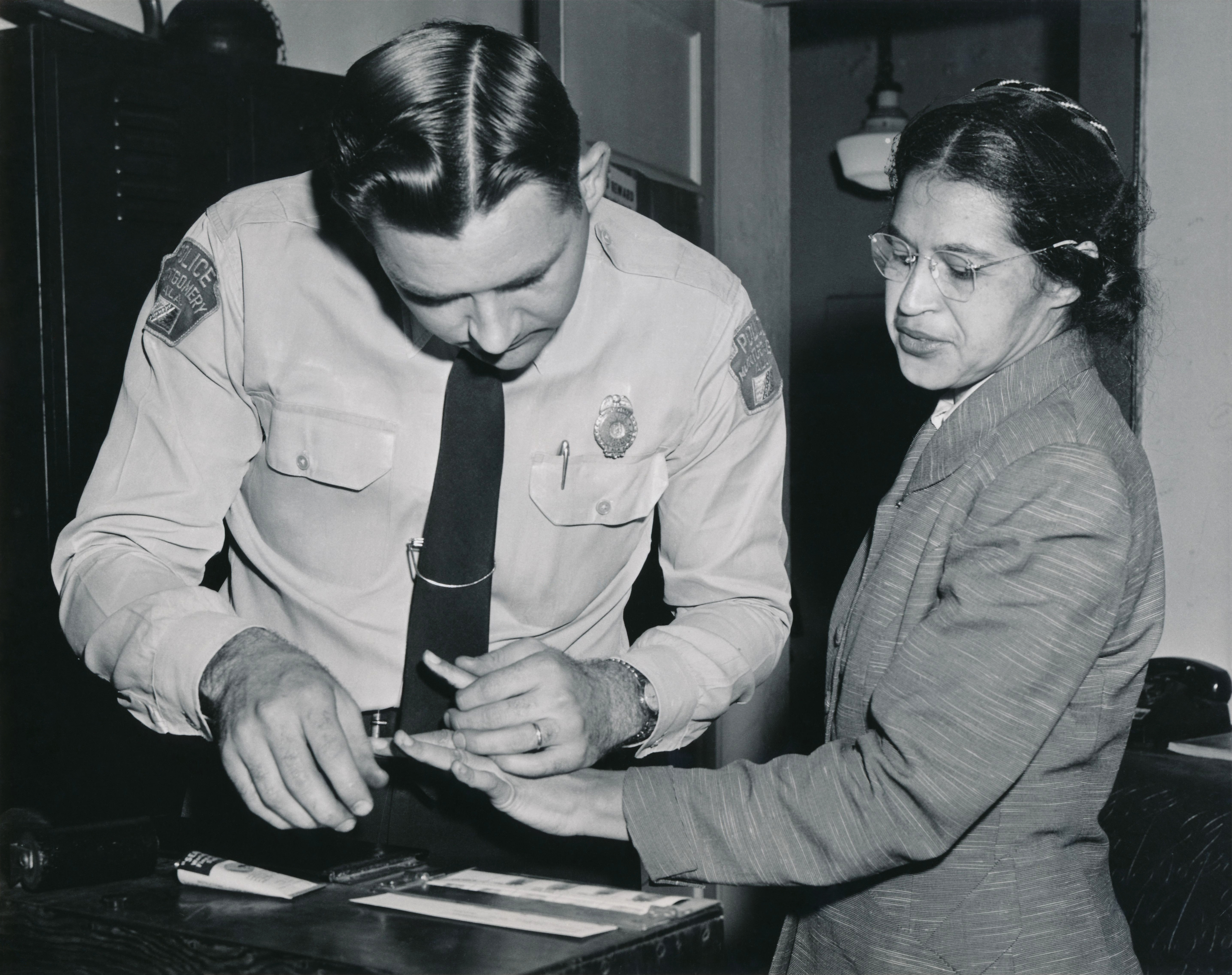
Parks was fingerprinted on February 22, 1956, after being arrested again alongside other organizers (Note: A contemporary news story from the New York Daily News puts the number indicted at 113 and the number arrested at 73. According to Hanson, 89 were indicted and 75 were arrested. According to Mace, the city was prepared to arrest 115, but 89 were ultimately indicted, and 75 were arrested.) for orchestrating the Montgomery bus boycott.

After Parks's arrest, Nixon conferred with Clifford Durr about the possibility of adopting Parks's arrest as a test case. The two favored Parks because of her high standing in the Black community, her respectable manners, and her "firm quiet spirit", which, according to Durr, "would be needed for the long battle ahead". After being approached by Nixon to be a test case, Parks consulted with her family. Despite concerns about potential violent retaliation, she ultimately agreed. Attorney Fred Gray agreed to represent Parks in court, and WPC president Jo Ann Robinson was notified of the case. The WPC began planning for a one-day boycott of Montgomery buses on December 5, 1955, the day of Parks's trial. Under the guise of grading exams, Robinson collaborated with two students at Alabama State College to produce 35,000 leaflets announcing the boycott using a mimeograph provided by the college's business chair, John Cannon.

WPC members distributed the leaflets throughout the Black community, and Nixon enlisted the support of several members of the local Black clergy, including Martin Luther King Jr, who was the pastor of Dexter Avenue Baptist Church. A planning meeting including members of the Black clergy was held at the church on December 2. While about half of the clergy in attendance left the meeting partway through, not wanting to be associated with politics, half stayed, and plans were drafted for alternative transportation during the boycott, including carpooling networks and collaboration with local taxi drivers. More leaflets were created at the meeting and, in the following days, were distributed by King and pastor Ralph Abernathy at bars and clubs. Many Black pastors announced the boycott in their churches on Sunday, December 4. It was further publicized by media coverage in the Montgomery Advertiser and on local television.

Despite attempts by Montgomery police officers to organize escorts for Black passengers, who they thought might fear retaliation from the Black community, bus ridership was low on the day of Parks's trial. Many Black residents walked or carpooled. The trial took place in the courtroom at Montgomery city hall, and almost 500 Black Montgomerians attended. Parks pleaded "not guilty" and, though she did not testify, two witnesses (Note: According to Mace, there was one witness who testified to there being open seats. According to Brinkley and Theoharis, there were two such witnesses.) corroborated that there were seats available when she refused to move.

The prosecution moved to indict Parks on state charges rather than municipal charges. The presiding judge permitted the change, and Parks was found guilty of violating state law. She was fined $10, plus $4 in court fees (equivalent to $168 in 2025). The trial took between five and thirty minutes. (Note: The trial took five minutes according to Brinkley and Phibbs and 30 according to Theoharis.) Gray immediately filed to appeal the ruling, while Nixon addressed the crowd assembled outside, urging them to remain nonviolent and leave city hall.

While Parks handled telephone communications at Gray's office, boycott organizers gathered at Mount Zion AME Zion Church that afternoon to discuss prolonging the boycott and plan a mass meeting at Holt Street Baptist Church scheduled for that evening. They formed the Montgomery Improvement Association (MIA) to oversee the boycott, electing King as leader. The evening meeting was attended by 15,000 people. Nixon and King gave speeches, while Abernathy read the demands of the organizers to the crowd:

1. Courteous treatment on the buses;
2. First-come, first-served seating with whites in front and blacks in back;
3. Hiring of black drivers for the black bus routes.

He then asked them to stand if they supported a continued boycott. The crowd overwhelmingly did so. Parks, hailed by King as a "heroine", asked if she should address the crowd, who repeatedly called for her to speak. However, she was told by "someone" that she had "said enough" and did not speak that evening. Theoharis interprets this as being indicative of the male-dominated culture of the civil rights movement.

At a December 6 press conference, King declared that the boycott would continue until all demands had been satisfied. At a meeting on December 8, city and bus company officials dismissed the MIA's demands. The MIA began developing a parallel transportation network for Black Montgomerians to support the boycott. Parks served temporarily as a dispatcher, coordinating transportation within the MIA's ride-sharing system. She was ostracized by her coworkers at Montgomery Fair, where she worked as a seamstress. In January 1956, she was fired.

A week later, Raymond was also fired from his job at Maxwell Air Force Base. That same month, Montgomery Police Commissioner Clyde Sellers initiated a "Get Tough" policy, harassing Black pedestrians and boycott participants. Boycott organizers, including Parks, received regular death threats. In February, a state grand jury declared the boycott illegal, indicting several of the boycott's leaders, including Parks, many of whom were arrested. Amid protests at the courthouse, the arrestees were released on bond. Ultimately, only King was tried after the indictment. The boycott continued.

Responding to a plan by city officials to stall Parks's case in state circuit courts, Gray filed suit in federal district court. Parks was initially included as a plaintiff in this case but was eventually removed to avoid federal dismissal on the grounds that her case was already being heard in Alabama's state court. In the end, the federal case (excluding Parks) was brought before the U.S. Supreme Court as Browder v. Gayle, which ruled the statute mandating segregation of Montgomery buses unconstitutional. Later, before a district court, the Supreme Court's ruling was upheld. After rejecting appeals by the city of Montgomery and state of Alabama, the Supreme Court ordered the integration of Montgomery's buses on December 20, 1956. King called off the boycott that day, 381 days after it took effect.

== Later years ==
=== Late 1950s ===
After being fired from their jobs, Rosa and Raymond faced significant financial hardship, particularly after their landlord implemented a monthly rent increase of $10. In February 1956, King issued a memorandum requesting a $250–$300 disbursement for Parks from the MIA relief fund. The funds were authorized. Parks continued to struggle. She developed severe health problems, including chronic insomnia, stomach ulcers, and a heart condition. Despite this, she traveled throughout the year, including in March to Detroit, Michigan. While there, she visited her brother and addressed United Auto Workers (UAW) Local 600 in a departure from the mainstream NAACP, who opposed trade union affiliations.

In 1957, after the end of the boycott, Virginia Durr offered her a position at Highlander Folk School in hopes of organizing a Black voter registration campaign in Montgomery. Parks declined, citing the school's location in Tennessee and concerns about potential reprisals if she were to speak in Alabama, Mississippi, or Louisiana. She also disagreed with King and the emerging Southern Christian Leadership Conference (SCLC) regarding their impending airport desegregation campaign. Tensions between King and Nixon caused a rift in the MIA, with Parks taking Nixon's side. Tensions developed between Nixon and Parks as well, and her health further deteriorated. In August 1957, prompted by economic insecurity, threats to her safety, and divisions within the MIA leadership, she left Montgomery for Detroit, where her brother, Sylvester, and her cousins, Thomas Williamson and Annie Cruse, lived. The MIA, embarrassed by her decision to move, raised $500 for her as a "going-away present".

Upon arriving in Detroit, Rosa, Raymond, and Rosa's mother lived with Rosa's cousin before renting an apartment on Euclid Avenue. For a brief period beginning in October 1957, Parks moved to Hampton, Virginia to work at a Holly Tree Inn as a hostess. She returned to Detroit in December. She and her family continued to struggle financially. They lost their apartment in 1959 and moved into a meeting hall for the Progressive Civic League (PCL), a local Black professional organization. Rosa managed the treasury at the PCL's credit union while Raymond served as the meeting hall's caretaker.

=== 1960s ===
In early 1960, Parks's health further deteriorated, requiring multiple surgeries. She and her family accrued significant debt due to unpaid medical bills. She received donations from the MIA and PCL, and the Black press began to write about her financial difficulties. In 1961, after her health improved and she found employment at Stockton Sewing Company, the family moved to a flat on Virginia Park Street in Detroit. Raymond also secured employment at a local barber shop.

Throughout the 1960s, Parks remained active in the civil rights movement. She was an honorary member of the SCLC, and sometimes attended meetings, including the 1962 SCLC convention in Birmingham, Alabama. In August 1963, she traveled to Washington, D.C., to take part in the March on Washington. More than 250,000 people participated in the march, and Parks was honored alongside other prominent women in the civil rights struggle during the event's "Tribute to Women" segment. The march has been criticized for its lack of women's representation, as no women were included in the delegation that was sent to meet with the Kennedy administration. Parks said of the event that it was "a great occasion, but women were not allowed to play much of a role".

Parks played a critical role in John Conyers's 1964 congressional campaign. She persuaded King, who was generally reluctant to endorse local candidates, to appear with Conyers, boosting the novice candidate's profile. When Conyers was elected, he hired her as a secretary and receptionist for his congressional office in Detroit. As part of her position, Parks engaged with Conyers's constituents, focusing on addressing socio-economic issues such as welfare, education, job discrimination, and affordable housing. Through regular visits to schools, hospitals, senior citizen facilities, and community gatherings, she ensured Conyers remained connected to grassroots concerns. Conyers later recalled of Parks that "you treated her with deference because she was so quiet, so serene—just a very special person".

Parks attended the 1965 Selma to Montgomery marches, joined the Lowndes County Freedom Organization, and supported the Freedom Now Party. She was an admirer of Nation of Islam spokesman Malcolm X and "armed self defense" advocate Robert F. Williams, befriending Williams after his return from China, where he had been invited to visit by Chairman Mao Zedong. In a 1967 interview, she said that she "[did not] believe in gradualism or that whatever should be done for the better should take forever to do". In the wake of the 1967 Detroit riot, Parks spoke in support of rioters, comparing the "burning and looting" of the riot with her own actions during the Montgomery bus boycott. Later, after the assassination of Martin Luther King Jr., she attended protests as part of the Memphis sanitation strike. She also took part in the Black power movement, attending the Philadelphia Black power conference in 1968.

=== 1970s ===
Parks continued to support the Black power movement throughout the 1970s, attending the National Black Political Convention in Gary, Indiana in 1972. She also advocated for political prisoners, playing a key role in the establishment of the Detroit chapter of the Joanne Little Defense Committee. Little, who was incarcerated, was charged with killing her jailer, Clarence Alligood, while he was sexually assaulting her. After national outcry around her case, Little was acquitted in July 1975. Parks also organized on behalf of Gary Tyler, who was wrongfully (Note: Although he accepted a manslaughter plea as a condition of his release, Tyler continues to assert his innocence. Many sources, including Theoharis, Nowakowski, Vargas, and Benor, consider Tyler's conviction wrongful.) convicted of shooting of a 13-year-old white boy while being attacked by a group of white segregationists. Tyler was ultimately freed in 2016, after 41 years in prison. Parks also advocated for the Wilmington 10 and Imari Obadele of the Republic of New Africa (RNA) and spoke in support of Angela Davis, introducing her to a crowd of 12,000 as a "dear sister who has endured significant persecution" after Davis's acquittal in the kidnapping and murder case of Judge Harold Haley.

Parks continued to experience health problems throughout the 1970s and was injured several times after falling on ice. She also experienced personal losses, with Raymond dying of throat cancer in 1977 and her brother Sylvester dying of stomach cancer soon after. These personal struggles caused her to gradually withdraw from the civil rights movement. She learned of the death of Fannie Lou Hamer, once a close friend, from a newspaper, lamenting that Hamer was "dead quite before [she] knew of it", and that "no one mentioned it to [her]". Without support from her husband and unable to afford a nurse, Parks relocated her elderly mother first to a retirement facility, then to a senior living apartment, where they lived together until her mother's death in 1979.

During the 1979/1980 academic year, Parks visited the Black Panther school in Oakland, California. As part of her visit, she attended a student play dramatizing her refusal to move in 1955, staying after to answer the students' questions. According to the school's director, Ericka Huggins, Parks "loved" the visit, praising the school's instructors and the Black Panther Party for their work. Huggins later said of Parks's visit:

I consider Rosa Parks a radical woman, a revolutionary woman, showing up in real time at an elementary school run by the Black Panther Party.

=== 1980s ===
During the 1980s, Parks continued to take part in social and political causes. In 1981, she wrote to attorney Chokwe Lumumba in support of arrested activists from the Black Liberation Army, the May 19th Communist Organization, the RNA, and Weather Underground. She also participated in the Free South Africa Movement, which opposed apartheid in South Africa. Working with the movement, Parks participated in anti-apartheid demonstrations in Washington, D.C. and Berkeley, California, and in the National Conference Against Apartheid, which took place at Ebenezer Baptist Church in Atlanta, Georgia. She supported Jesse Jackson's 1984 and 1988 presidential campaigns. Speaking on his behalf at the 1988 Democratic National Convention, Parks said:

At some point we should step aside and let the younger ones take over. But we first must take care of our young people to make sure that they have the rights of first-class citizens... And when we see so little done by so many, we just will not give up.

Parks also worked extensively with radio host and NAACP activist Joe Madison during the 1980s. After a proposed ordinance that would ban non-residents from using parks in Dearborn, Michigan, which Madison believed would lead to racial discrimination, she and Madison planned a city-wide boycott. The ordinance was ultimately overturned by a Wayne County Circuit Judge, who ruled that it was racially discriminatory. Madison and Parks also unsuccessfully ran for president and vice president of the NAACP's Detroit chapter in 1985.

In 1987, Parks co-founded the Rosa and Raymond Parks Institute for Self Development with Elaine Eason Steele. The purpose of the institute is to develop youth leaders' capabilities in advancing civil rights initiatives. The institute also offers "Pathways to Freedom" bus tours, which introduce young people to important civil rights and Underground Railroad sites throughout the country. Parks also served on the Board of Advocates for Planned Parenthood. Unrelated to her activism, she donated several quilts made by members of her family to the Detroit Historical Museum.

=== 1990s ===
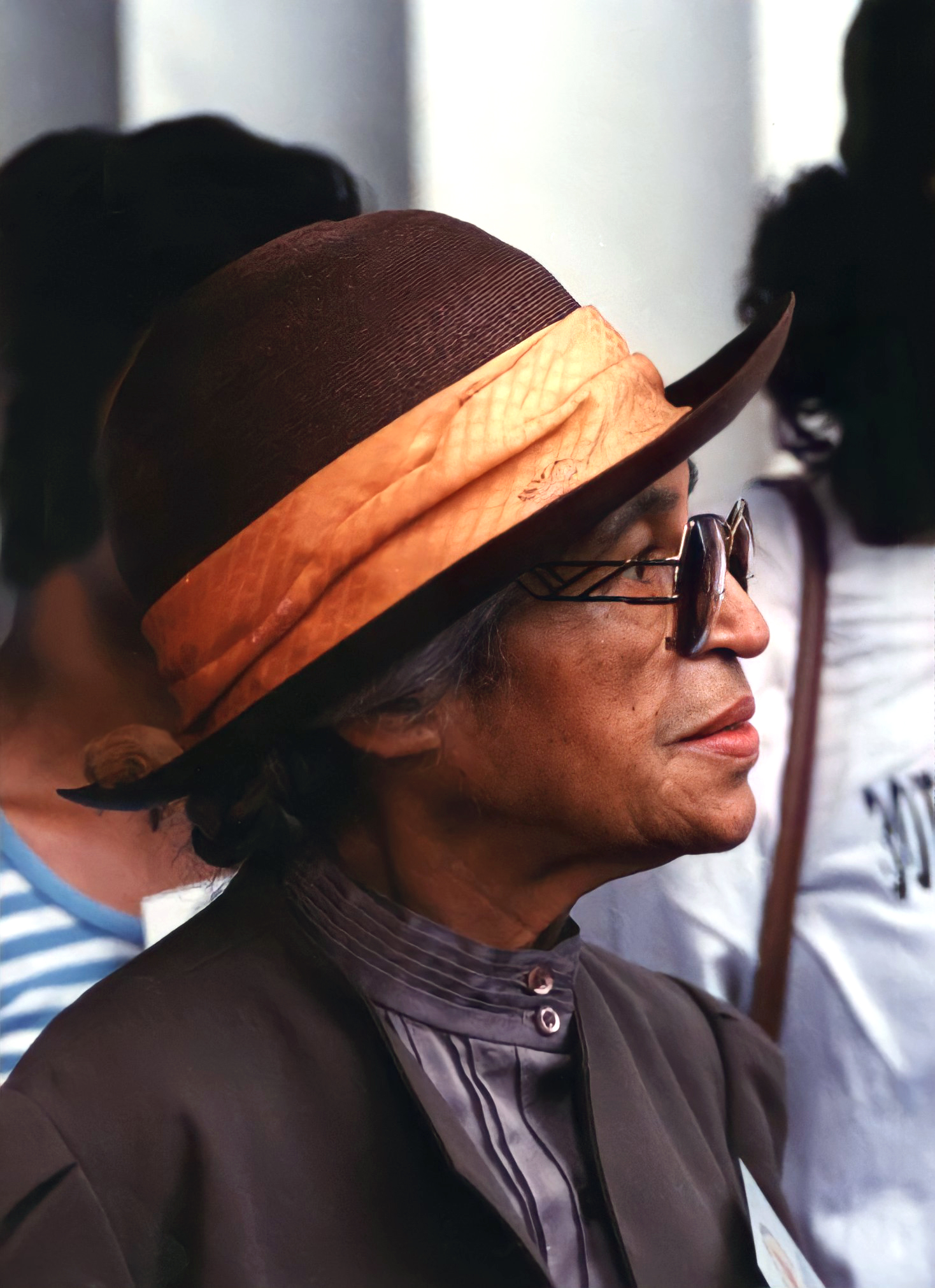
Parks photographed by John Mathew Smith at the 30th Anniversary of MLK's March on Washington, 1993

Parks continued to be politically active into the 1990s. In 1990, at a Washington, D.C., gala celebrating her birthday, Parks gave a speech calling for the release of anti-apartheid activist Nelson Mandela. She also attended the 1994 meeting of the National Coalition of Blacks for Reparations in America in Detroit alongside Jesse Jackson and Queen Mother Moore. In 1995, at the invitation of Louis Farrakhan, she participated in the Million Man March alongside Moore, Betty Shabazz, Dorothy Height, and Maya Angelou. During the 1990s, Parks authored several autobiographical works, including Rosa Parks: My Story in 1992, Quiet Strength in 1994, and Dear Mrs. Parks in 1997.

Parks was robbed and attacked in her home on August 30, 1994, at age 81. The assailant, Joseph Skipper, broke down her back door, falsely claiming to have deterred an intruder and demanding a reward of $3. After Parks complied, he demanded more money and assaulted her, punching her in the face. Eventually, Parks agreed to give Skipper all of the money she had: $103. Parks then called Steele, co-founder of the Rosa and Raymond Parks Institute, who called the police. According to United States Representative Edward Vaughn, after reports of Skipper's conduct circulated, vigilantes searched for and attacked him. Skipper was arrested on August 31. Many commentators saw Parks's assault as evidence of the moral decline of Black youth, but Parks cautioned against "read[ing] too much into the attack" and expressed compassion for Skipper, acknowledging "the conditions that made him this way".

After the assault, Parks moved from downtown Detroit to a gated community. Learning of Parks's move, Little Caesars owner Mike Ilitch offered to pay for her housing expenses indefinitely. According to judge Damon Keith, funds from Ilitch were regularly deposited into a trust on Parks's behalf.

=== 2000s ===
After the September 11 attacks in 2001, Parks joined actor Danny Glover and activists Harry Belafonte and Gloria Steinem in signing an open letter that cautioned against a "military response" and advocated for international collaboration. Later, in 2002, Parks received an eviction notice from her $1,800 per month (equivalent to $3,200 in 2025) apartment for non-payment of rent. Parks was incapable of managing her own financial affairs by this time due to age-related physical and mental decline. Her rent was paid from a collection taken by Hartford Memorial Baptist Church in Detroit.

When her rent became delinquent and her impending eviction was publicized in 2004, her landlord announced they had forgiven the back rent and would allow Parks, by then 91 and in extremely poor health, to live rent-free in the building for the remainder of her life. Steele, co-founder of the Rosa and Raymond Parks Institute, defended Parks's care and stated that the eviction notices were sent in error. Several of Parks's family members alleged that her financial affairs had been mismanaged.

== Death and funeral ==
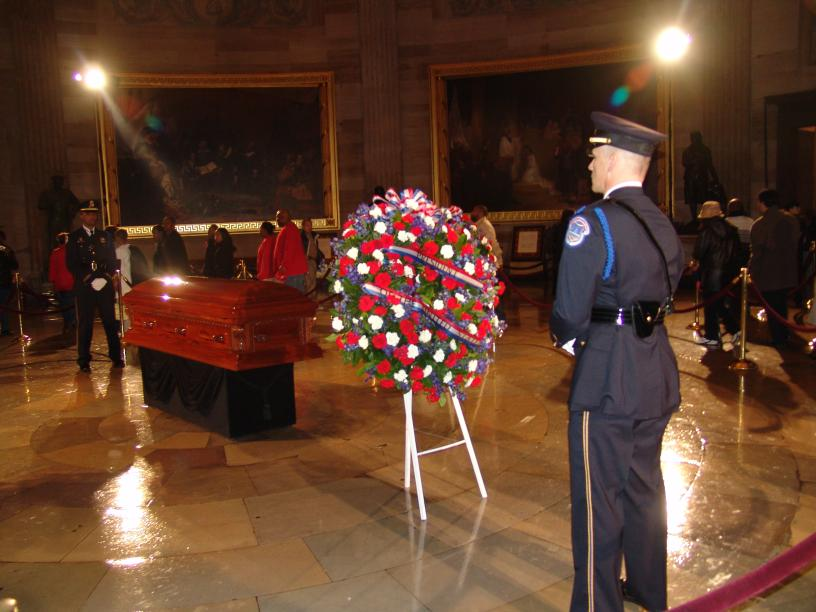
The casket of Rosa Parks at the U.S. Capitol rotunda

Parks died of natural causes in her home on October 24, 2005, at the age of 92. City officials in Detroit and Montgomery announced that the front seats of their city buses would be reserved with black ribbons and fabric in honor of Parks until her funeral, with Detroit Mayor Kwame Kilpatrick placing down a ribbon on October 27. Her remains were flown to Montgomery for a public viewing and funeral service. Among the attendees was United States secretary of state Condoleezza Rice, who remarked that "without Mrs. Parks, I probably would not be standing here today as Secretary of State". Her remains were then flown to Washington, D.C., the plane circling twice over Montgomery while the pilot sang "We Shall Overcome".

Representative Conyers introduced Concurrent Resolution 61, which received approval on October 29, 2005, allowing Parks's remains to lie in state at the United States Capitol rotunda from October 30 to 31. Her remains were transported to the rotunda by the United States National Guard. 40,000 mourners came to pay their respects. President George W. Bush and First Lady Barbara Bush laid a wreath on her coffin. Parks was the 31st individual, and the second (Note: French urban planner Pierre L'Enfant was the first.) private citizen, to be laid in state. A public memorial was also held at the Metropolitan AME Church before her remains were returned to Detroit.

In Detroit, Parks's casket was displayed at the Charles H. Wright Museum of African American History. A memorial service was held at the Greater Grace Temple on November 2. Attendees included former president and first lady Bill and Hillary Clinton and US senator Barack Obama. An honor guard accompanied Parks's casket via horse-drawn carriage to the service, where soul singer Aretha Franklin performed. After the service, a white hearse conveyed Parks's remains to Woodlawn Cemetery, where she was interred in a mausoleum alongside Raymond and her mother. The chapel was renamed the Rosa L. Parks Freedom Chapel in her honor.

== Legacy and honors ==
=== Awards ===
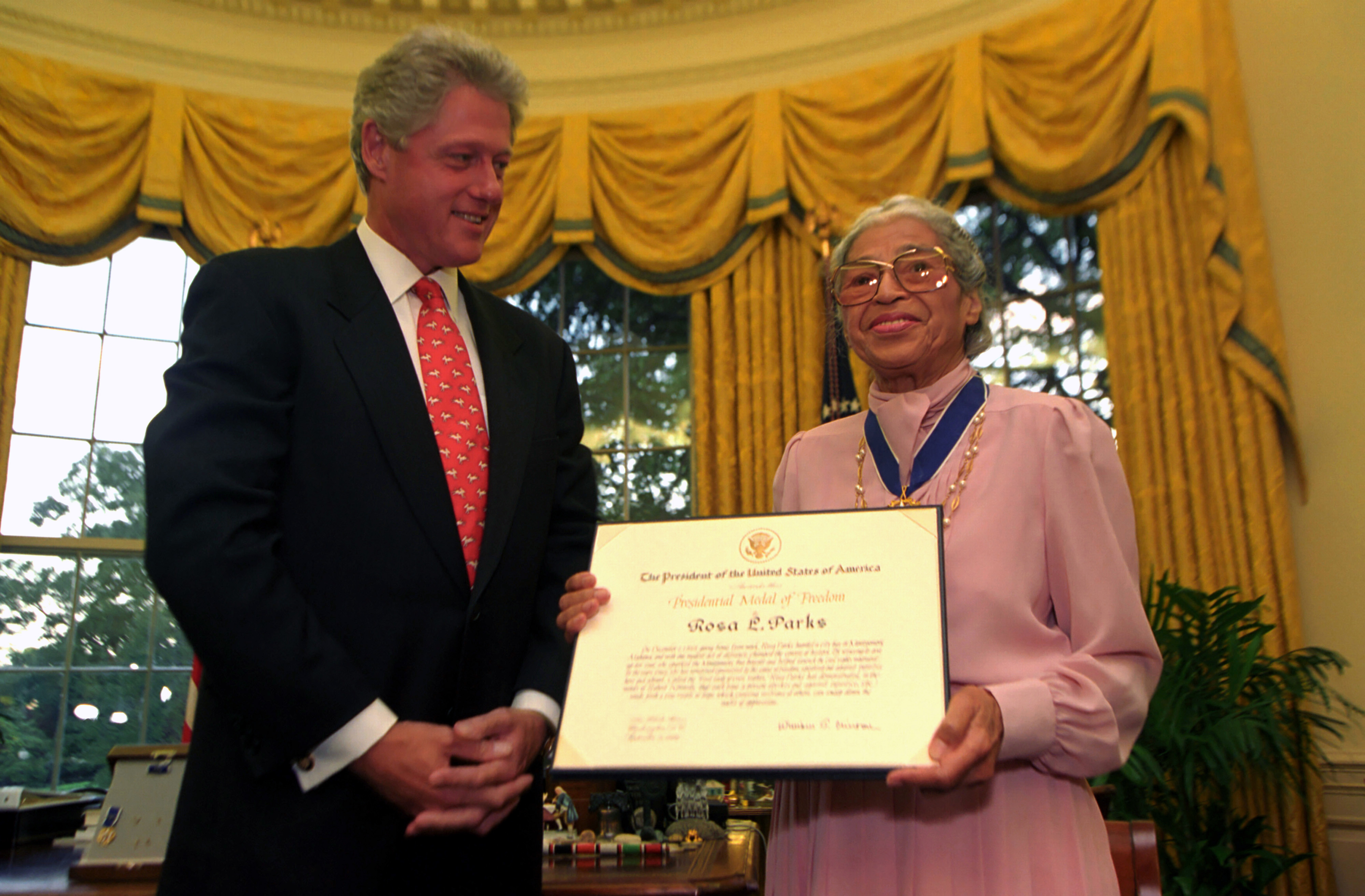
President Bill Clinton presented Rosa Parks with the Presidential Medal of Freedom in 1996.

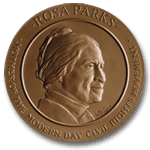
The Rosa Parks Congressional Gold Medal

Parks received several awards as a result of her contributions to the civil rights movement. The SCLC established the Rosa Parks Freedom Award in 1963, though Parks herself did not receive it until 1972. In 1965, she received the "Dignity Overdue" award from the Afro-American Broadcasting Company and was honored at a ceremony held at the Ford Auditorium in Detroit. The Capitol Press Club presented her with the Martin Luther King Jr. Award in 1968.

In 1979, the NAACP awarded her the Spingarn Medal, citing her "quiet courage and determination" in refusing to relinquish her seat. The NAACP further recognized her with their own Martin Luther King Jr. Award in 1980. In 1983, she was inducted into the Michigan Women's Hall of Fame. In 1984, she received the Candace Award from the National Coalition of 100 Black Women.

In 1992, Parks received the Peace Abbey Courage of Conscience Award. She was inducted into the National Women's Hall of Fame in 1993. In 1996, she received the Presidential Medal of Freedom, the highest award a civilian can receive from the United States executive branch, from Bill Clinton. In 1999, Parks was awarded the Congressional Gold Medal with unanimous Senate approval despite opposition in the House from Representative Ron Paul. Also in 1999, she was honored with the Windsor–Detroit International Freedom Festival Freedom Award, and Time named her one of the 20 most influential figures of the 20th century. In 2000, Parks received the Alabama Governor's Medal of Honor and the Alabama Academy Award. In 2003, she received the International Institute Heritage Hall of Fame Award.

=== Memorialization ===
Many locations and institutions have been named in honor of Parks. At the behest of her friend Louise Tappes, Detroit's 12th Street was renamed "Rosa Parks Boulevard" in 1976. (Note: According to Theoharis, this happened in 1969.) A bronze sculpture of Parks was displayed at the National Portrait Gallery in 1991. Michigan designated February 4 as Rosa Parks Day in 1997. In April 1998, the Los Angeles Metro Rail station at the intersection of today's A and C Lines (then the Blue and Green Lines) was renamed in Parks's honor. In 2000, at a cost of $10 million, Troy University opened the Rosa Parks Library and Museum at the site of Parks's arrest. Parks's apartment in Montgomery was placed on the National Register of Historic Places in 2002. The bus on which Parks refused to move was restored with funding from the Save America's Treasures program and placed on display at The Henry Ford museum in 2003.

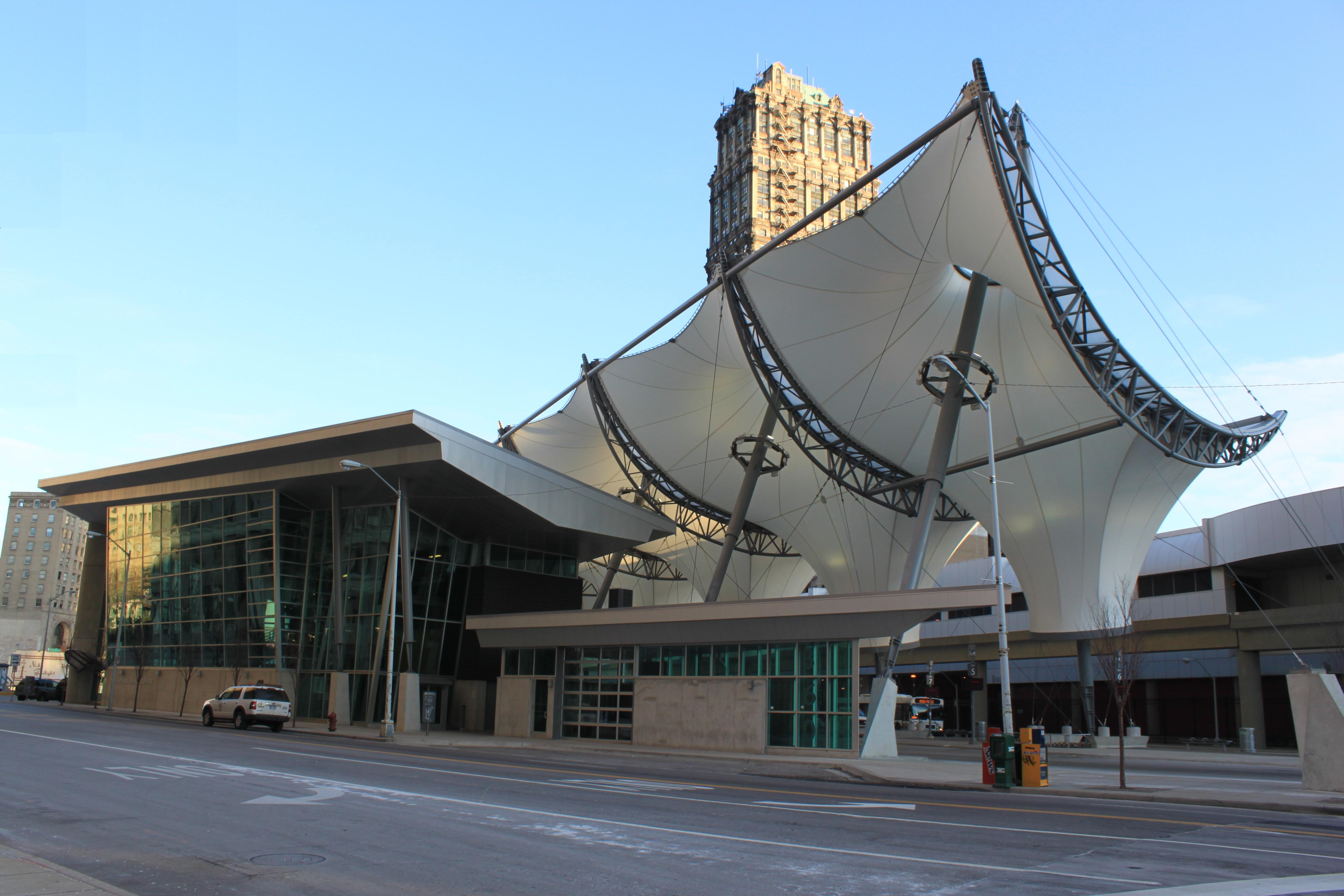
Rosa Parks Transit Center in Detroit

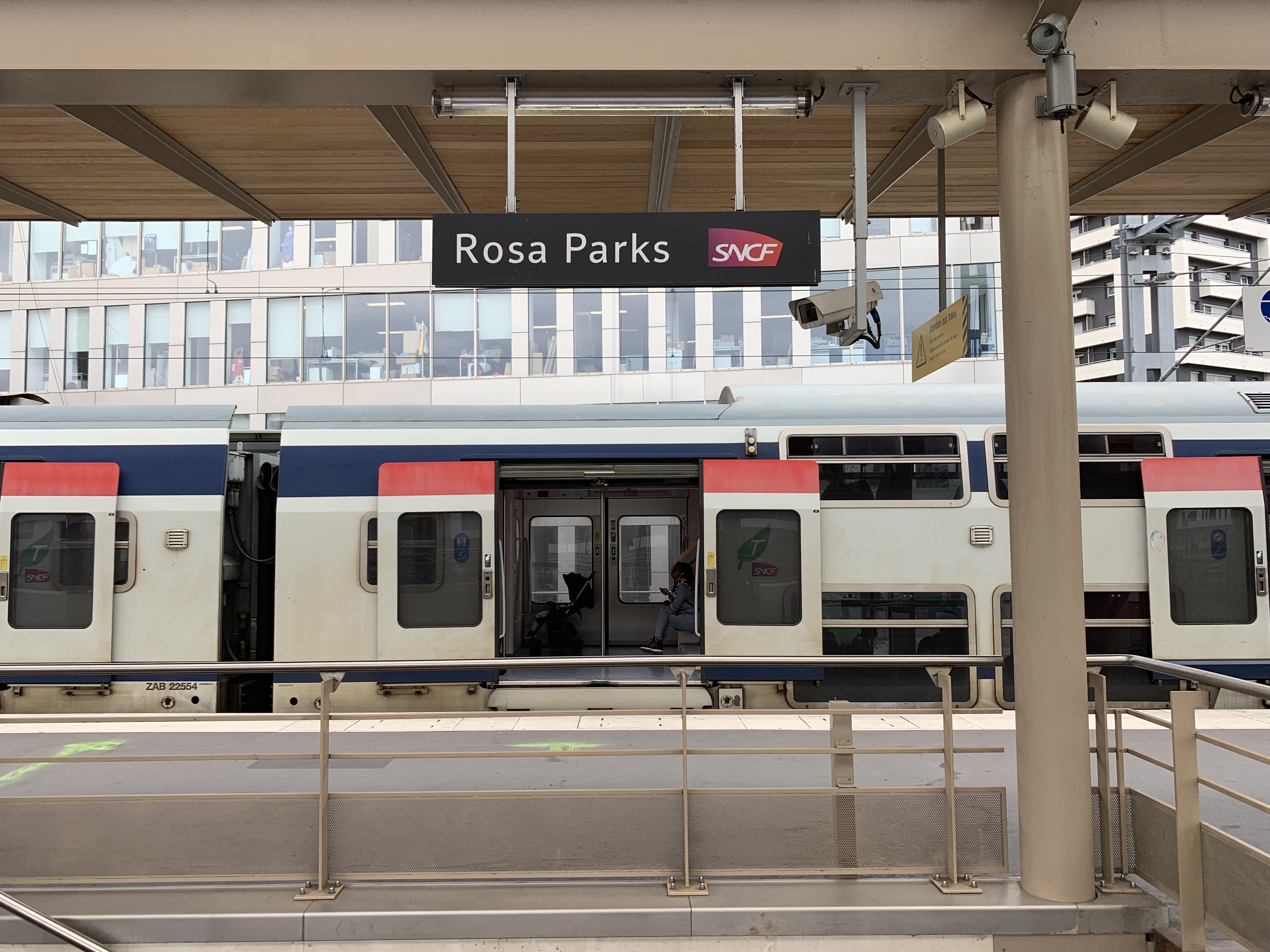
The Rosa Parks Railway Station in Paris

After Parks's death in 2005, President Bush signed H.R. 4145, which authorized a statue of Parks to be placed in the National Statuary Hall at the United States Capitol. Parks was the first Black American to receive this honor. After a competition including entries from 150 artists, a statue sculpted by Eugene Daub and Rob Firmin, which depicted Parks on the day of her arrest, was selected to be placed in the hall. The statue was unveiled in 2013, with President Obama and House Speaker John Boehner in attendance.

In 2006, Nassau County, New York County Executive Tom Suozzi announced that the Hempstead Transit Center would be renamed the Rosa Parks Hempstead Transit Center in Parks's honor. The Portland Boulevard station of the Los Angeles County MetroRail system was also officially named Rosa Parks Station in 2009. Also in 2009, the Rosa Parks Transit Center opened in downtown Detroit at the intersection of Cass and Michigan avenues. The asteroid 284996 Rosaparks, discovered in 2010 by the Wide-field Infrared Survey Explorer, was named in Parks's memory.

On February 1, 2013, Obama called "upon all Americans to observe this day with appropriate service, community, and education programs to honor Rosa Parks's enduring legacy" for the 100th anniversary of her birthday on the upcoming February 4 that year. The Henry Ford Museum designated February 4, 2013, as a "National Day of Courage". Also on February 4, the United States Postal Service unveiled a postage stamp in Parks's honor.

In 2014, a statue of Parks was dedicated at the Essex Government Complex in Newark, New Jersey. Rosa Parks station opened in Paris, France in 2015. In 2016, Parks's former residence in Detroit was threatened with demolition. A Berlin-based American artist, Ryan Mendoza, arranged to have the house disassembled, moved to his garden in Germany, and partly restored and converted into a museum honoring Parks. In 2018, the house was moved back to the United States. Brown University was initially planning to exhibit the house, but the display was cancelled. The house was eventually exhibited at the WaterFire Arts Center in Providence, Rhode Island. Also in 2018, Continuing the Conversation, a public sculpture of Parks, was unveiled on the main campus of Georgia Tech. Another statue of Parks was unveiled in Montgomery in 2019. In 2021, a bust of Rosa Parks was added to the Oval Office when Joe Biden began his presidency. A statue of Parks was approved for the Alabama State Capitol grounds in 2023.

=== Historiography ===
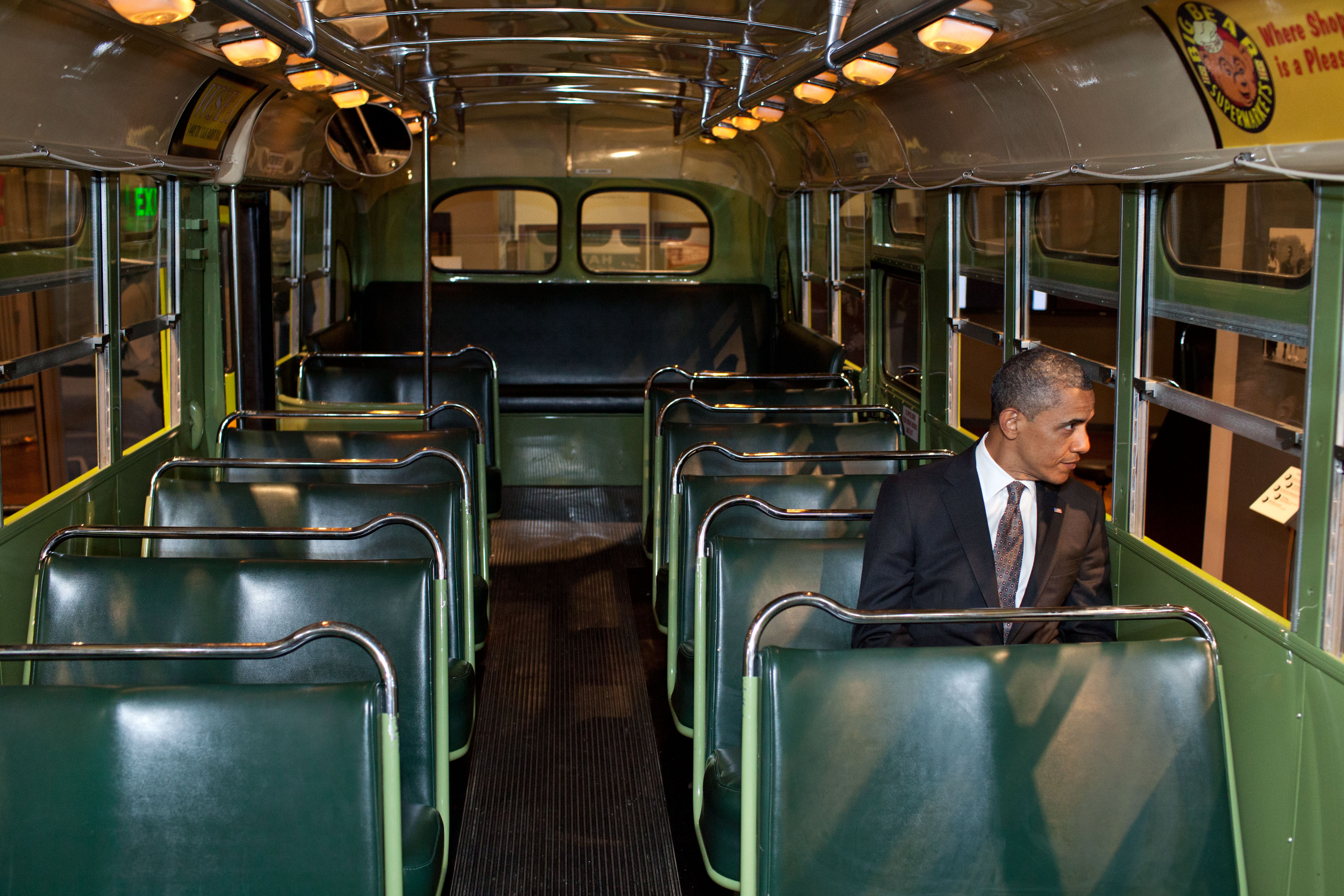
President Barack Obama sat on the Rosa Parks bus at an event in Dearborn, Michigan, in 2012, although Parks's 1955 seat was the one across from him.

Many popular narratives surrounding Parks portray her as a heroine. Senate Majority Leader Bill Frist states that Parks's refusal to move was "not an intentional attempt to change a nation, but a singular act aimed at restoring the dignity of the individual". Writing in the Florida State University Law Review, civil rights advocate A. Leon Higginbotham Jr. describes Parks as a "heroine" who exemplified "raw courage" and "genteelness". Academic Kenan İli characterizes Parks as an "icon of leadership", emphasizing her "quiet strength" and "feminine dignity". He argues that Parks's actions, driven by "values and integrity", served as a powerful catalyst for change, inspiring both Montgomery and the broader United States to confront their systemic injustices.

Jeanne Theoharis, in her 2015 biography The Rebellious Life of Mrs. Rosa Parks, argues that the popular narrative of Rosa Parks as a "quiet" and "accidental" figure in the civil rights movement obscures her lifelong radical activism and political philosophy, as well as the "variety of struggles" in which she took part. She describes the "quiet" portrayal of Parks as a "gendered caricature", contending that interviewers misinterpreted her words in an attempt to form their own narratives around Parks. Academic Riché Richardson similarly critiques the "uses, abuses, and appropriations" of Parks's legacy in contemporary political discourse, particularly the ways her image has been manipulated to serve political agendas.

Academic Dennis Carlson argues that the popular conception of Rosa Parks transforms her into a "monumentalist hero", a figure used to reinforce conservative narratives of American history and morality. According to Carlson, this portrayal isolates her act of defiance, framing it as an individual, legally-focused moment of courage that ignited but also calmed a potentially violent Black community. Biographer Darryl Mace speculates that Parks's passive and quiet public image was shaped by the gendered norms of the 1950s and the male-dominated leadership of the civil rights movement. He contends that Parks was relegated to gendered roles in the movement, and that her refusal to move was framed within a narrative of female vulnerability by civil rights organizers.

Scholars have also examined Parks's actions in relation to other, earlier instances of civil disobedience. Sociologist Barry Schwartz posits that while Parks became the celebrated symbol of the Montgomery Bus Boycott, many other individuals—including Browder, Colvin, Smith, and McDonald—played equally important and even more active roles in the struggle against segregation. Colvin herself felt a mix of emotions regarding Parks. She was glad that an adult had "stood up to the system" but also felt abandoned because the community had not supported her actions months before. (Note: Colvin initially received support from the local NAACP, but some community leaders saw her as "feisty", "uncontrollable", and not of the "right social standing". They did not pursue her case, and her later pregnancy further distanced her from the organization.) Browder's son maintained that Parks's prominence had overshadowed his mother's contributions, leaving her role largely unrecognized. Schwartz argues that accounts emphasizing the exceptional nature of Parks's refusal to move necessarily simplify the civil rights movement, creating a more accessible and symbolically compelling narrative at the cost of "forgetting" other important figures.

== In popular culture ==
=== Film and television ===
In 1999, Parks filmed a cameo appearance for the television series Touched by an Angel. She was played by Iris Little-Thomas in the 2001 film Boycott, directed by Clark Johnson, and by Angela Bassett in the 2002 biopic The Rosa Parks Story, directed by Julie Dash. She was also the subject of the short documentary film Mighty Times: The Legacy of Rosa Parks, which was nominated for Best Documentary Short Film at the 75th Academy Awards.

The 2002 film Barbershop, directed by Tim Story, garnered controversy due to its inclusion of a scene discussing Parks's actions. In the scene, Eddie, played by Cedric the Entertainer, downplays Rosa Parks's role in the civil rights movement, arguing that her actions were simply those of a tired person and that many others had performed similar acts of defiance without receiving recognition. He attributes her fame to her NAACP connections and association with King. Jesse Jackson and activist Al Sharpton criticized the movie, and Sharpton called for a boycott of the film. NAACP president Kweisi Mfume stated he thought the controversy was "overblown". Parks herself boycotted the 2003 NAACP Image Awards ceremony, which Cedric hosted.

The 2018 episode "Rosa", of the science-fiction television series Doctor Who, centers on Parks, as portrayed by Vinette Robinson. The episode was received positively, with many online commenters determining that "the writers hadn't undermined the legacy of Rosa Parks", according to commentary from the BBC. In 2022, the documentary The Rebellious Life of Mrs. Rosa Parks, the first full-length documentary about Parks, was released on Peacock. The documentary, directed by Johanna Hamilton and Yoruba Richen, was inspired by Theoharis's biography of the same name.

=== Music ===
In 1999, Parks filed a lawsuit against American hip-hop duo Outkast and their record company claiming that the duo's song "Rosa Parks", released on their 1998 album Aquemini, used her name without permission, harming her reputation. After a federal court dismissed the lawsuit, Parks filed another suit in 2004 against BMG Rights Management, Arista Records, and LaFace Records. In 2005, a settlement was reached wherein Outkast and BMG, without admitting liability, agreed to pursue projects that would "enlighten today's youth about the significant role Rosa Parks played in making America a better place for all races". The roles of Steele, co-founder of the Rosa and Raymond Parks Institute, and Gregory Reed, Parks's attorney, in these legal proceedings were subject to scrutiny, with some accusing them of "exploiting" Parks for their own gain.

Rapper Nicki Minaj received backlash online for incorporating Parks into her 2020 song "Yikes", where she rapped, "All you bitches Rosa Park, uh-oh, get your ass up". Journalist Ernest Owens criticized the lyric for its inaccurate portrayal of Parks's actions:

Y'all go remind Nicki Minaj that. Quick history lesson: She never got up, she stayed seated. The lyric makes no sense.

=== Other ===
One of the cards in the Supersisters trading card set, released in 1979, featured Parks's name and picture. She is card no. 27 in the set. In 2019, Mattel released a Barbie doll in Parks's likeness as part of their "Inspiring Women" series.

On January 4, 2016, the United States Court of Appeals for the Eleventh Circuit reviewed a lawsuit brought by the Rosa and Raymond Parks Institute for Self Development against American retail corporation Target. In the lawsuit, the institute alleged that Target infringed on Parks's rights to her name and likeness by selling merchandise using her name, contrary to a Michigan law safeguarding against the unauthorized use of a person's identity for commercial gain. The court's ruling, given by Judge Robin S. Rosenbaum, stated that "the use of Rosa Parks's name and likeness in the books, movie, and plaque are necessary to chronicling and discussing the history of the Civil Rights Movement—matters quintessentially embraced and protected by Michigan's qualified privilege", allowing the sale of the items at Target.

== See also ==
- Charlotte L. Brown – American educator and civil rights activist
- Cleveland Court Apartments 620–638
- Claudette Colvin – African-American civil rights activist (1939–2026)
- Sarah Mae Flemming – American activist
- Elizabeth Jennings Graham – African-American activist (1827–1901)
- List of civil rights leaders
- John Mitchell Jr. – American journalist (1863–1929)
- Irene Morgan – African-American anti-segregation activist
- Rosa Parks Act – 2006 Alabama law
- Timeline of the civil rights movement

== Sources ==
- Beito, David T.; Beito, Linda Royster (2009). Black Maverick: T. R. M. Howard's Fight for Civil Rights and Economic Power. Urbana: University of Illinois Press. ISBN 978-0-252-03420-6.
- Brinkley, Douglas G. (2000). Rosa Parks: A Penguin Life. New York: Penguin. ISBN 0-670-89160-6.
- Carlson, Dennis (February 2003). "Troubling Heroes: Of Rosa Parks, Multicultural Education, and Critical Pedagogy". Cultural Studies ↔ Critical Methodologies. 3 (1): 44–61. doi:10.1177/1532708603239267. Archived from the original on March 23, 2025.
- Garrow, David J. (1986). Bearing the Cross: Martin Luther King, Jr., and the Southern Christian Leadership Conference. New York: Vintage. ISBN 0-688-04794-7.
- Glennon, Robert Jerome (Spring 1991). "The Role of Law in the Civil Rights Movement: The Montgomery Bus Boycott, 1955-1957". Law and History Review. 9 (1): 59–112. doi:10.2307/743660. JSTOR 743660. Archived from the original on August 18, 2025.
- Hanson, Joyce A. (2011). Rosa Parks: A Biography. Santa Barbara: Greenwood. ISBN 978-0-313-35218-8.
- Higginbotham Jr., A. Leon (1995). "Rosa Parks: Foremother & (and) Heroine Teaching Civility & Offering a Vision for a Better Tomorrow". Florida State University Law Review. 22: 899–911. Archived from the original on August 5, 2025.
- İli, Kenan (2016). "Rosa Louise Parks as a Quiet Leader Who Transforms American Society Forever". In Erçetin, Şefika Şule (ed.). Women Leaders in Chaotic Environments: Examinations of Leadership Using Complexity Theory. Lecture Notes in Social Networks. Cham: Springer. pp. 87–98. doi:10.1007/978-3-319-44758-2_8. ISBN 978-3-319-44756-8. Archived from the original on March 23, 2025.
- Jackson, Troy (2008). Becoming King: Martin Luther King Jr. and the Making of a National Leader. Lexington: University Press of Kentucky. ISBN 978-0-8131-2520-6.
- Mace, Darryl (2021). Rosa Parks: A Life in American History. Santa Barbara: ABC-CLIO. ISBN 978-1-4408-6843-6.
- McGuire, Danielle L. (2010). At the Dark End of the Street: Black Women, Rape, and Resistance—A New History of the Civil Rights Movement from Rosa Parks to the Rise of Black Power. New York; Toronto: Knopf. ISBN 978-0-307-26906-5.
- McVeigh, Rory (June 1999). "Structural Incentives for Conservative Mobilization: Power Devaluation and the Rise of the Ku Klux Klan, 1915-1925". Social Forces. 77 (4): 1461–1496. doi:10.2307/3005883. JSTOR 3005883. Archived from the original on June 11, 2025.
- Meier, August; Rudwick, Elliott (March 1969). "The Boycott Movement Against Jim Crow Streetcars in the South, 1900-1906". The Journal of American History. 55 (4): 756–775. doi:10.2307/1900151. JSTOR 1900151. Archived from the original on December 14, 2024.
- Murphy, Larry G.; Melton, J. Gordon; Ward, Gary L., eds. (1993). "African Methodist Episcopal Church". Encyclopedia of African American Religions. New York; London: Garland Publishing. ISBN 0-8153-0500-1.
- Parks, Rosa; Haskins, James (1992). Rosa Parks: My Story. New York: Dial Books. ISBN 0-8037-0673-1.
- Parks, Rosa (1997). "An Interview with Rosa Parks, the Quilter". In MacDowell, Marsha L. (ed.). African American Quiltmaking in Michigan. Interviewed by Smith Barney, Deborah. Lansing: Michigan State University Press. ISBN 0-87013-410-8.
- Phibbs, Cheryl Fisher (2009). The Montgomery Bus Boycott: a History and Reference Guide. Santa Barbara: Greenwood. ISBN 978-0-313-35888-3. OCLC 318420889.
- Richardson, Riché (Spring 2013). "Framing Rosa Parks in Reel Time". Southern Quarterly. 50 (3): 54–65, 125. ProQuest 1436021489.
- Richardson, Riché (2021). Emancipation's Daughters: Reimagining Black Femininity and the National Body. Durham: Duke University Press. doi:10.2307/j.ctv1dv0w3k. ISBN 978-1-4780-9091-5. JSTOR j.ctv1dv0w3k. Archived from the original on March 18, 2025.
- Schwartz, Barry (June 1, 2009). "Collective Forgetting And The Symbolic Power Of Oneness: The Strange Apotheosis Of Rosa Parks". Social Psychology Quarterly. 72 (2): 123–142. doi:10.1177/019027250907200204.
- Sheehan-Dean, Aaron, ed. (2022). "The Violence of the Civil War in Comparative Perspective". Oxford Research Encyclopedia of American History. Oxford University Press. doi:10.1093/acrefore/9780199329175.013.236. ISBN 978-0-19-932917-5.
- Theoharis, Jeanne (2009). "'A Life of Being Rebellious': The Radicalism of Rosa Parks". In Theoharis, Jeanne; Woodard, Komozi; Gore, Dayo F. (eds.). Want to Start a Revolution?: Radical Women in the Black Freedom Struggle. New York: NYU Press. ISBN 978-0-8147-8313-9.
- Theoharis, Jeanne (2015). The Rebellious Life of Mrs. Rosa Parks. New York: Beacon Press. ISBN 978-0-8070-5048-4.
- Tyson, Timothy B. (1999). Radio Free Dixie: Robert F. Williams and the Roots of Black Power. Chapel Hill: University of North Carolina Press. ISBN 0-8078-2502-6.
