= Manny Sistrunk =

American football player (born 1947)

No. 64, 79
- Positions: Defensive tackle, defensive end

Personal information
- Born: June 16, 1947 (age 79); Montgomery, Alabama, U.S.
- Listed height: 6 ft 5 in (1.96 m)
- Listed weight: 269 lb (122 kg)

Career information
- High school: Booker T. Washington (Montgomery)
- College: Arkansas-Pine Bluff
- NFL draft: 1970: 5th round, 114th overall pick

Career history
- Washington Redskins (1970–1975); Philadelphia Eagles (1976–1979)
- Stats at Pro Football Reference

Manuel Sistrunk (born June 16, 1947) is an American former professional football player who was a defensive lineman for 10 seasons in the National Football League (NFL). He played college football for the Arkansas AM&N Golden Lions (now known as Arkansas-Pine Bluff) and was selected in the fifth round of the 1970 NFL draft.

== Early life ==
Sistrunk was born on June 16, 1947, in Montgomery, Alabama. At 12-years old, he was unable to afford weights, and created his own by putting rocks in paint buckets hung on the ends of an old steel pipe. At 18-years old, he participated in the Selma to Montgomery, Alabama civil rights march in 1965. He attended Booker T. Washington High School in Montgomery, where he starred on state championship football teams under coach Buddy Davis, playing defensive end and tackle. The school closed with the advent of integration in Montgomery.

== College career ==
Sistrunk had football scholarship offers from a number HBCU schools, and accepted a scholarship to attend Arkansas AM&N (now the University of Arkansas at Pine Bluff). Sistrunk played tackle at Arkansas AM&N, reportedly weighing 287 lb. (130.2 kg) before his senior season, and 275 lb. (124.7 kg) during the season. One of Sistrunk's teammates was future NFL defensive lineman L. C. Greenwood.

He played in the Blue-Gray game.

Sistrunk was known as 'Big Sis' coming out of college.

== Professional career ==
=== Washington Redskins ===
The Washington Redskins drafted Sistrunk in the fifth round of the 1970 NFL draft, 114th overall. He had been "discovered" by Washington scout Mike Allman at the Blue-Gray game. He began the season on the taxi squad, but head coach Bill Austin believed he could be a good player because of Sistrunk's determination and enthusiasm. Sistrunk eventually joined the team and started in three games, replacing Floyd Peters in the starting lineup at defensive tackle.

Sistrunk became a full-time starter at defensive left tackle in 1971, under new head coach George Allen. He was known for both speed and strength at defensive tackle. The 24-year old Sistrunk played on a defensive line with Ron McDole (32-years old at left defensive end), Diron Talbert (27-years old at right defensive tackle) and Verlon Biggs (28 years-old at right defensive end). He was one of the younger players on a team that came to be known as the "Over the Hill Gang", because of Allen's trading for older veterans. In 1971, Washington's defense was fourth in the NFL in fewest points and fewest total yards allowed, and the team record was 9–4–1. They lost in the division playoff round to the San Francisco 49ers 24–20.

Sistrunk's best memories in Washington are of the 1972 season, although he played most of the season as a reserve. Washington defeated the Green Bay Packers and Dallas Cowboys in the NFC playoffs, before losing in the Super Bowl to the undefeated Miami Dolphins. Sistrunk only started four games, with Bill Brundige, who was considered a better pass rusher, starting 10 at left tackle. Washington's defense was third in the NFL in fewest points allowed and fourth in fewest total yards allowed.

Brundige started in the 1972 divisional round playoff win over the Packers, 16–3, where the Packers had only 78 rushing yards and 133 net passing yards. However, Sistrunk got an opportunity to start as well when Allen used a five-man defensive front including both Brundige and Sistrunk during the game; with Sistrunk playing nose guard over Packers' center Ken Bowman, who described himself as having "a long afternoon". Sistrunk received a game ball for his excellent play against the Packers. The Packers game was the personal peak of Sistrunk's career with Washington.

After having an excellent game against the Packers, Allen used Sistrunk as a starter in the NFC Championship Game against the defending Super Bowl champion Cowboys, winning 26–3. Washington held Dallas to 96 rushing yards and 73 net passing yards.

Sistrunk did not start Super Bowl VII against Miami, but played in the game and had two tackles in the 14–7 loss. Miami had only 69 passing yards, but 184 rushing yards in 37 attempts, including a 49-yard run by future Hall of Fame fullback Larry Csonka (without which the Dolphins averaged less than 3.8 yards per carry in that game). Sistrunk had figured prominently in the two playoff wins, but had a difficult game against All-Pro and future Hall of Fame guard Larry Little in the Super Bowl. Before the game, Sistrunk had called Little "'a hell of a football player'".

In 1973, Sistrunk was a swing man at tackle, with Brundige again starting the majority of Washington's games at left tackle (12), and Sistrunk starting two. In 1974, he played in only two games after suffering an ankle injury. He returned in 1975, but was again a reserve behind Brundige and Talbert, starting in only one of the 13 games in which he played. Sistrunk believed he was a better player than both Talbert and Brundige, but that Allen favored them more for reasons of personal attachment rather than quality of play. Brundige did have 13, 6.5 and 8.5 quarterback sacks from 1973 to 1975, respectively.

=== Philadelphia Eagles ===
In August 1976, Allen traded Sistrunk and draft picks to the Philadelphia Eagles for cornerback Joe Lavendar, who had been holding out of the Eagles training camp. Sistrunk flourished under Eagles coach Dick Vermeil, who admired Sistrunk's strength and dedication, and described Sistrunk's play as outstanding early in the 1976 season. Sistrunk understood that Vermeil's faith in his ability to play became critical to himself individually, and to his success with the Eagles. Vermeil said that during Sistrunk's time as an Eagle (1976-79), he helped establish the way the Eagles played defense, mentored the younger defensive lineman, and set an example of the right way to practice.

Sistrunk started 14 games at defensive tackle for the Eagles in 1976 and 13 games at defensive end in 1977. In 1976 he played tackle in a four man defensive front line. In 1977, he was moved to left defensive end in a 3–4 defense, with Carl Hairston at right end and rookie Charlie Johnson at nose tackle. He started 10 games at defensive end in 1978, again in a 3–4 defense.

He had a career high five quarterback sacks in 1976, and a career second best with four or 4½ sacks in 1977. He suffered a thigh injury in November 1978 and was replaced by rookie Dennis Harrison at left defensive end, who then won the starting job the following week. While the Eagles were a below average team in 1976 and 1977, by 1978 they were 9–7 and reached the wildcard game of the 1978-79 NFL playoffs; losing to the Atlanta Falcons 14–13.

The Eagles traded for future Hall of Fame defensive end Claude Humphrey in March 1979. Humphrey became the starting left defensive end, with both Harrison and Sistrunk serving as reserves during the 1979 season. In 1980, rookie Thomas Brown won a place as defensive end on the Eagles over Sistrunk, who was waived in training camp. Vermeil knew Sistrunk did not want to retire and made efforts to help Sistrunk find a new team. However, 1979 was Sistrunk's final year in the NFL.

In an early October 1976 game against the St. Louis Cardinals, Sistrunk, sometimes considered the strongest man in the NFL, was matched against guard Conrad Dobler, sometimes described as the dirtiest player in the NFL and who referred to himself as the NFL's meanest player. The two got into a wrestling contest after one play, which ended when Sistrunk easily lifted Dobler into the air, threw him to the ground and began punching Dobler. Sistrunk said Dobler had been hitting him in the back of the head throughout the game, and he had enough.

== Honors ==
In 1973, he was named Arkansas' Worthen Professional Athlete of the Year.

== Personal life ==
His wife Anne died in January 1971, after suffering a blood clot in her brain. He later married Gloria Williams, and they lived with their son Manny Jr. in Oxen Hill, Maryland. He is a distant cousin to former NFL player Otis Sistrunk.
