= Sistrunk =

Sistrunk is a surname. Notable people with the surname include:

- Manny Sistrunk (born 1947), American football player, distant cousin of Otis
- Otis Sistrunk (born 1946), American football player

== See also ==
- Sistrunk operation, treatment for removing a thyroglossal cyst
