= Swayne School =

Swayne School may refer to:

- Swayne School, predecessor of Talladega College
- Swayne School that served students from Owyhee, Nevada
- Swayne College, predecessor of Booker T. Washington High School in Montgomery, Alabama
