= Swayne College =

Former school in Montgomery, Alabama

Swayne College, founded as the Swayne School, was a school for African American students in Montgomery, Alabama. The school operated from 1868 to 1937. Built in 1865 and dedicated in 1869, it was named for General Wager Swayne who led the Union Army in Alabama after the American Civil War, and later oversaw the Freedmen's Bureau in the state. He helped establish schools for African Americans in Alabama.

== History ==
The school was located at 632 Union Street, near Grove Street, on a site submitted by Elijah Cook and was run by the American Missionary Association. George Stanley Pope was the school's first principal. Its first African American principal was Charles Duncan, a graduate of Fisk University. Richard Bailey writes that the school was among the first to utilize the "bush school" strategy, where educators sent the school's best students into the community to teach other African-American children. Tuition for Montgomery students was free, those from neighboring areas paid $1.

Swayne College was demolished in 1948. It was succeeded on the same site in 1949 by Booker T. Washington School, Montgomery's first high school for African Americans. The community's schools later included Booker T. Washington Magnet High School, a successor to George Washington Carver High School, and the Carver Creative and Performing Arts Center (CCPAC).

A historical marker commemorates the schools' site.

== See also ==
- Montgomery Industrial School for Girls
