= Booker T. Washington School (Montgomery, Alabama) =

School in Montgomery, Alabama, United States

Booker T. Washington School (1948–1970) was a primary school in Montgomery, Alabama, U.S. It was at 632 South Union Street, and was preceded by Swayne College which had closed in 1937. The school building was demolished in 1948 to make way for Booker T. Washington High School, Montgomery's first high school for African American students.

== History ==
The school was established as a primary school for African Americans in Montgomery after the American Civil War. In 1923 it was reported that Montgomery had a Booker T. Washington School Library. In 1944, Clarence Theodore Smiley's study "A Socio-economic Study of the Students of the Booker T. Washington High School, Montgomery, Alabama, in Relation to Achievement in Selected Educational Areas" was published. In 1955 a study by Tholas House titled "A Survey of the Difficulties Experienced by the Student-teachers in the Teaching of History at Alabama State Laboratory High School and Booker T. Washington High School, Montgomery, Ala" was published. In 1957 Irene C. Williams published A Study of the Relationship Between Retardation and Drop-outs in the Seventh, Eighth, and Ninth Grades at the Booker T. Washington High School, Montgomery, Alabama, 1953-55 at Alabama State University Press.

Jeremiah Reeves, who played drums at the school, was convicted of rape in 1952 and sentenced to death. His case inspired Claudette Colvin, a 15-year-old student who, on her way home from school on March 2, 1955, refused to give her seat in the "white" section of a bus to a white woman nine months before Rosa Parks' more widely known protest. Colvin was handcuffed, arrested, and convicted. Attorney Fred Gray then won her appeals in the Browder v. Gayle case which, in November, 1956, resulted in the United States Supreme Court decision ending legal segregation on buses in the United States. Colvin was involved in a youth NAACP organization at the school, and her most influential teacher there was Geraldine Nesbitt. Rosa Parks attended the private Montgomery Industrial School for Girls in Montgomery.

The school was closed after the 1969–1970 school year, and its students were sent to Robert E. Lee High School and Jefferson Davis High School.

The Montgomery Improvement Association sponsored an oratorical contest at the school.

== Athletics ==
The school colors were blue and gold. Yellow Jackets were the mascot and the football team played at Hornet Stadium. Carver Montgomery was one of the schools it played in 1969.

== Alumni ==
- Jeremiah Reeves, drummer in the high school band
- Claudette Colvin, civil rights activist who was arrested protesting segregated busing nine months before Rosa Parks

== See also ==
- Booker T. Washington Magnet High School
