= Viola White =

American civil rights activist

Viola White (1911–1954) was an African-American woman who lived in Montgomery, Alabama and is best known for her resistance to segregated bus laws. At 35 years old, in 1944, White was arrested for refusing to give up her seat. White's arrest occurred a decade before Rosa Parks' similar act of resistance, which is credited for starting the Montgomery Bus Boycott. White worked at Maxwell Air Force Base.

== Biography ==
=== Bus incident ===
White is best known for her 1944 act of resistance to bus segregation in Montgomery, Alabama. While riding the bus, White was ordered by the bus driver to give up her seat. When she refused, the driver threatened to physically remove her; however, she continued to refuse. The driver called the police. When police arrived, they removed her from the bus, beat her, and arrested her. She was found guilty and charged a $10 fine. With help from civil rights leader and union organizer E.D. Nixon, White submitted several appeals to her charges in the Circuit Court several times. Nixon explains, "The city of Montgomery knew they couldn't win," so they used their power to prevent the appeals from ever being placed on the court calendar.

Following White's attempts to appeal her charges, local police officers retaliated. A. A. Enger, a white police officer, kidnapped White's 16-year-old daughter, drove her to a cemetery, and raped her. During the attack, her daughter memorized the officer's license plate so she could report Enger the next day. E.D. Nixon attempted several times to get a judge to sign a warrant for Enger's arrest. Once the warrant was signed, the Police Chief tipped off Enger. Enger left town, escaping being detained, fired, or facing any charges.

=== Death and afterward ===
White died ten years after the incident. At the time of her death, White's appeal still never made it onto the court Calendar. According to E.D Nixon, how White's case was handled at the state level helped activists in Montgomery form a blueprint for future segregation cases. Notably, it influenced how Rosa Parks's case was handled after she was arrested for refusing to give up her seat on December 1, 1955. The organizers learned in order for any legal challenges against bus segregation to have an impact they would need to make it to the federal court. On the lessons learned from White's case, Nixon remarked:

"We paid Mrs. Parks [fine] in Court of Common Appeal. It cost us fifty-one dollars. I believe that's what it was. Now, not that Mrs. Parks didn't have a good case, but they were going to do us just like they done us in the Viola White case. They going to hold — wanted to wear us out, wear us out and never move that case up the Circuit Court, and they was all dumbfounded when they found out that we done, decided to go into federal court with two or three people who had been mistreated on the bus."

Additionally, while Parks was listed as a plaintiff in the initial draft, they chose to exclude her as a plaintiff in the final draft of Browder v. Gayle, the federal case, which eventually ended bus segregation in Montgomery. From White, they learned Parks' appeals could be held in the circuit court for years, which would have forced them to either wait or risk the case being dismissed at the federal level since the issue was already being heard in lower courts.

== Personal life ==
Little biographical information exists on White. In the 1940 Census she reported she was born in Alabama in 1911 and received 0 years of education.

White's spouse, whose name is unknown, died prior to 1940. White had three daughters: Dorothy Williams (born 1930), Helen Mapson (born 1932), and Addie Harris (born 1935).

== See also ==
- Elizabeth Jennings Graham
- Charlotte L. Brown
- Claudette Colvin
- Aurelia Browder
- Susie McDonald
- Mary Louise Smith (activist)
- Irene Morgan

== Bibliography ==
- "Alice's Medals and Black Women's War at Home, 1940–1950.'" A Black Women's History of the United States, by Daina Ramey Berry and Kali N. Gross, Ebook ed., Beacon Press, 2020, p. 169.
- Blackside, Inc. "Interview with E.D. Nixon (Video)." Interview with E.D. Nixon, Washington University in St. Louis Blackside, Inc., 23 Feb. 1979, repository.wustl.edu/concern/videos/v405sc21t.
- Hendrickson, Paul. "The Ladies Before Rosa." The Washington Post, WP Company, 12 Apr. 1998, www.washingtonpost.com/archive/lifestyle/1998/04/12/the-ladies-before-rosa/469bf82c-16c0-45c5-9991-812ac6a6005f/.
- Theoharis, Jeanne. More Beautiful and Terrible History. Beacon Press, 2019.
- Theoharis, Jeanne. The Rebellious Life of Mrs. Rosa Parks. Beacon Press, 2015.
- Theoharis, Jeanne. "'Let Us Look at Jim Crow for the Criminal He Is.'" Other Resistors | The Rebellious Life of Mrs. Rosa Parks, The Center for the Humanities, Graduate Center, CUNY, rosaparksbiography.org/bio/other-resistors/.
