= Johnnie Carr =

American civil rights leader (1911–2008)

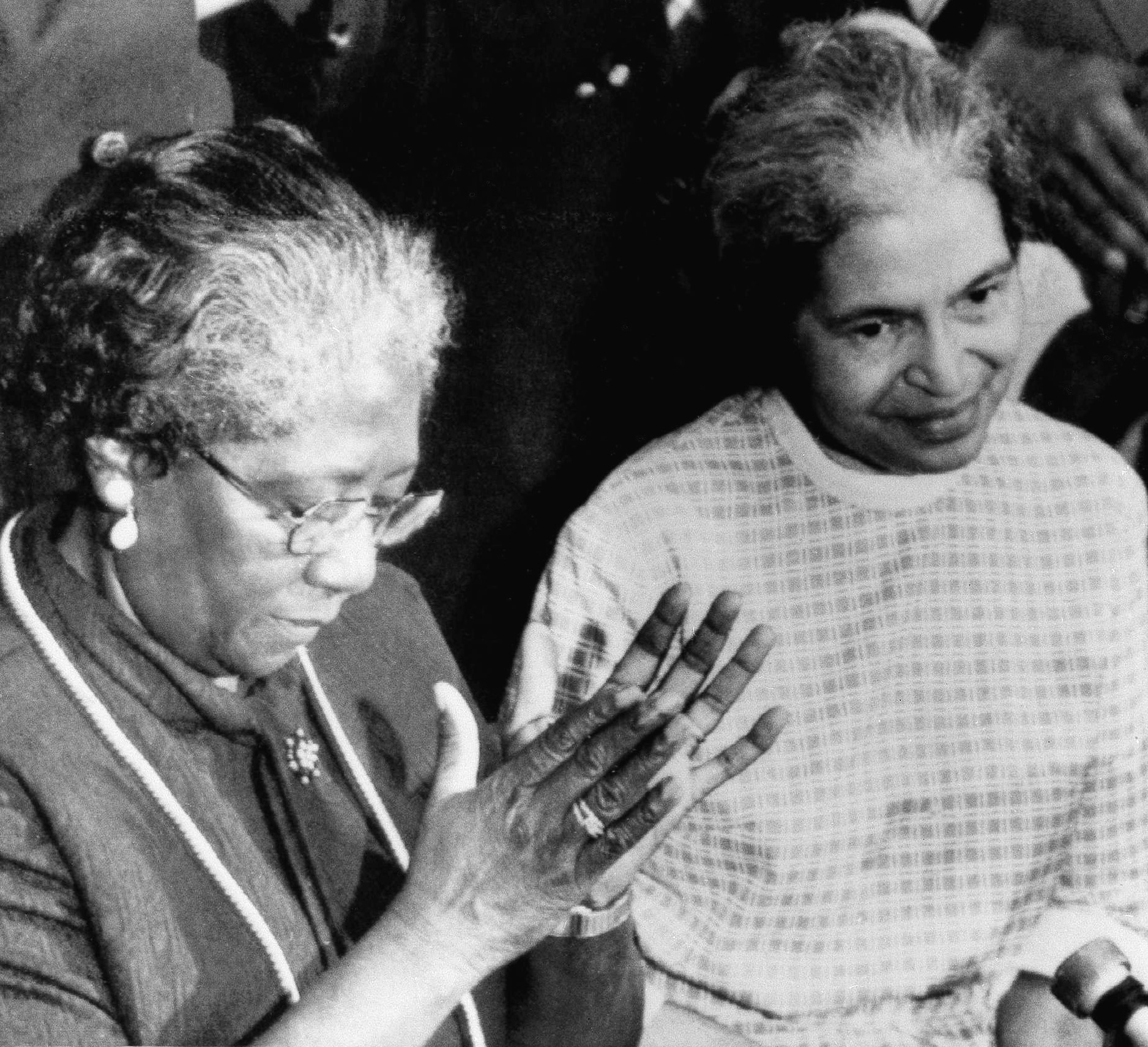
- Carr (left) and Rosa Parks in 1975
- Born: Johnnie Rebecca Daniels; January 26, 1911; Montgomery, Alabama
- Died: February 22, 2008 (aged 97)
- Occupation: Civil rights activist
- Years active: 1955–2008

Johnnie Rebecca Daniels Carr (January 26, 1911 – February 22, 2008) was a leader in the civil rights movement in the United States from 1955 until her death.

== Personal life ==
Carr was born on January 26, 1911, to parents John and Annie Richmond Daniels as the youngest of six children. When she was nine, Carr's father died; following his death, the family, now guided by a single mother, moved away from their farm to the nearby city of Montgomery, Alabama. The family sought better educational opportunities than the six-month school year in their previous rural residence, and Carr attended two private schools: the Bredding School and Alice L. White's Industrial School for Girls, also known as the Montgomery Industrial School for Girls. At the Industrial School, which Carr claims was “started by whites from the north," young Carr met and befriended young Rosa Louise McCauley, who eventually grew up to be civil rights icon Rosa Parks.

Before her graduation from high school, Carr married Jack Jordan when she was sixteen to lessen her mother's burden of being the sole caretaker of the family. The couple had two daughters. After breaking off the marriage, Carr became a practicing nurse and then an insurance agent while her mother cared for her children.

In February 1944, Carr remarried to Arlam Carr. The previous year, in 1943, the Carrs moved into their home across from Oak Park, a park separating black and white neighborhoods in Montgomery. Carr gave birth to their only child, Arlam Jr., in 1951.

== Early civil rights Career ==
Carr began her civil rights work as early as 1931, when she raised money during the Scottsboro trials for the defense of the nine wrongly accused boys.

In the late 1930s, after attending an event at Hall Baptist Church, Carr joined her local chapter of the NAACP. She began working as a youth director and secretary under E.D. Nixon, the president of the chapter at the time. In addition to working with E.D. Nixon, Carr once again met her childhood friend Rosa Parks, who she had not seen since 1927.

In 1944, Carr, along with her husband Arlam Carr, Rosa Parks, Raymond Parks, E.D. Nixon, E. G. Jackson, and Irene West, organized to defend Recy Taylor, a woman who was gang raped by six white men after attending a church service at Rock Hill Holiness Church in Abbeville, Alabama. This core of activists, who canvassed neighborhoods, raised money, and sent petitions and postcards to the governor and attorney general of Alabama, later became part of the movement that supported Martin Luther King Jr. Taylor's attackers were not indicted.

== Montgomery bus boycott ==
On December 1, 1955, Carr received a call from Nixon, who told her, "They've arrested Rosa. They got 'the wrong woman.'" This was the beginning of the Montgomery bus boycott, and Carr attended the formative mass meeting on December 5, 1955 (the same day as Rosa Parks's trial) in Holt Street Baptist Church. This mass meeting precipitated the creation of the Montgomery Improvement Association (MIA), which went on to organize the Bus Boycott throughout its existence. Carr served on committees, spoke at the Monday mass meetings of the association, and helped organize carpool systems for those who needed transportation while the boycott drew on, becoming an important and recognizable leader in the MIA. Both Carr and her husband participated in the carpool system by transporting boycott participants, even though the Montgomery law enforcement tried to stop boycott participants from using personal transportation networks on the grounds that the MIA ran mass transportation without due licensure. The MIA eventually faced a court injunction for the group's carpooling in 1956, but before the injunction took effect, the Supreme Court case that ended Montgomery's bus segregation, Gayle v. Browder, was decided in favor of the cause of the boycott participants.

== Carr v. The Montgomery Board of Education ==
In 1964, the Carrs challenged the segregation of Montgomery County schools with their thirteen-year-old son, Arlam Jr., serving as the litigant. With the help of attorney Fred Gray, the Carrs sued the Montgomery County Board of Education in the pursuit of desegregation. Arlam Jr. sought to attend Sidney Lanier High School even though it only accepted white students. Two other families originally joined the suit, but then retracted out of fear of retaliation. This fear was not unfounded as the Carrs dealt with threatening phone calls, tried to avoid possible bomb injuries by moving their beds away from the front part of their home, and prohibited neighbors from guarding their house.

On March 22, 1966, Federal judge Frank M. Johnson Jr. ruled in favors of the Carrs. The Montgomery County school system was forced to integrate with the use of a choice form that allowed students and parents to decide which Montgomery school to attend. A student or parent's choice could not be denied on any basis except if the school was overcrowded. The court also ordered for buses to be rerouted to serve each student, emphasized that all students should have full access to all services and programs, and ended segregation measures for faculty and staff in schools. Finally, the court required that the Montgomery County Board “provide remedial educational programs to eliminate the effects of past discrimination." Arlam Carr Jr. enrolled in Sidney Lanier High School with twelve other black students.

== Civil rights work after the bus boycott ==
In 1967, Carr became President of the Montgomery Improvement Association, succeeding Martin Luther King Jr. The MIA continued to work in Montgomery, with the association generating money for scholarships and establishing voter registration efforts. In addition, the MIA commemorates the Bus Boycott and celebrates the birthday of Martin Luther King Jr.

According to Morris Dees, one of three founders of Montgomery's Southern Poverty Law Center, "Johnnie Carr is one of the three major icons of the Civil Rights Movement: Dr. King, Rosa Parks and Johnnie Carr. I think ultimately, when the final history books are written, she'll be one of the few people remembered for that terrific movement."

Civil rights pioneer and U.S. Representative John Lewis, D-Ga., said, "Mrs. Carr must be looked on as one of the founders of a new America because she was there with Rosa Parks, E. D. Nixon, Martin Luther King Jr. and so many others."

Carr died of a stroke at the age of 97. She actively served as the President of the MIA until her death.

== Legacy ==
After Carr died in 2008, two months later, the Montgomery Public School Board voted to name their new middle school in her honor. The Johnnie R. Carr Middle School was completed on August 7, 2009. Superintendent of the county, John Dilworth, lauded Carr for her work encouraging active education and community membership in students. The school also runs the Carr Magnet Program, which challenges advanced students with more rigorous study.

Additionally, the Johnnie R. Carr Gymnasium in the Goode Street Community Center in Montgomery, Alabama is named in her honor.

The Town of Carrboro, North Carolina is considering changing its namesake from White Supremacist Julian Carr to Johnnie Carr, who was born the same year the town was incorporated.
