= Jeremiah Reeves =

African-American man executed in Alabama

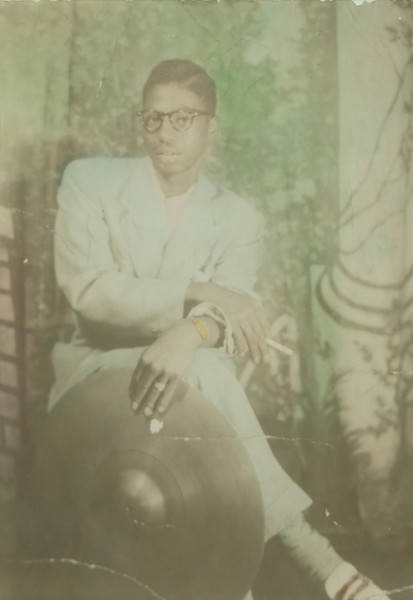
- Jeremiah Reeves in an undated picture
- Born: August 8, 1935; Montgomery, Alabama, U.S.
- Died: March 28, 1958 (aged 22); Kilby Prison, Mt. Meigs, Alabama, U.S.
- Known for: Controversial execution
- Status: Executed by electrocution
- Conviction: Rape
- Penalty: Death

Jeremiah Reeves (August 8, 1935 – March 28, 1958) was an African American jazz drummer who was executed by the state of Alabama by electrocution after being convicted of raping a white woman, Mabel Ann Crowder, in 1952. At the time of the events, Reeves was 16, working as a grocery delivery boy. He maintained his innocence at his trial. Reeves was a classmate of Claudette Colvin, who later attributed her political inclinations to the Reeves case.

There was physical evidence that Crowder had actually been raped. Reeves was also suspected in the subsequent rapes and attempted rapes of five other white women, one of whom identified him as her attacker. Crowder also identified Reeves as her attacker after he was taken into custody. Although there were credible allegations that the police had coerced Reeves into confessing, the U.S. Supreme Court rendered this a moot point when it ordered a retrial for Reeves, saying that the jury should have been allowed to learn how it was obtained. After a retrial in which the confession was not introduced, Reeves had his conviction and death sentence reinstated. He was an adult by the time he was executed in 1958.

The Reeves case provoked anger among civil rights advocates. Martin Luther King Jr. noted that the controversy stemmed not from the question of guilt or innocence, but the severity of the sentence imposed on Reeves, especially given his youth:

A young man, Jeremiah Reeves, who was little more than a child when he was first arrested, died in the electric chair for the charge of rape. Whether or not he was guilty of this crime is a question that none of us can answer. But the issue before us now is not the innocence or guilt of Jeremiah Reeves. Even if he were guilty, it is the severity and inequality of the penalty that constitutes the injustice. Full grown white men committing comparable crimes against Negro girls are rare ever punished, and are never given the death penalty or even a life sentence.

== Background ==
=== Arrest and trial ===
Jeremiah Reeves was a 16-year-old respected senior in the segregated Booker T. Washington High School, a talented jazz drummer in a band. He was also working as a grocery delivery boy in Montgomery, Alabama, when he was indicted in 1952 for the rape of a white woman. He was indicted, then quickly convicted at a two-day trial by an all-white jury that deliberated less than a half-hour; the judge imposed a death sentence.

According to the memoir by Rev. Martin Luther King Jr., he spent much time on the Reeves case. Black people were outraged by the severity the sentence in the case given the circumstances. Reeves retracted his confession, which was derived under duress. Reeves said that after his arrest, police had strapped him to an electric chair and threatened to electrocute him unless he confessed to raping Mabel Ann Crowder as well as the reported rapes of white women that had occurred that summer. This alleged confession was ultimately not admitted in evidence. However, the prosecution did present testimony that Reeves, asked "Why did you do it?" by the victim, had allegedly replied, "I don't know", which they characterized as a confession.

The National Association for the Advancement of Colored People (NAACP) provided funds to pay for Reeves' defense in an effort to protect the youth.

Reeves later admitted to having previously had sex with Crowder, but said it had been consensual. Several witnesses testified against him. In addition, there was physical evidence that Mabel Crowder, who identified Reeves and accused him of beating and robbing her, had been raped. According to a witness at the scene and two doctors at the hospital, Crowder had suffered physical injuries.

A neighbor testified that the prosecutrix came to her house about 12:40 p. m. in a state of shock and hysteria; that she was badly bruised and bleeding and asked her to report the attack to the police. The testimony of two doctors who treated her that day tended to support her claim that she had been ravished. Reeves was arrested Monday November 10, 1952, at 2:10 p. m. On Wednesday morning, prosecutrix identified him at Montgomery police headquarters. On the trial a witness for the State testified that he saw defendant running along a street about two blocks from where prosecutrix lived; that he picked him up in his automobile a short time before 1 o'clock p. m. and carried him six or seven blocks.

Reeves was also suspected of five similar attacks committed over the course of 16 months. When he was arrested in November 1952, four months after Crowder was raped, he was charged with the attempted rape of another white woman, 46-year-old Frances Prescott. Prescott identified Reeves, whose boots were found near the scene, as her attacker. Reeves was arrested after going to the home of a 12-year-old black boy shortly after the alleged attack occurred and calling a taxi. When police arrived in the neighborhood, the boy reported the incident to the police. He later identified Reeves at a taxi stand.

Reeves was indicted on six counts of rape, robbery, and attempted rape, although he was only tried in the Crowder case.

In his defense, Reeves, who entered pleas of both not guilty and not guilty by reason of insanity, offered an alibi, saying he had been playing dominoes with several friends at the time of the alleged rape. One witness for the defense testified in support of the alibi.

=== Appeals ===
Reeves' legal appeal of his conviction and death sentence by an Alabama State Criminal Court reached the Federal Circuit Court. One of the grounds by the defense was that the jury excluded African Americans. His case twice reached the United States Supreme Court. The court ordered a new trial on December 6, 1954. In its ruling, the justices stated that if the confession made by Reeves was not made under coercion, the jury should have been allowed to learn how it was obtained. The confession was not admitted at the retrial. At his second trial, Reeves was again found guilty and sentenced to death. On January 13, 1958, the U.S. Supreme Court, rejected his appeal.

As King wrote in his memoir:

"The first time, the Court reversed the decision and turned it back to the state supreme court for rehearing. The second time, the United States Supreme Court agreed to hear the case but later dismissed it, thus leaving the Alabama court free to electrocute. After the failure of a final appeal to the governor to commute the sentence, the police officials kept their promise."

Claudette Colvin was a younger classmate of Reeves and among those very upset about his case while his appeals were underway. On March 2, 1955, she defied Montgomery's bus segregation rules, which required blacks to give up seats to whites in the middle of the bus once the first rows were filled. Her action took place 9 months before Rosa Parks exercised her right of refusal and became the point person on a civil rights challenge case in which blacks conducted the more than yearlong Montgomery bus boycott to protest the segregated system. Colvin was one of four women named in the case ultimately taken to the courts, which achieved the end of bus segregation on city buses.

=== Execution and aftermath ===
Reeves was an adult by the time his sentence was carried out. He was executed on March 28, 1958, at the age of 22. He made a final statement to his pastor.

"Tell my mother when I left this world I was clinging to the nail-scarred hand that was nailed to the Cross for me. I'm ready."

Protests had arisen about his sentence, and followed his execution. Days after his execution, on Easter morning leaders of the national protest, including Rev. Martin Luther King Jr., led a prayer pilgrimage to the grounds of the Alabama state capitol in Montgomery. King focused on the sentence rather than the verdict. He saw it as a great injustice for a young black man to be put to death for a rape he committed when he was just 16, whereas white men accused of rape by black women and girls were rarely punished, let alone executed.

On that occasion, King said,

"It was the severity of Jeremiah Reeves's penalty that aroused the Negro community, not the question of his guilt or innocence. But not only are we here to repent for the sin committed against Jeremiah Reeves, but we are also here to repent for the constant miscarriage of justice that we confront every day in our courts. The death of Jeremiah Reeves is only the precipitating factor for our protest, not the causal factor. The causal factor lies deep down in the dark and dreary past of our oppression. The death of Jeremiah Reeves is but one incident, yes a tragic incident, in the long and desolate night of our court injustice. Let us go away devoid of bitterness, and with the conviction that unearned suffering is redemptive. I hope that in recognizing the necessity for struggle and suffering, we will make of it a virtue. If only to save ourselves from bitterness, we need vision to see the ordeals of this generation as the opportunity to transfigure ourselves and American society. Truth may be crucified and justice buried, but one day they will rise again. We must live and face death if necessary with that hope".

== See also ==
- Capital punishment in Alabama
- List of people executed in Alabama (pre-1972)
- List of people executed in the United States in 1958
- List of people executed by electrocution
