= Elijah Cook =

American politician (c. 1835–1916)

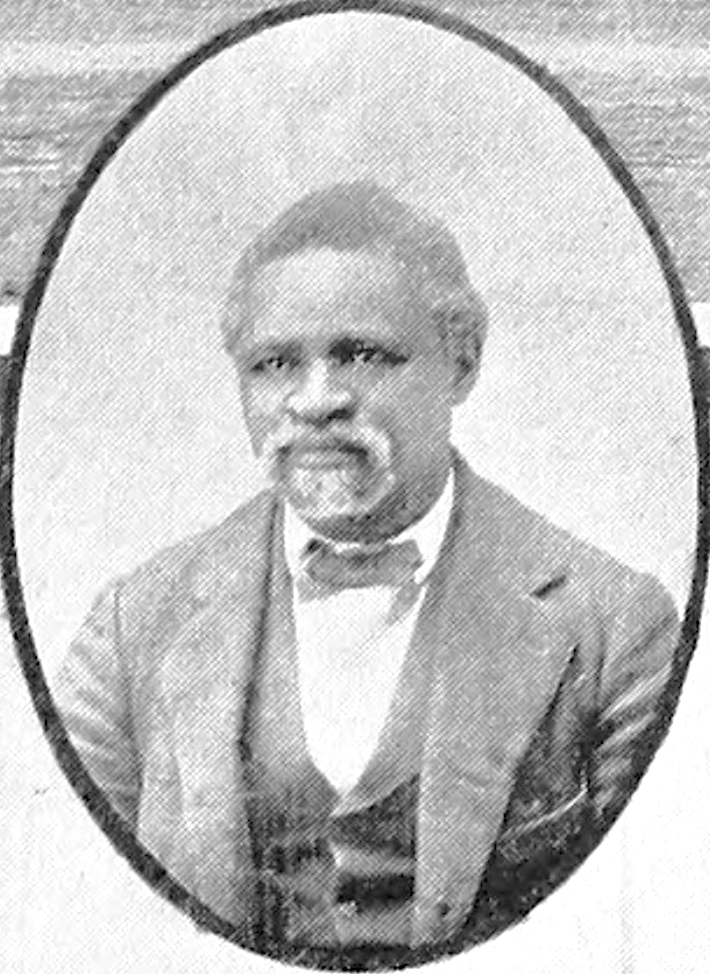
Elijah Cook, 1907

Elijah Cook (born c. 1835 –August 20, 1916) was an American community leader, organizer of schools, and legislator from Montgomery, Alabama. A former slave, he helped establish Montgomery's first school for African Americans in 1865 after the American Civil War. Chose the site for Swayne College in 1868. He also helped bring Lincoln Normal School, predecessor of Alabama State University, to Montgomery from Marion, Alabama. The New York Public Library has a photograph of his home, business, Cook, and his wife from a book published by Chicago publisher Hertel, Jenkins & Co.

Cook was born in Wetumpka. He served in Alabama's General Assembly representing Montgomery County in 1875.
