= Richard Bailey (historian) =

American historian

- Born: October 29, 1947 (age 78); Montgomery, Alabama, U.S.
- Education: Booker T. Washington Magnet High School; Alabama State University
- Occupation: Historian
- Parent(s): Raymond Bailey Sr. Lottie Parks Bailey

Richard Bailey (born October 29, 1947) is an American historian. He has written history books about Alabama during the Reconstruction era and its African American leaders. His book Neither Carpetbaggers Nor Scalawags about African American officials in Alabama during the Reconstruction era was selected by the Alabama Board of Education as a supplemental school text, only the second time a book authored by an African American has been so designated in the state. He has also helped organize efforts to erect historical markers at significant sites. He also leads black history tours.

As a native of Montgomery, Alabama, he grew up in the Centennial Hill neighborhood. He is one of Raymond Bailey Sr. and Lottie Parks Bailey's 12 children. He studied at Booker T. Washington Magnet High School and Alabama State University, graduating in 1966. Bailey retired from a 30-year civil service career in 2011. He worked as a research specialist at the Aerospace Doctrine, Research and Education Center at Maxwell Air Force Base.

He has written and spoken about Henry Allen Loveless.

== Bibliography ==
- Neither Carpetbaggers Nor Scalawags: Black Officeholders During the Reconstruction of Alabama, 1867-1878 (2010)
- They Too Call Alabama Home: African American Profiles, 1800-1999 (1999)
