= Montgomery Industrial School for Girls =

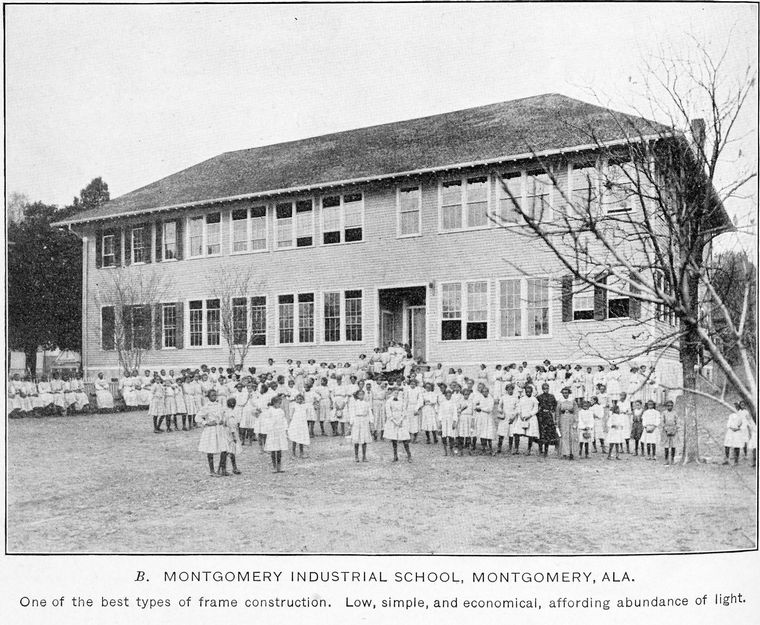
- The school in 1917
- Union Street, Montgomery, Alabama; United States

Information
- Type: Private, Primary, Same-sex, Segregated
- Religious affiliation: Christianity
- Established: 1886
- Founder: Alice White
- Closed: 1928
- Dean: Alice White
- Grades: K-8

Montgomery Industrial School for Girls (1886–1928) was a private primary school for African American girls in Montgomery, Alabama, United States. It was founded in 1886 by Alice White and H. Margaret Beard. Their goal was to instill rigorous Christian morals and a vocational education, with academic courses for black girls from kindergarten to eighth grade. According to the Encyclopedia of Alabama, "the school played an important role in shaping the lives of a number of women who would help spark the civil-rights movement in Montgomery, the state of Alabama, and the nation".

== History ==
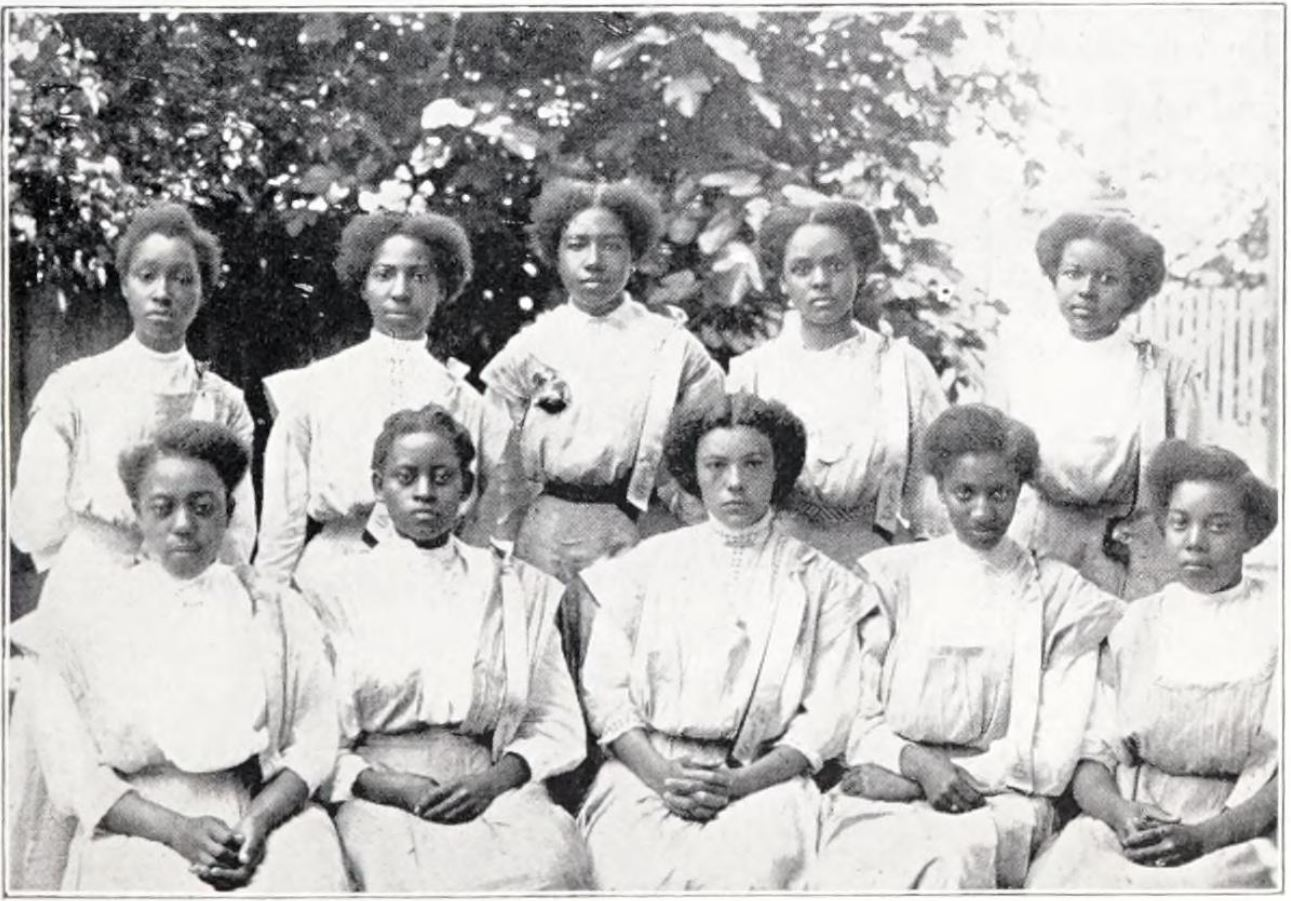
1909 Graduating class

The school was founded by Alice White and H. Margaret Beard, two white reformers from the Northeast who were associated with the reform-minded American Missionary Association, a group consisting mostly of Congregationalists which had been abolitionist before the American Civil War and afterwards supported black education in the South. They had worked in a school built on similar principles in Georgia, but it burned down in 1885, possibly as a result of arson. By 1886 they had moved to Montgomery, where White ran the school (on the location that is now 515 Union Street) and Beard was a faculty member. Their curriculum was strict: school uniforms were mandatory, jewelry and cosmetics (and hair straighteners) were discouraged. Daily devotional services also included lectures on racial equality. Classes were vocational as well as academic, and attempted to instill the kind of self-sufficiency Booker T. Washington had advocated also. It developed a good reputation among the local African-American population, though the local whites ostracized White and her staff: "White and her staff thus lived secluded lives in a dormitory beside the school but found some solace within the local black community. Despite the strict segregation laws in Montgomery, black churches took turns inviting White and her staff to their services, and parents of students invited the teachers to their homes for dinner. They also escaped the hatred and ostracism of white Montgomery when they returned to their homes in the North during summer breaks".

Rosa Parks was enrolled at the school in 1924, at first with her mother Leona paying tuition, later as a work-study pupil who cleaned two classrooms at the end of every day in exchange for attendance. Parks was already a devout child, and Johnnie Carr later remarked of her friend that the Christian education at the school made her "a straight Christian arrow".

Funding came from small tuition fees and from donations by philanthropists and foundations, and the school did well: in 1916 it had ten faculty members and enrolled 325 students. The same number, 325, was also reported in a 1917 report on "Negro Education" compiled for the US Secretary of the Interior; it noted that the school was well-managed, attendance was high, the (all-white, all-female) faculty was "efficient". There were two buildings (near the state capitol): the school building was a simple two-story structure, and a renovated antebellum home housed the faculty. The school closed in 1928 because White had become too old to run it, and no one else had her zeal or willingness to take over the school and the ostracism of the local whites.

The school had burned down twice, including once in 1923. The building that replaced it, "Ms. White's school", was incorporated into Montgomery Public Schools in 1927 (according to city documents), to become Booker T. Washington Elementary School, and was later used by Booker T. Washington Magnet High School.

== See also ==
- Swayne College
