= Dayo Gore =

American historian

Dayo Gore (Dayo F. Gore) is an African-American feminist scholar, former fellow of Harvard's Warren Center for North American History, formerly employed as assistant professor of history and of women's studies at the University of Massachusetts Amherst, Gore is currently an associate professor in the department of ethnic studies at University of California, San Diego. Gore is one of a new generation of young scholars active in preserving and exploring the infrequently chronicled history of 20th-century black women's radicalism, in the US and beyond. Along with Jeanne Theoharis and Komozi Woodard, Gore edited a collection of essays Want to Start A Revolution? Radical Women In The Black Freedom Struggle (NYU Press, 2009), to which she contributed the chapter "From Communist Politics to Black Power: The Visionary Politics and Transnational Solidarities of Victoria Ama Garvin".

Ernesto Aguilar in Political Media Review summed up the importance of Want to Start A Revolution? and similar work in forging connections between radical and progressive scholars and activism:

Whether it was the Black Arts Movement or Black Panther schools, the women profiled in Want to Start A Revolution? gave life to movements. Today, their work can teach new activists about seeing struggles not merely in mechanical ways, but in forms that see the conflicts of the world as intersecting capital, education, work, socialization and norms, and ways women have organized to confront oppression and forecast visions of liberation.

Feminist Review found the anthology also illuminating about the history of intersectionality as more than merely an academic method of analysis but as the theoretical and existential core of a radical praxis:

These women stood at the intersection of racial, sexual, and class oppression, and often devoted themselves to working on all three fronts. A chapter on Johnnie Tillmon and the welfare rights movement explores this theme of poor Black women's triple exploitation, and Esther Cooper Jackson, the subject of the first chapter, directly addressed this triad in her 1940 thesis, "The Negro Woman Domestic Worker in Relation to Trade Unionism."

Gore's book Radicalism at the Crossroads: African American Women Activists in the Cold War, was published by NYU Press in 2011. It expands the author's project to recuperate the voices and histories of radical black women in the US in the early Cold War era, and their militancy which produced the pre-history of the better-remembered civil rights and feminist/women's movements. Vicki Garvin is again highlighted alongside other unjustly forgotten women such as Thelma Dale, Beah Richards, and the communist leader Claudia Jones.
