= Booker T. Washington Magnet High School =

- BTW

Location
- 4400 Bell Road; Montgomery, Alabama 36116; United States; 32°22′09″N 86°17′58″W

Information
- Former name: Carver Creative and Performing Arts Center
- Motto: Optima in Omnia (Excellence in all Things)
- Established: 1982
- School district: Montgomery County
- Principal: Dr. Courtney Ruffin
- Faculty: 27
- Grades: High school (9–12)
- Enrollment: 505 (2023–2024)
- Colors: Blue and Gold
- Teams: Yellow Jackets
- Website: www.mps.k12.al.us/o/booker

Booker T. Washington Magnet High School (BTW) is a public magnet high school in Montgomery, Alabama.

== History ==
Carver Creative and Performing Arts Center (CCPAC) was the first magnet school in the Montgomery Public Schools (MPS) school district. CCPAC, originally located at George Washington Carver High School, was developed in 1982 to accommodate the growing need in Montgomery for specialized arts instruction for students. CCPAC began as a day program where students were bused from home schools to the Carver High School campus for magnet classes. As the program expanded and enrollment grew, the need to find a new location became more and more apparent.

In 1994, MPS received a $7,000,000 federal grant to fund several magnet schools including the Carver Creative and Performing Arts Center. A former shopping mall, Normandale Shopping Center, was selected as the future location for CCPAC, but in 1995, the shopping center was destroyed by a tornado. As a result, CCPAC began to operate out of four locations while searching for a replacement home. In 1996, CCPAC became a designated magnet school on the campus of the old Booker T. Washington School, at which time the name of the school and its program changed to Booker T. Washington Magnet High School.

== Curriculum ==
The school's arts program is divided into four "magnet" centers, each housing their own areas of study which are called magnets.

=== Creative and Performing Arts Center ===
Choral magnet

Concert and Show Band magnets

Creative Writing magnet

Photography magnet

Piano magnet

Strings magnet

Technical Theater magnet

Theater and Musical Theater magnets

Visual Art magnet

Black Arts magnet

=== Center for Advanced Technology ===
Center for Advanced Technology (CAT) magnet

=== Center for Law ===
Law magnet

=== Academy for Communication Arts ===
Broadcast Media magnet

=== Admission ===
Acceptance into BTW is based on successfully completing an audition/interview for the student's desired magnet area in addition to meeting school GPA and conduct requirements.

== Locations ==
George Washington Carver High School (1983–1996)
From its inception in 1983 to 1996, the magnet arts program was housed at George Washington Carver High School under the name Carver Creative and Performing Arts Center (CCPAC).

Simultaneous separate locations (1995–1996)
For a short time, CCPAC operated out of four locations simultaneously, including First Baptist Church (South Perry Street, Montgomery, Alabama), a Montgomery Public Schools Professional Services Building, and the former Booker T. Washington High School.

Booker T. Washington Magnet High School (1996–2018)
In 1996, a federal grant enabled the school to become its own designated magnet school (rather than a day program) housed on the campus of the old Booker T. Washington School; it was at this time that the arts magnet program adopted the name Booker T. Washington Magnet High School. This location was originally intended to be a temporary solution immediately after Normandale's unfortunate demise, but the school adapted and found over time that the building was suitable for its needs.

In August 2018, a fire destroyed some of the buildings on campus which contained areas including the school library, counselor's office, MPS child nutrition center, and the visual art, photography, broadcast media, and C.A.T. magnets.

Hayneville Road Elementary School (2018–2023)
In 2018, BTW was relocated to the site of the former Hayneville Road Elementary School until the spring of 2023 when the school moved to its new campus on Bell Road.

Booker T. Washington Magnet High School (2023–present)
Montgomery Public Schools purchased the former Holy Cross Episcopal School to be the new home of Booker T. Washington Magnet High School. An additional 100,000 square feet will be added to host the black box theater, new cafeteria, etc. The project was completed in July 2023. The students moved into the new campus on Bell Road in August 2023.

== History of Booker T. Washington High School ==
Booker T. Washington High School began in early 1865 as a primary school for African Americans. In 1916, an additional building was erected at Union and Grove Streets.

In 1937, plans were made to open a senior high school. A thirty-room unit was constructed after several of the original structures were demolished in 1948, and a 123-foot underground tunnel was developed to connect the two sides of the campus. The former auditorium-gymnasium was constructed in 1954.

In 1956, Booker T. Washington became a high school.

== Awards and recognition ==
- #3 in Montgomery, AL Metro High Schools; #28 in Alabama High Schools; #245 in Magnet High Schools in National Rankings by U.S. News & World Report
- #19 on AL.com's list of 30 best public high schools in Alabama for 2019
- #25 on Niche's list of 2020 Best Public High Schools in Alabama
- Grade A from the Alabama Department of Education Report Card
- Gold Medal, A+ College Ready Schools by U.S. News & World Report
- Your Start In The Arts High School Drama Grant Winner from the New York Conservatory For Dramatic Arts

== Notable alumni ==
- Glenn Howerton (CCPAC, c/o 1994), actor
- Chika (BTW, c/o 2015), rapper
- Robert Shimp, record engineer and producer
