= James H. Alston =

Post-Civil War American politician in Alabama

James H. Alston was an American state legislator in Alabama. He served in the legislature in 1868 and from 1869 to 1879. In 1868 he was elected from Macon County to the Alabama House of Representatives.

== Life and career ==
Alston was born into slavery in Alabama. While a slave, he learned how to read and write and trained as a shoemaker. During the American Civil War, a group of Confederate soldiers with the Tuskegee Light Infantry Company raised $1,800 (equivalent to $58,050 in 2025) to purchase him to act as their drummer. Alston was later joined by another drummer and stayed with the company until he was freed by the conclusion of the war. In 1867 he organized the Union League in Tuskegee and recruited 400 other freedmen and their supporters to join. While working there, he and other freedmen threatened with death by members of the Ku Klux Klan if they did not give up their land, resulting in many freedmen leaving the area.

Alston was elected to the Alabama House of Representatives as the representative from Macon County in 1868. Tuskegee Democratic party officials felt so threatened by his election that they offered him $3,000 (equivalent to $72,563 in 2025) to not seek reelection, an offer Alston refused.

On June 4, 1870, after a contentious meeting of the Macon County Republican Party, Alston and his wife were shot at while inside their home. While both survived, Alston was shot in both the hip and shoulder and his pregnant wife was hit in the foot. A later examination of his property determined that at least fourteen shots had been fired and that if Alston had not been lying in bed he would have been killed. Several of Alston's political opponents had made threatening statements towards him at the party meeting earlier in the day. Several of his opponents were arrested for the shooting and Alston left Tuskegee soon after. Later, testifying before an investigative committee, Alton said that he was actually shot by white members of the Macon County Democratic Party, naming Cullen A. Battle as one of the shooters.

In 1871 Alston served as a delegate to the meeting of the Colored National Labor Union's Alabama convention.

In 2011, Alston was named on a historical marker in Montgomery, Alabama along with other African American legislators who served during the Reconstruction era.

== See also ==
- African American officeholders from the end of the Civil War until before 1900
