= Transport and bus boycotts in the United States =

Boycotting of transport services in America

Transport and bus boycotts in the United States were protests against the racial segregation of transport services. These occurred before the passage of the 1964 Civil Rights Act, which outlawed such forms of discrimination.

== Frederick Douglass and James N. Buffum ==
In 1841, abolitionist Frederick Douglass and his friend James N. Buffum entered a train car reserved for white passengers in Lynn, Massachusetts. When the conductor ordered them to leave the car, they refused, after which they were forcefully removed.

== Elizabeth Jennings Graham ==
On July 16, 1854, 24-year-old schoolteacher Elizabeth Jennings Graham was forcefully expelled by a train conductor after boarding a streetcar without a “Colored Persons Allowed” sign.

== Charlotte L. Brown ==
In the mid-19th century, San Francisco's horse-drawn streetcar companies only accepted white passengers. On April 17, 1863, schoolteacher Charlotte L. Brown boarded an Omnibus Railroad Company streetcar, when she was approached by the conductor and asked to leave the car. After she objected, he forcefully removed her.

== Catharine "Kate" Brown ==
Catharine Brown boarded a train in Alexandria, Virginia, when traveling towards Washington, D.C., on February 8, 1868. She entered "what they call the 'white people's car.'" As she was boarding, a railroad policeman told her to move to a different car. He told her the car she had entered "was for ladies," and "no damned nigger was allowed to ride in that car; never was and never would be." She replied, "This car will do." Following this, the policeman and another employee grabbed Brown and began beating and kicking her. The men threw and dragged her on the boarding platform, threatening to arrest her. After a violent struggle that lasted six minutes, she asked, "What are you going to arrest me for? What have I done? Have I committed robbery? Have I murdered anybody?" Brown's injuries were so severe she was bedridden for several weeks and coughed blood.

Senators Charles Sumner and Justin Morrill called for a formal investigation, and Senator Charles Drake agreed. A resolution was passed on February 10, and the Senate committee heard testimony later that month. Brown sued the railway company for damages and was awarded $1,500 in damages in the district court. The railway company appealed, and the case eventually went before the US Supreme Court. On November 17, 1873, in an opinion delivered by Justice David Davis, the Court held that racial segregation on the railroad line was not allowed under its Congressional charter, which stated "no person shall be excluded from the cars on account of race." Davis dismissed the company's "separate but equal" argument as "an ingenious attempt to evade a compliance with the obvious meaning of the requirement" of the 1863 charter, and decided in favor of Brown.

The Court held that white and black passengers must be treated with equality in the use of the railroad's cars:

It was the discrimination in the use of the cars on account of color where slavery obtained which was the subject of discussion at the time, and not the fact that the colored race could not ride in the cars at all. Congress, in the belief that this discrimination was unjust, acted. It told this company in substance that it could extend its road within the District as desired, but that this discrimination must cease and the colored and white race, in the use of the cars, be placed on an equality. This condition it had the right to impose, and in the temper of Congress at the time, it is manifest the grant could not have been made without it.

== Civil Rights Act of 1875 ==
United States Senator Charles Sumner, with the assistance of John Mercer Langston, drafted in 1870 the bill that would become the Civil Rights Act of 1875. The bill was proposed by Senator Sumner and co-sponsored by Representative Benjamin F. Butler, both Republicans from Massachusetts, in the 41st Congress of the United States in 1870. Congress removed the coverage of public schools that Sumner had included. The act was passed by the 43rd Congress in February 1875 as a memorial to honor Sumner, who had recently died. It was signed into law by United States President Ulysses S. Grant on March 1, 1875.

== Robert and Samuel Fox ==
Robert Fox, an African American activist, sparked a civil rights battle in Louisville, Kentucky, in October 1870 by entering a segregated streetcar. Fox got in a streetcar with his brother and business partner Samuel alongside their employee, Horace Pearce. They paid their fares and sat down in the white section of the car, in violation of local laws prohibiting black men from riding inside the trolley cars (black women were permitted to ride at the back of the car, but black men were usually only allowed to ride on the platform with the driver or not at all). When John Russell, a white passenger, complained, the driver asked the men to leave. The black passengers refused. Other drivers were called to the scene, and the men were beaten and thrown off the car. In response, a crowd of African Americans gathered outside and began to throw dirt clods and rocks at the streetcar, insisting that the men be allowed to ride. The Fox brothers and Pearce returned to the streetcar and again took seats in the 'white' section, this time holding rocks in their hands to protect themselves. The three men were arrested and charged with disorderly conduct. At their trial, the defendants were unable to testify because the judge forbade blacks from testifying against whites. They were found guilty and fined $5 each ($99.48 in today's money (2021)) Shortly after, Fox filed a charge of assault and battery against the streetcar company in federal court, claiming that separate seating policies based on race were unlawful and the driver's actions were therefore improper. A jury found the company rules to be invalid and awarded damages of $15 to Fox and his fellow riders.

The company defied the jury's finding and continued racially segregated seating. As a result, Louisville black leaders organized "ride-ins" all over the city. Streetcar after streetcar was boarded by African Americans who took seats in the white section. The drivers, in response, left the cars entirely. On several occasions, black passengers drove the cars themselves, to the cheers of black spectators. Gangs of white youths swarmed into the cars, throwing black riders off them. One incident involved an African American youth named Carey Duncan. At 7 P.M. on May 12, he boarded a streetcar, walked past the driver, and sat down among the white passengers. The driver, following the company directive, did not attempt to throw him off. Instead, he stopped the car, lit a cigar, and refused to proceed until the black youth left the white area. The governor, the Louisville chief of police, and other prominent citizens looked on from the sidewalks while a large crowd gathered around the streetcar and began to shout at the youth: "Put him out!" "Hit him!" "Kick him!" "Hang him!". Some of them climbed into the car, yelling insults. Carey Duncan quietly refused to move. The crowd dragged him from his seat, pulled his inert body off the car, and began to beat him. When Duncan started to defend himself, the city police intervened.

Duncan was charged with disorderly conduct. His trial was held in Louisville city court and he was fined. The judge delivered a warning to Louisville blacks that further ride-ins would be punished. Louisville newspapers responded by blaming African Americans for the troubles and urging them to stop the ride-ins. "The assumption of their right to ride in the street cars, under the present circumstances, is injudicious, and we hope will not be persisted in," wrote an editor of the Daily Commercial. "To do so may lead to serious trouble." Finally, Mayor John G. Baxter announced he would meet with interested parties on both sides to attempt a settlement.

At the meeting, the streetcar companies finally capitulated, realizing that the federal government was likely to step in and enforce integration if they didn't agree to it themselves. To "avoid serious collisions," the company announced it would allow all passengers to choose their own seating. Afterward, mixed seating became a common practice. Newspapers around the country commented on the demonstrations and their outcome.

== Ida B. Wells ==
On May 4, 1884, a train conductor with the Chesapeake and Ohio Railway ordered Ida B. Wells to give up her seat in the first-class ladies' car and move to the smoking car, which was already crowded with other passengers. The previous year, the Supreme Court had ruled against the federal Civil Rights Act of 1875 (which had banned racial discrimination in public accommodations). This verdict supported railroad companies that chose to racially segregate their passengers. When Wells refused to give up her seat, the conductor and two men dragged her out of the car. Wells gained publicity in Memphis when she wrote a newspaper article for The Living Way, a Black church weekly, about her treatment on the train. In Memphis, she hired an African American attorney to sue the railroad. When her lawyer was bribed and paid off by the railroad company, she hired a White attorney. She won her case on December 24, 1884, when the local circuit court granted her a $500 award. The railroad company appealed to the Tennessee Supreme Court, which reversed the lower court's ruling in 1887. It concluded: "We think it is evident that the purpose of the defendant in error was to harass with a view to this suit, and that her persistence was not in good faith to obtain a comfortable seat for the short ride." Wells was ordered to pay court costs. Her reaction to the higher court's decision revealed her strong convictions on civil rights and religious faith, as she responded: "I felt so disappointed because I had hoped such great things from my suit for my people. ... O God, is there no ... justice in this land for us?"

== Plessy v. Ferguson ==
Homer Plessy On June 7, 1892, Plessy bought a first-class ticket at the Press Street Depot and boarded a "Whites Only" car of the East Louisiana Railroad in New Orleans, Louisiana, bound for Covington, Louisiana. The action violated Louisiana's Separate Car Act of 1890, that law required black passengers to be seated in separate passenger cars on Louisiana railroads from white travelers.

Plessy was charged with boarding a "whites-only" car. Plessy pleaded not guilty, contending the law was unconstitutional. He was convicted at the district level. Plessy appealed his case, but the conviction was sustained by the Louisiana Supreme Court. Plessy then appealed to the only court capable of overriding his state's decision, the U.S. Supreme Court. In May 1896, the Supreme Court issued a 7–1 decision against Plessy, ruling that the Louisiana law did not violate the Fourteenth Amendment to the U.S. Constitution and stating that although the Fourteenth Amendment established the legal equality of whites and blacks it did not and could not require the elimination of all "distinctions based upon color". The Court rejected Plessy's arguments that the Louisiana law inherently implied that black people were inferior. The court ushered in racial segregation in the United States by giving states the power to enact criminal statutes that separated black people from society. Segregation impacted the lives of millions of African Americans as they were barred from restaurants, hospitals, hotels, housing, schools, job prospects, and interpersonal relationships because of their skin color. Justice John Marshall Harlan was the only justice who contradicted the Court's decision. Harlan, now known as the "Great Dissenter", wrote, "the Constitution is color-blind, and neither knows nor tolerates classes among citizens", and so the law's distinguishing of passengers' races should have been found unconstitutional.

== Baton Rouge bus boycott ==
The Baton Rouge bus boycott was a boycott of city buses launched on June 19, 1953, by African American residents of Baton Rouge, Louisiana, who were seeking integration into the system. In the early 1950s, they made up about 80% of the ridership of the city buses and were estimated to account for slightly more than 10,000 passengers based on the $1,600 in daily revenue lost to the boycott and the fare that had recently increased to 15 cents. Under Jim Crow rules, black people were forced to sit in the back of the bus, even when the front of the bus was empty. State laws prohibited black citizens from owning private buses outside the city systems.

== Montgomery bus boycott ==
The Montgomery bus boycott was a political and social protest campaign against the policy of racial segregation on the public transit system of Montgomery, Alabama. It was a foundational event in the civil rights movement in the United States.

The campaign lasted from December 5, 1955—the Monday after Rosa Parks, an African American woman, was arrested for not giving her seat to a white person—to December 20, 1956. That day was when the federal ruling Browder v. Gayle took effect, which led to a United States Supreme Court decision that declared the Alabama and Montgomery laws that segregated buses were unconstitutional.

== Tallahassee bus boycott ==
The Tallahassee bus boycott was a citywide boycott in Tallahassee, Florida that sought to end racial segregation in the employment and seating arrangements of city buses. On May 26, 1956, Wilhelmina Jakes and Carrie Patterson, two Florida A&M University students, were arrested by the Tallahassee Police Department for "placing themselves in a position to incite a riot".

Robert Saunders, representing the NAACP, and Rev. C. K. Steele began talks with city authorities while the local African American community started boycotting the city's buses. The Inter-Civic Council ended the boycott on December 22, 1956. On January 7, 1957, the City Commission repealed the bus-franchise segregation clause because of the United States Supreme Court ruling Browder v. Gayle (1956).

== Civil Rights Act of 1964 ==
The Civil Rights Act of 1964 (Pub. L. 88–352, 78 Stat. 241, enacted July 2, 1964) outlaws discrimination based on race, color, religion, sex, national origin, and later sexual orientation and gender identity. (Note: Three Supreme Court rulings in June 2020 confirmed that employment discrimination on the basis of sexual orientation or gender identity is necessarily a form of discrimination on the basis of sex and is therefore also outlawed by the Civil Rights Act. See Bostock v. Clayton County, and also see below for more details.)

The legislation had been proposed by President John F. Kennedy in June 1963, but it was opposed by filibuster in the Senate. After Kennedy was assassinated on November 22, 1963, President Lyndon B. Johnson pushed the bill forward. The United States House of Representatives passed the bill on February 10, 1964, and after a 54-day filibuster, it passed the United States Senate on June 19, 1964. The final vote was 290–130 in the House of Representatives and 73–27 in the Senate. After the House agreed to a subsequent Senate amendment, the Civil Rights Act was signed into law by President Johnson at the White House on July 2, 1964.

The Title II of the law Outlawed discrimination based on race, color, religion, or national origin in hotels, motels, restaurants, theaters, and all other public accommodations engaged in interstate commerce; exempted private clubs without defining the term "private". Title III Prohibited state and municipal governments from denying access to public facilities on grounds of race, color, religion, or national origin. Title IV—desegregation of public education enforced the desegregation of public schools and authorized the U.S. Attorney General to file suits to enforce the act.

== See also ==
- History of civil rights in the United States
