= Kentucky International Convention Center =

Multi-use facility in Louisville, Kentucky, United States

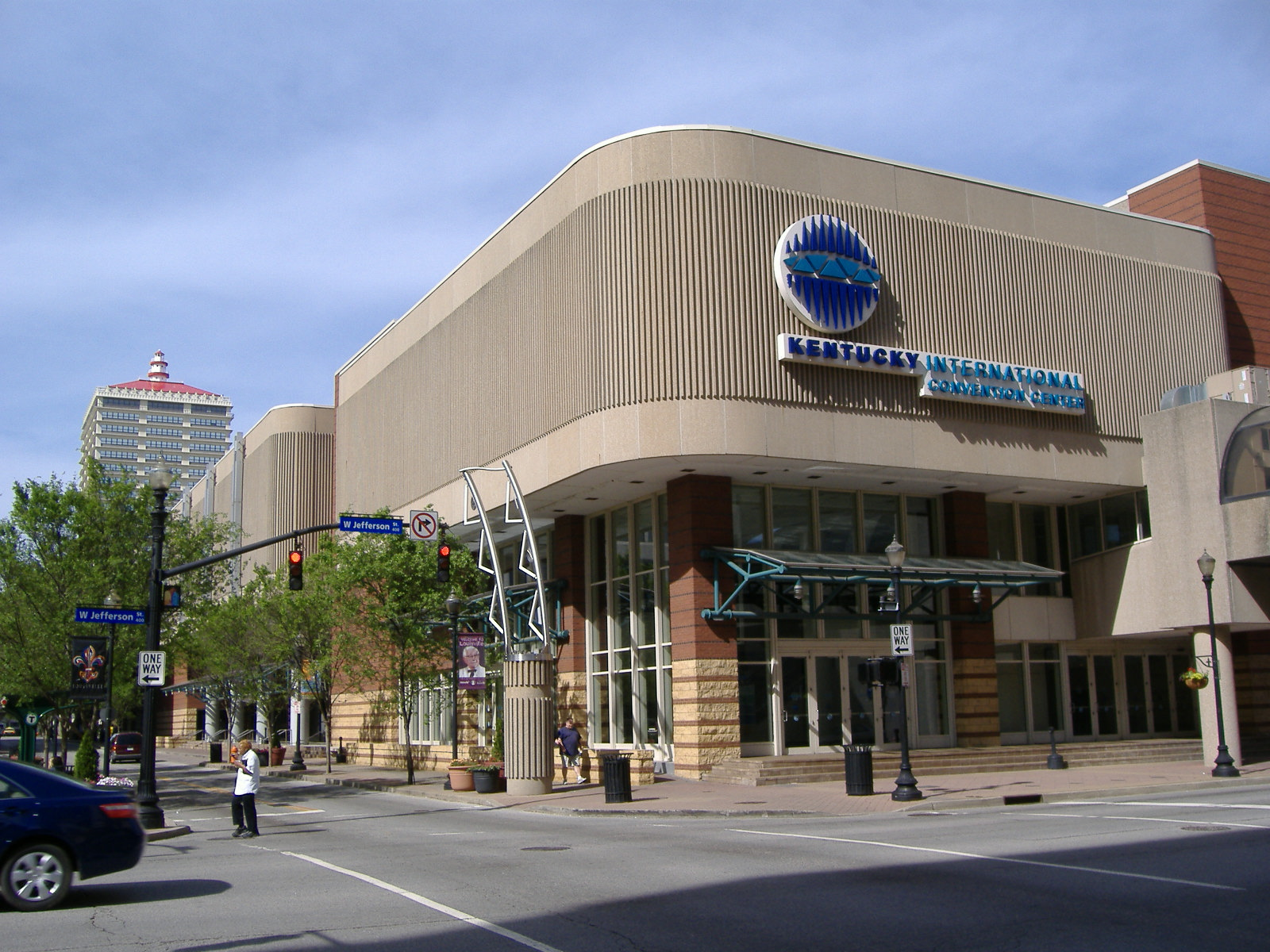
- In 2007
- Interactive map of Kentucky International Convention Center
- Former names: Commonwealth Convention Center
- Location: 221 S 4th St, Louisville, Kentucky
- Coordinates: 38°15′15.1″N 85°45′18.4″W

Construction
- Opened: 1977
- Renovated: 2016–2018

The Kentucky International Convention Center (KICC), formerly called the Commonwealth Convention Center, is a large multi-use facility in Louisville, Kentucky, United States. The KICC, along with the Kentucky Exposition Center, hosts conventions for the Louisville area. It was built on the site of the Tyler Block and opened in 1977. The facility underwent a major renovation from 2016 to 2018, seeking more space and a more inviting presence.

While the convention center does not have a permanent arena, it has hosted various sporting events, including the 2002 Ohio Valley Conference men's basketball tournament and the NCAA Division II men's basketball tournament from 1995 to 2000. It also hosted select University of Louisville women's basketball games from the 1989–90 season through 1992–93, and again in the 1994–95, 2000–01, and 2008–09 seasons. One of the exhibit halls was temporarily turned into an arena, with seats for about 7,000.

== See also ==
- Tyler Block, demolished in 1974 to build the center
- Todd Building, demolished in 1983 to make way for a new state parking garage to support the KICC
- List of attractions and events in the Louisville metropolitan area
