= George A. Myers =

American politician (1859–1930)

George A. Myers (March 5, 1859 – January 17, 1930) was an American barber, state legislator, and political organizer in Ohio. He was born in Baltimore to Isaac Myers and Emma V. née Morgan Meyers. He moved to Cleveland in 1879. He married twice and had two children. He was an advocate for civil rights and justice for African Americans.
