= Henry Wolters =

American architect

- Born: 1845; Hanover, Germany
- Died: August 29, 1921 (aged 75–76)
- Occupation: Architect

Henry Wolters (1845 – August 29, 1921) was an architect in the United States.

Wolters was born in Hanover, Germany and educated at the Technische Hochschule in Charlottenburg (now Technische Universität Berlin) and the Ecole de Beaux Arts in Paris.

In 1882, Wolters was selected as an architect for a new cotton compress company located in New Orleans.

In 1899, Wolters received severe injuries at Callahan & Sons grain elevator, resulting in his wrist being sprained and his knee-cap being fractured.

His office was one of the firms where Cincinnati architect Samuel S. Godley learned his trade.

== Work ==
- Chestnut Street Baptist Church in Louisville, Kentucky
  - Quinn Chapel (1884)
- Knight of Pythias Temple in Louisville, Kentucky
- Tyler Block in Louisville
- Old Vanderburgh County Jail in Evansville, Indiana
- Old Vanderburgh County Courthouse in Evansville, Indiana
- Jefferson County Courthouse (former) in Birmingham, Alabama with Charlie Wheelock & Son
