= Chesapeake Marine Railway and Dry Dock Company =

Historical African American-owned shipyard in Baltimore

Chesapeake Marine Railway and Dry Dock Company, founded in 1866, was the first Black-owned shipyard in Baltimore, Maryland, in the United States. It was established by Isaac Myers with investments from fifteen local Black residents including Frederick Douglass. Baltimore's Frederick Douglass-Isaac Myers Maritime Park includes the site of the shipyard.

== Establishment ==
Before the American Civil War, Baltimore's shipbuilding and maritime industries were largely interracial with both Black and white workers working together. After the war, many Irish and German workers refused to work alongside Black workers in the shipyards, who were often dismissed as a result.

Isaac Myers (1835-1891) was an African-American caulker who worked in Baltimore's shipyards and founded the Colored Caulkers Trade Union Society. The union offered stock for sale and raised $10,000 from Black Baltimore residents, including Frederick Douglass. The union attempted to lease a site for a shipyard and dry dock company, but were denied by white property owners. William Applegarth, a local white businessman, served as an intermediary and helped the union obtain a lease.

The Chesapeake Marine Railway and Dry Dock Company opened on February 12, 1866. The company was successful and worked on private and government contracts. It employed 300 Black caulkers and eventually employed white workers as well.

The shipyard closed in 1884.

== Modern day ==
Frederick Douglass-Isaac Myers Maritime Park, established in 2006, includes the site of the company.
