= Quinn Chapel AME Church =

Quinn Chapel AME Church may refer to:

- Quinn Chapel AME Church (Chicago)
- Chestnut Street Baptist Church or Quinn Chapel AME Church, a church in Louisville, Kentucky
- Quinn Chapel AME Church (St. Louis, Missouri)
