= Kate Brown (plaintiff) =

American civil rights activist (c. 1840 – 1883)

- Born: Catharine Brown c. 1840
- Died: 1883
- Other name: Kate Dodson
- Occupation: restroom attendant
- Employer: United States Senate
- Known for: Plaintiff in US Supreme Court civil rights case Railroad Company v. Brown

Catharine Brown (c. 1840 – 1883) was an employee of the United States Senate and the plaintiff in Railroad Company v. Brown (1873), a case decided by the United States Supreme Court. A white security guard violently ejected this African American woman from an illegally segregated railroad car in Alexandria, Virginia, on February 8, 1868.

== Early life and career ==
Little is known about Catharine Brown's early life. She was born into freedom in Virginia in the 1830s and grew up in Alexandria, the daughter of Sarah Ann Piper Brown, a free woman of color. She moved from Alexandria to Washington, D.C., sometime after 1853. In 1860, she was working as a live-in domestic servant in the Washington home of civil engineer Edmund French. In 1861, she moved into the house of new husband, Jacob Dodson, a US Senate restroom attendant and former aide to Thomas Hart Benton and John C. Frémont. By the end of 1861, likely at the intercession of her well-connected husband, the US Senate sergeant-at-arms hired her to take charge of the ladies' retiring room, keeping it clean and looking after its patrons. Brown earned wages of $1 a day, 30 days a month. Laundering the Senate's towels and curtains netted her an additional $20-$30 a month. At the time, landing a federal job required connections to influential white officials, and holding such jobs put Jacob and Kate Dodson firmly in the Black middle class. However, Jacob developed a severe drinking problem, lost his job, and allegedly became adulterous and abusive toward his wife. Kate divorced him in October 1867 and legally resumed her maiden name.

== Racist incident ==
During the afternoon of February 8, 1868, Brown boarded a train in Alexandria, Virginia, traveling home to Washington, D.C. She had been visiting a sick relative in Alexandria and had traveled outbound on the ladies' railroad car without incident, as the railroad did not attempt to segregate the passengers by race on trains leaving Washington. She had purchased a round-trip ticket in Washington. Both segments of her trip took place on lines managed by the Washington, Alexandria, and Georgetown Railroad Company.

On her return trip from Alexandria, Brown tried to travel on board the ladies' car again, at the rear of the train. As she was boarding, a railroad security guard ordered her to change to the forward car, which she had observed was dirty and packed with unruly men. She replied, "This car will do." He told her the car she had entered "was for ladies," and "no damned nigger was allowed to ride in that car anyhow; never was and never would be." She refused to change cars, declaring, "Before I leave this car I will suffer death."

The railroad police officer, aided by a second white man, seized Brown and, after a violent struggle that lasted six minutes, in which she was beaten and kicked, threw her on the boarding platform, dragged her along the platform, and threatened to arrest her, all while cursing at her and hurling racist invective. They left her injured and crying on the platform. Another passenger, a white Senate clerk by the name of Benjamin H. Hinds, helped her to board the forward car and stayed with her during the journey to Washington.

Brown's injuries were so serious that she was bedridden for several weeks. She received severe contusions on her torso and limbs, a sprained shoulder and elbow, a black eye, and hemorrhages in her lungs that caused her to spit up blood. A physician, Dr. Alexander Thomas Augusta, who had been a commissioned officer during the Civil War, had to be summoned to minister to her injuries.

== Legal consequences ==
Brown's brutal treatment stirred outrage, especially among the Radical Republicans who controlled Congress at the time. "A dastardly outrage was perpetrated in Alexandria on Saturday afternoon," declared one newspaper, "which is justly considered a disgrace to this age of civilization." Many US senators knew Brown personally from her service at the Capitol. Senators Charles Sumner and Justin Morrill called for an official investigation into what Morrill denounced as an "outrage upon an American woman," and Senator Charles Drake concurred. Senator Lot Morrill introduced a resolution requiring a Senate investigation; the resolution was referred on February 10. The Senate Committee on the District of Columbia, chaired by James Harlan, heard testimony later that month and issued a 26-page report favorable to Brown. The railroad security guard was terminated by his employer ahead of the Senate hearing.

Brown sued the railway company for damages. The case went to trial in March 1870 in the Supreme Court for the District of Columbia, and an all-white jury awarded Brown $1,500 in damages. The railway company appealed the verdict, and the case went before the Supreme Court of the United States. On November 17, 1873, in an opinion delivered by Justice David Davis, the Court held that racial segregation on the Washington-Alexandria railroad line was prohibited under the company's congressional charter, which stated that "no person shall be excluded from the cars on account of race." This stipulation had been incorporated into the charter at the behest of Senator Charles Sumner. Justice Davis rejected the company's "separate but equal" argument as "an ingenious attempt to evade a compliance with the obvious meaning of the requirement" of the 1863 charter and decided in favor of Brown.

The Court held that white and Black passengers must be treated equally in the use of the railroad's cars:

It was the discrimination in the use of the cars on account of color where slavery obtained which was the subject of discussion at the time, and not the fact that the colored race could not ride in the cars at all. Congress, in the belief that this discrimination was unjust, acted. It told this company in substance that it could extend its road within the District as desired, but that this discrimination must cease and the colored and white race, in the use of the cars, be placed on an equality. This condition it had the right to impose, and in the temper of Congress at the time, it is manifest the grant could not have been made without it.

== Later life and career ==
Brown recovered from her injuries and remained a Senate employee until 1880. At the behest of Senator Sumner, from 1874 to 1879 Congress included a separate line in the annual federal appropriations bill to cover her wages of $720 each year. However, in August 1880, Brown was dismissed from her job by the Democrats, who had gained control of the Senate in 1879. When she died in 1883 in Washington, her estate was worth $4,000, making her better off financially than the vast majority of African Americans at the time.

== Legacy ==
The Congressional Black Associates, which supports Congressional staff, named one of its Trailblazer Awards in Brown's honor.

== See also ==
- List of 19th-century African-American civil rights activists
