= Old Vanderburgh County Courthouse =

Historic courthouse in Indiana, US

- U.S. National Register of Historic Places
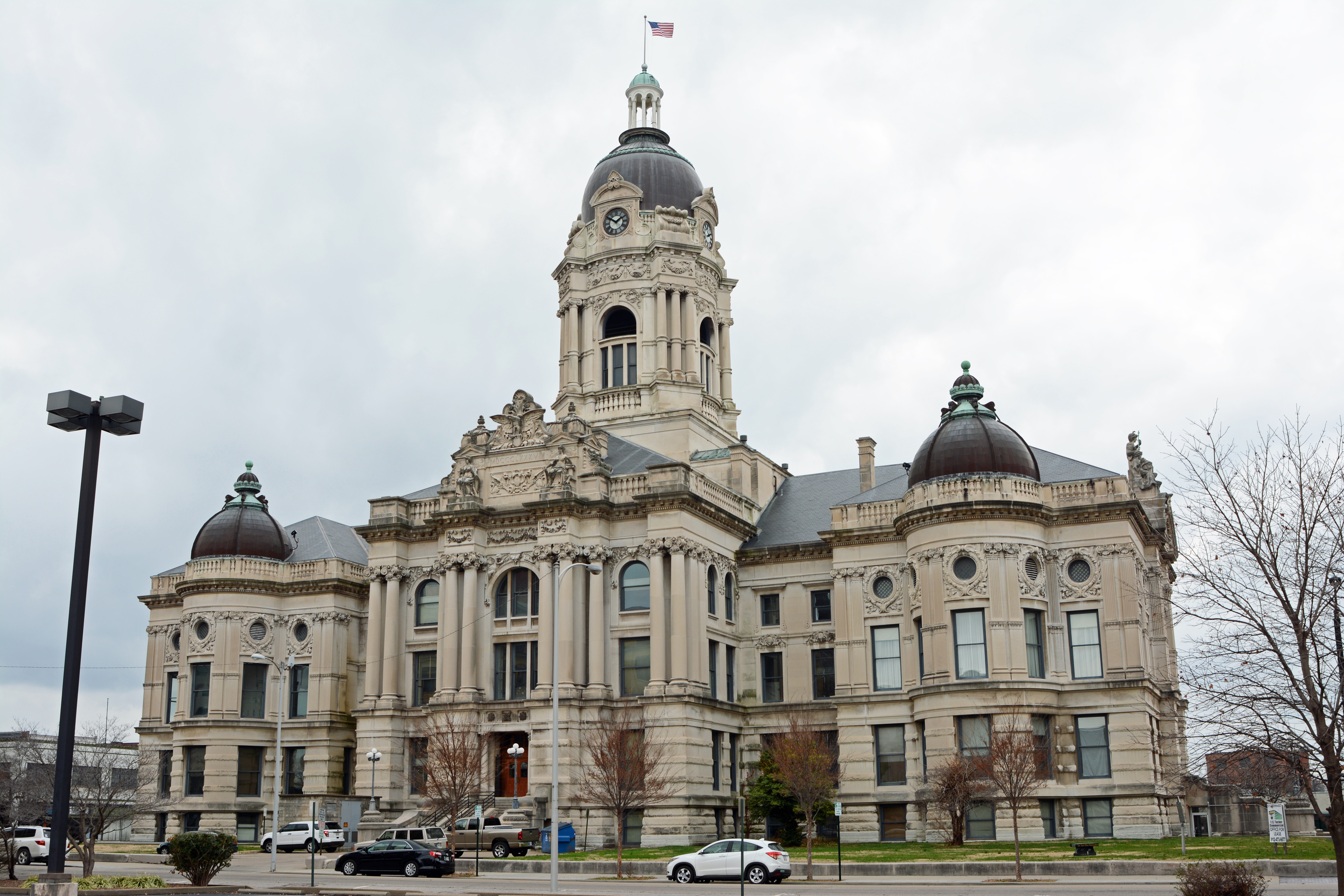

- Location within Indiana Location within the United States
- Interactive map showing the location of Old Vanderburgh County Courthouse
- Location: Evansville, Indiana
- Coordinates: 37.9739°N 87.5722°W
- Area: 2.2 acres (0.89 ha)
- Built: 1888–1890
- Architect: Henry Wolters
- Architectural style: Baroque
- NRHP reference No.: 70000010
- Added to NRHP: September 4, 1970

The Old Vanderburgh County Courthouse, often simply called the "Old Courthouse," was once the center of Vanderburgh County, Indiana government. Construction started in the spring of 1888 and was completed in November 1890. The building was ready to be occupied by the county government in early 1891. It sits in the heart of downtown Evansville.

The building was designed by architect Henry Wolters of Louisville, Kentucky and constructed by Charles Pearce & Company of Indianapolis. The 19th century German Beaux-Arts architecture masterpiece cost $379,450 to build. (Note: A $379,450 capital expense in 1890 would be roughly equivalent to $76,000,000 in 2011.) The Old Courthouse occupies an entire city block, bounded by Court, Fourth, Vine and Fifth Streets, with each side being encrusted with sculptures and stone carvings in Indiana limestone. The fourteen main statues of human figures are the work of Franz Engelsmann, who studied under the great German masters before setting up his studio in Chicago. In addition, carvings of vegetables, fruits, and flowers indigenous to the area adorn the capitals of the forty-eight pairs of pilasters around the entire building.

Before the courthouse was built, the site was a basin where canal boats on the Wabash and Erie Canal would deliver cargo and turn around for the return trip north. After the advent of the railroads and the canal's abandonment, the site was filled in and the courthouse was constructed upon it.

A tunnel runs beneath Vine Street connecting the Old Courthouse to the Old Vanderburgh County Jail.

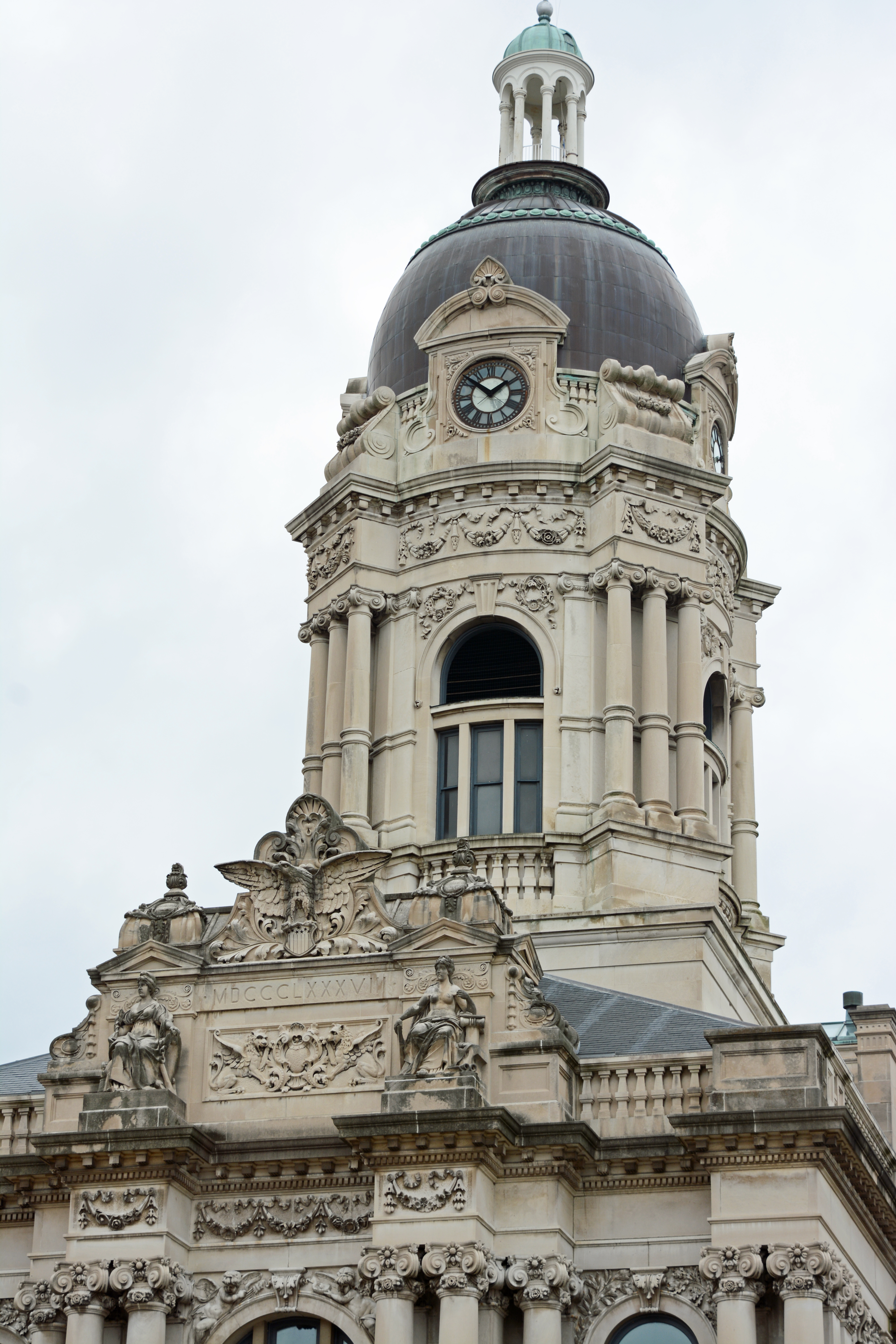
The tower

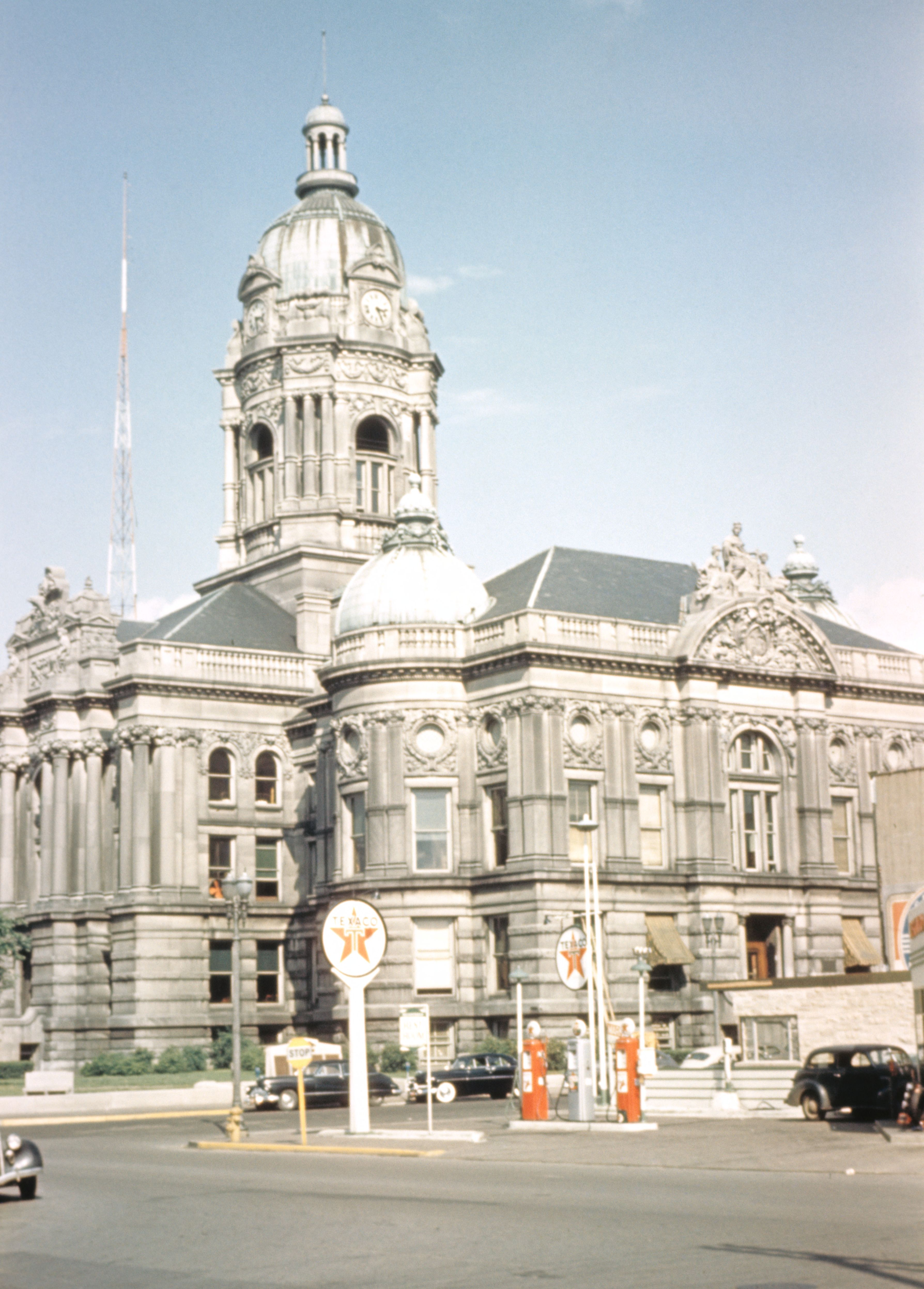

The bell tower rises above the Old Courthouse to a height of 216 feet (66 m)
