= Old Vanderburgh County Jail =

American Historic Place

- Former Vanderburgh County Sheriff's Residence
- U.S. National Register of Historic Places
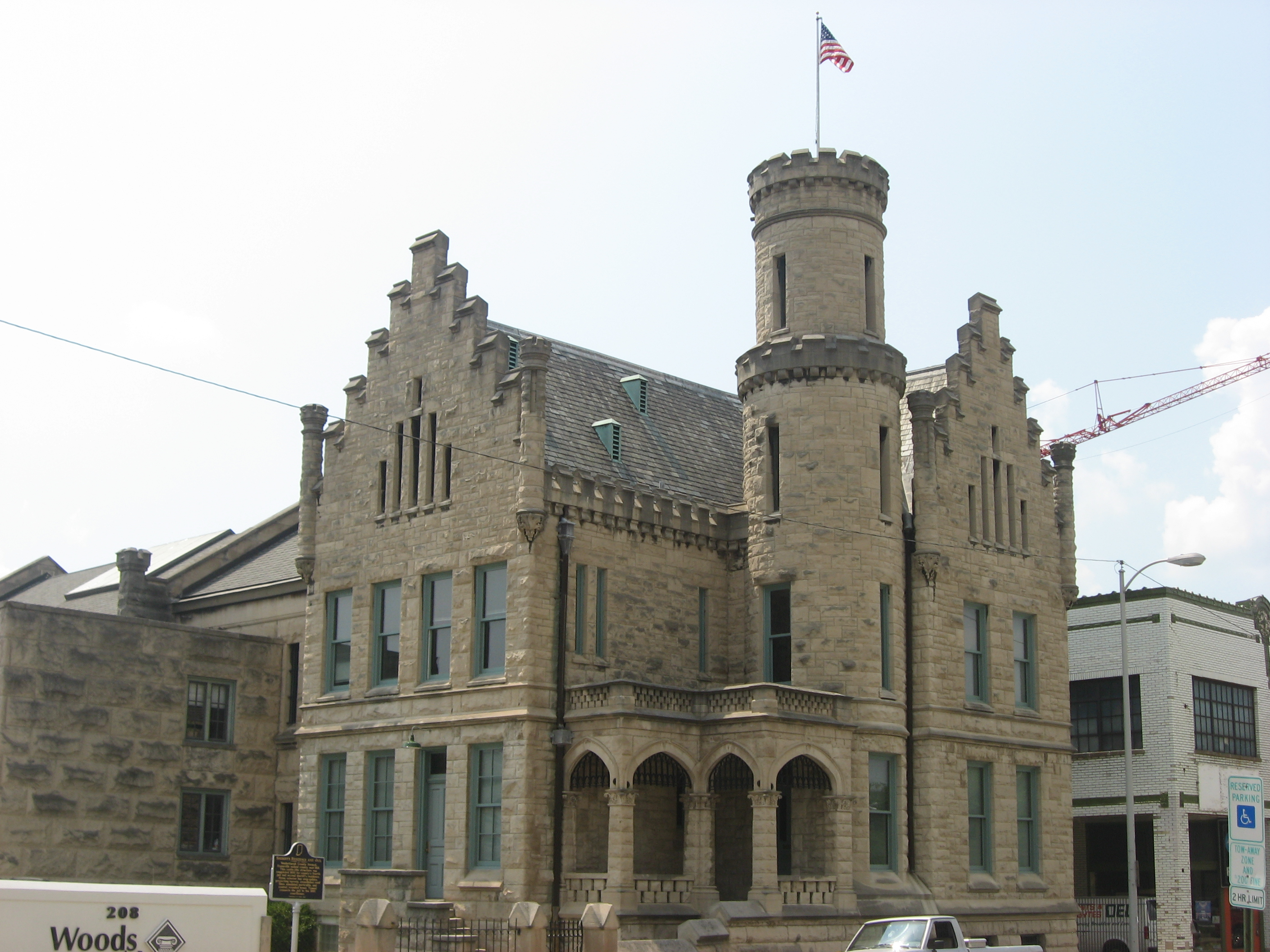
- Former Vanderburgh County Sheriff's Residence, July 2011

- Location within Indiana Location within the United States
- Location: 4th St. between Vine and Court Sts., Evansville, Indiana
- Coordinates: 37°58′23″N 87°34′23″W
- Area: 0.1 acres (0.040 ha)
- Built: 1891
- Architectural style: Bastille
- NRHP reference No.: 70000009
- Added to NRHP: October 6, 1970

The Old Vanderburgh County Jail, commonly referred to as "the Old Jail," was built in 1890 in Evansville, Indiana. The Old Jail is listed on the National Register of Historic Places. The Old Jail consists of two different structures that are attached: (1) the actual jail and (2) the former Vanderburgh County sheriff's residence.

== Architecture ==
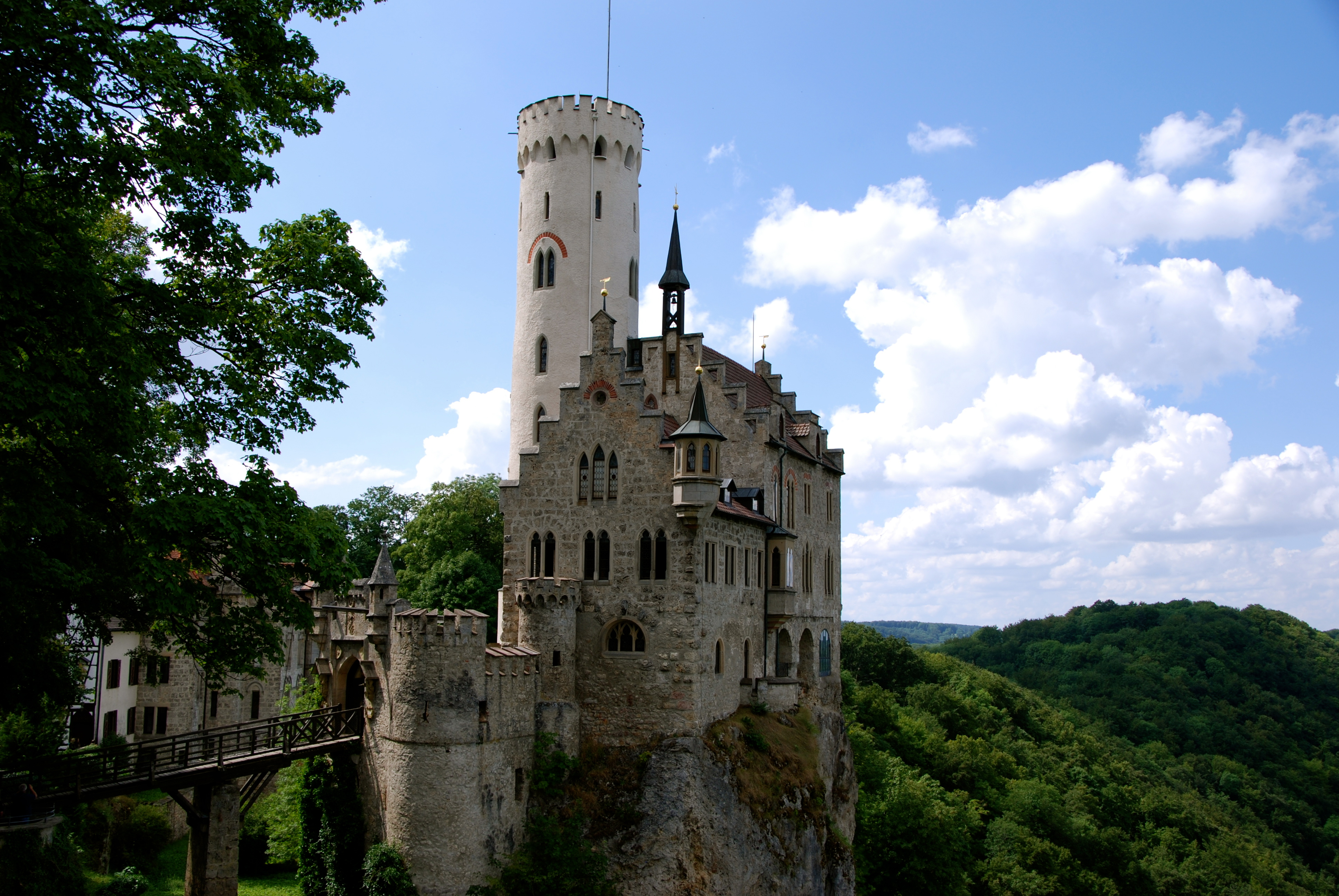
The Old Vanderburgh County Jail is modeled after Lichtenstein Castle.

The Old Jail is rich in exquisite examples of 19th century American architecture. The stone building itself is designed to invoke fear in the observer. Its exterior consists of step-gables, projecting turrets, crenelated roof lines, simulated portcullis, and a central keep, or rounded tower. The entrance presents pointed arches to lengthen the appearance of this part of the building. All of these elements add to the castle-like appearance of the structure.

The Old Jail is modeled after Lichtenstein Castle. It was designed by architect Henry Wolters, who was also the architect responsible for designing the Old Vanderburgh County Courthouse. Both structures were built at the same time and still have a tunnel that connects them. The tunnel can still be accessed from Woods & Woods law office.

== History ==
The Old Vanderburgh County Jail was completed in 1890 and housed inmates until 1967. It sat empty and dilapidated until renovations started in the 1990s. It was placed on the National Register of Historic Places in 1970.

The Old Jail was the site of a race-riot in 1903 after an African-American male shot a white police officer. The violence raged throughout the night and by morning on July 5, 1903, 12 people were dead. One of the deceased was a 12-year-old-girl who was accidentally shot in her parents' carriage. 300 state militia members were sent to Evansville after the governor declared martial law.

== Former Vanderburgh County Sheriff's Residence ==
The Former Vanderburgh County Sheriff's Residence was built in 1891, and is a 2 1/2-story, rusticated limestone building modeled after Schloss Lichtenstein. It features a central round tower or "keep", stepped gables, crenellated roofline, and turrets.

It was added to the National Register of Historic Places in 1970.

== Notable inmates ==
Leslie Irvin, a.k.a. "Mad Dog," was a serial killer that terrorized southwestern Indiana from December 2, 1954, to March 28, 1955. His case went to the U.S. Supreme Court and set legal precedence for pre-trial publicity.

== Current use ==
Following several years of renovations in the late 1990s, the Old Jail was brought back to her former glory. The Old Jail is now the headquarters of Woods & Woods veterans disability benefits attorneys.
