= Sallie Robinson =

American activist

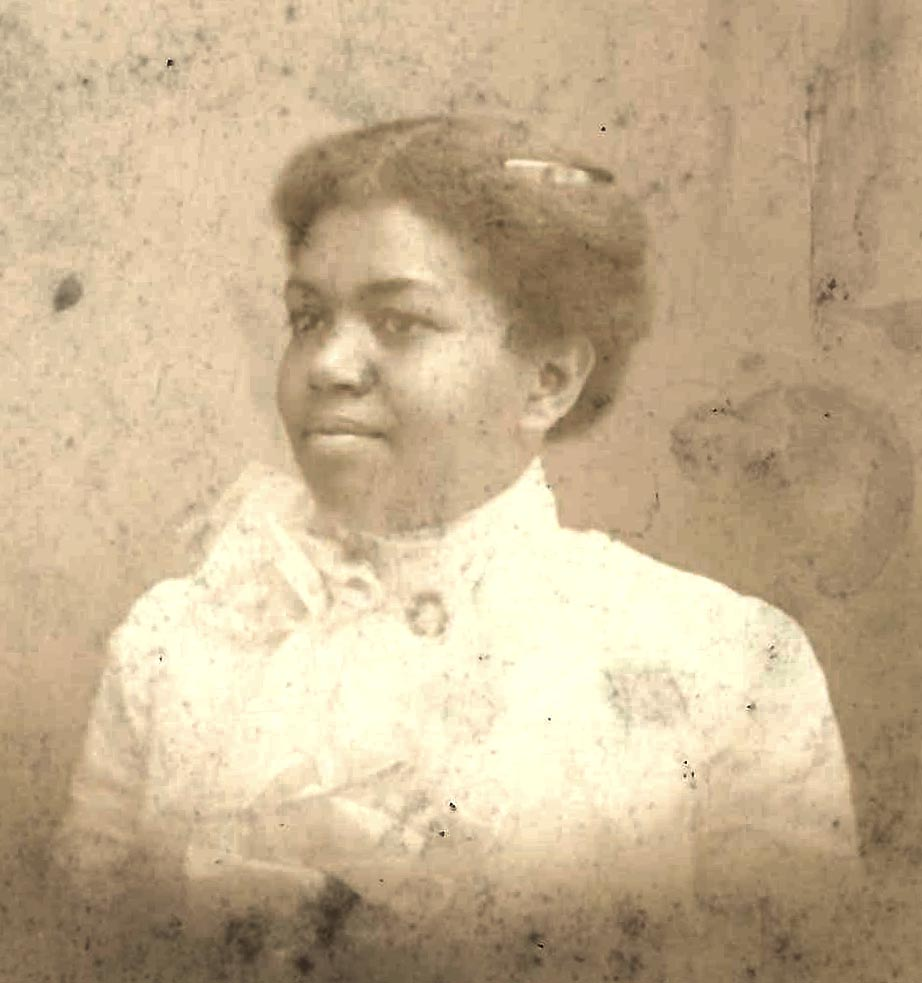

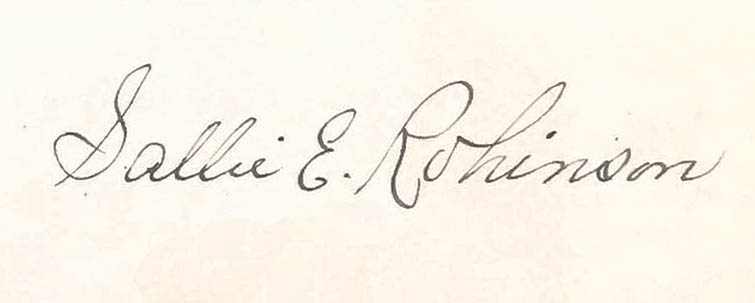

Sallie E. Robinson, also listed as "Sallie J." in some early newspaper references (born March 17 1851), a 19th-century African-American civil rights activist.

On the evening of May 22, 1879, Sallie Robinson, a 28-year-old black woman, bought two first-class tickets at Grand Junction, Tennessee, for a train trip to Lynchburg, Virginia. Shortly after midnight she and her nephew, Joseph Robinson, described as a young black man "of light complexion, light hair and light blue eyes," boarded the train and started into the parlor car. The conductor held Robinson back ("bruising her arm and jerking her roughly around," she alleged) and pushed her into the smoking car.

A few minutes later, when Joseph informed the conductor that he was Robinson's nephew and was an African American, the conductor looked surprised. In that case, he said, they could go into the parlor car at the next stop.

The Robinsons finished the ride in the parlor car but filed complaints with the railroad about their treatment and then sued for $500 under the federal Civil Rights Act of 1875. At trial, the conductor testified that he had thought Joseph to be a white man with a black woman and his experience was that such associations were "for illicit purposes." The jury found for the railroad and the Robinsons appealed to the U.S. Supreme Court, where they lost.

== See also ==
- List of 19th-century African-American civil rights activists
