= Knights of Pythias Temple (Louisville, Kentucky) =

- U.S. National Register of Historic Places
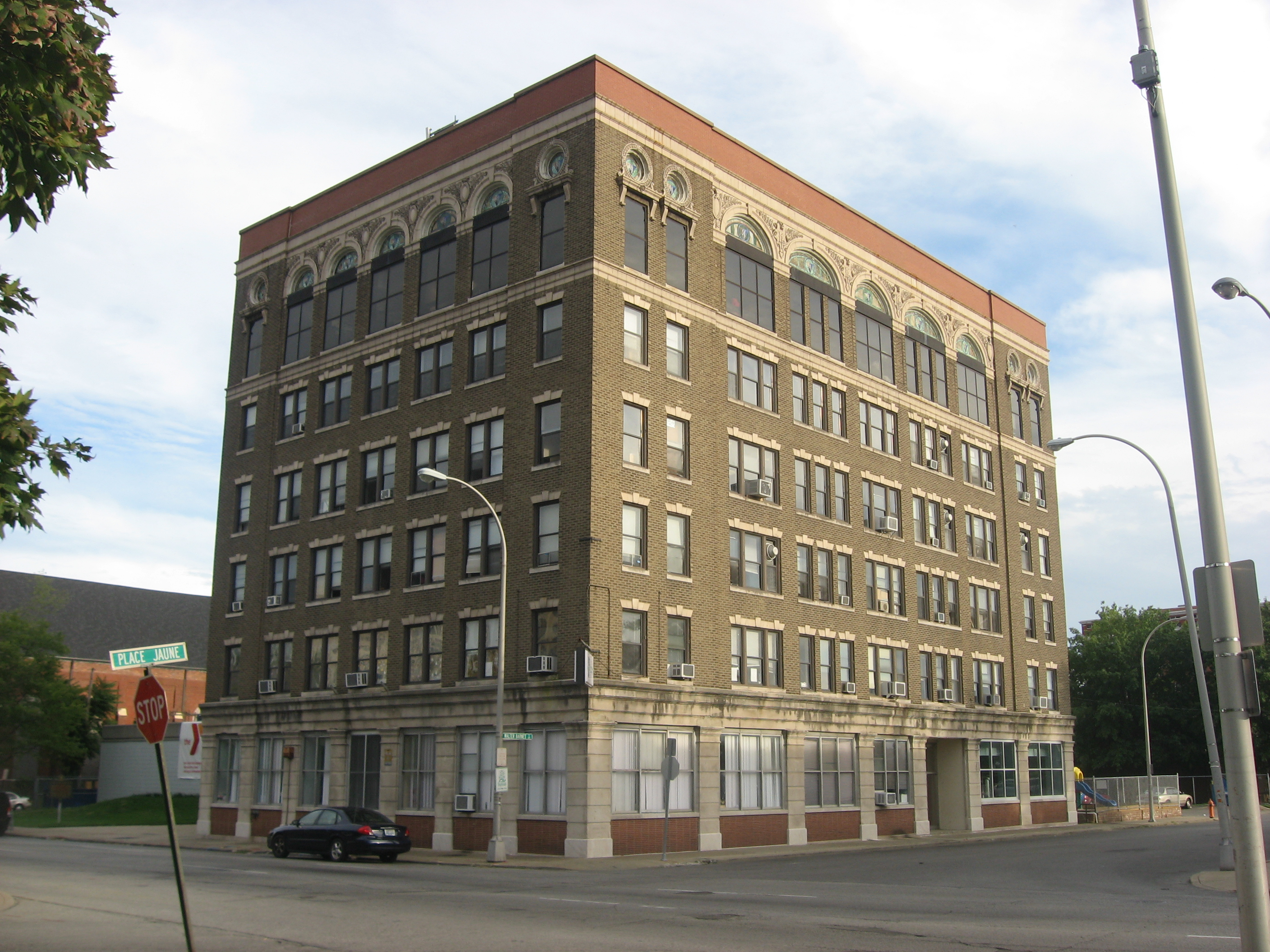
- Front and western side

- Location within Kentucky Location within the United States
- Location: 928-932 W. Chestnut St., Louisville, Kentucky
- Coordinates: 38°14′58″N 85°46′3″W
- Area: 0.4 acres (0.16 ha)
- Built: 1914-15
- Architect: Wolters, Henry
- NRHP reference No.: 78001358
- Added to NRHP: November 29, 1978

The Knights of Pythias Temple in Louisville, Kentucky, also known as Chestnut Street Branch-Y.M.C.A., was built in 1914–15. It was designed by Henry Wolters. It is a buff-colored brick building with limestone trim.

It was built as the state headquarters for the Knights of Pythias of North America, South America, Europe, Asia, Africa and Australia organization in Kentucky. By 1916, there were thirteen chapters of the black Knights of Pythias listed in Louisville, most meeting at this new Pythian Building.

It was listed on the National Register of Historic Places in 1978.
