= Todd Building =

Coordinates: 38°15′20.3″N 85°45′22.5″W

The Todd Building, also known as the Belleview Building, was constructed at the northeast corner of Fourth and Market Streets in Downtown Louisville in 1902. It was developed by and named for James Ross Todd (1869–1952), an influential Louisville banker, businessman, and Republican Party Official.

The ten-story structure was designed by the partnership of Charles Julian Clarke and Arthur Loomis, one of Louisville's prominent architectural firms at the beginning of the twentieth century.

For nearly three decades the Todd Building was one of Louisville's leading office addresses, housing many financial, insurance, real estate, legal, and railroad firms. Occupancy declined during the Great Depression and World War II, when its major tenants were New Deal and defense agencies that required inexpensive office space. In 1940, Todd gave the building to Children's hospital, which sold it to the Hoffman Realty Co. of Evansville, Indiana, in 1944. Occupancy continued to decline during the 1960s and 1970s as tenants moved to newer quarters. It was demolished in 1983 to make way for a new state parking garage to support the Kentucky International Convention Center.
