= Tyler Block =

- Formerly listed on the U.S. National Register of Historic Places
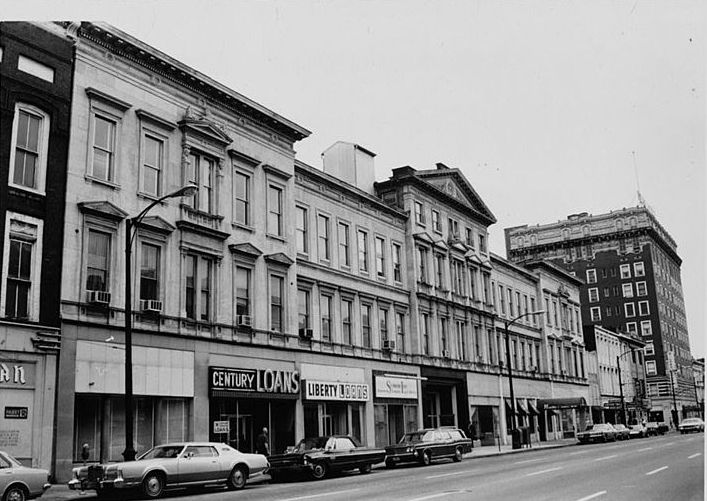
- Tyler Block in the early 1970s

- Location within Kentucky Location within the United States
- Location: 319 W. Jefferson, Louisville, Kentucky
- Coordinates: 38°15′14″N 85°45′22″W
- Area: 2 acres (0.81 ha)
- Built: 1874
- Architectural style: Renaissance
- Demolished: 1974
- NRHP reference No.: 73002253

Significant dates
- Added to NRHP: October 15, 1973
- Removed from NRHP: April 11, 1975

The Tyler Block was a three-story building in Louisville, Kentucky best known for its landmark 200-foot-wide (61 m) Renaissance Revival limestone facade. It was located on the north side of Jefferson Street between Third and Fourth streets. Built in 1874, it was designed by Henry Wolters and named after owner Levi Tyler. It was razed 100 years later in 1974 to make way for what is now the Kentucky International Convention Center. Many campaigned to have the Tyler Block's facade incorporated into the center, but the new building was instead built in the then fashionable brutalist architecture style.

The building was listed on the National Register of Historic Places in 1973.
