= Isaac Myers =

American labor leader (1835-1891)

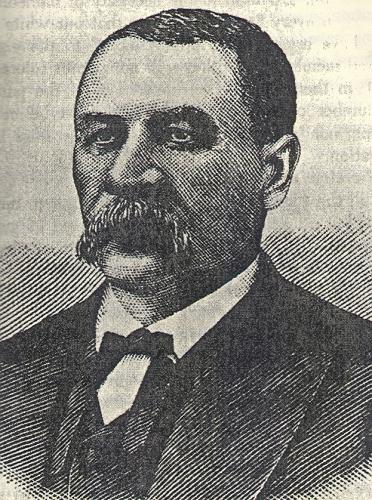
- Isaac Myers, pioneer of the African-American trade union movement circa 1875.
- Born: January 13, 1835; Baltimore, Maryland
- Died: January 26, 1891 (aged 56); Baltimore, Maryland
- Resting place: Laurel Cemetery
- Occupations: Caulker, trade unionist
- Known for: African American labor organizing

Isaac Myers (January 13, 1835 – January 26, 1891) was a pioneering trade unionist, a co-operative organizer and a caulker from Baltimore, Maryland. He was African American.

== Biography ==
Myers was born as a free black in Maryland, a slave state. Since the state of Maryland did not offer public education for African American youth, Myers had to acquire his early education from a private day school run by Rev. John Fortie. At the age of 16 he began work as a caulker, sealing seams in ships. In the 1850s Myers married Emma V. Morgan, who died in 1868. They had three children, including political activist George A. Myers. He later married Sarah E. Deaver. In 1860, Myers left caulking to work in a grocery business leading him to set up a short lived co-operative grocery in 1864. He returned to caulking in 1865.

After the American Civil War, competition for jobs led to strikes and protests by white workers, causing more than 1,000 black caulkers to lose their jobs. Myers proposed the workers collectively pool resources and form a co-operative shipyard and railway, the Chesapeake Marine Railway and Dry Dock Company, to provide themselves with employment. The co-operative, opening in February 1866, was initially a great success, employing over 300 black workers before eventually closing in 1884.

Myers and others also established the Colored Caulkers Trade Union Society in 1868, to which he was elected president. The National Labor Union took interest, inviting the Colored Caulkers Trade Union Society to their annual convention. The move was significant for what had previously been an all-white union, but black workers continued to face opposition to membership. In response the Colored National Labor Union was established in 1869, with Myers as president. He was succeeded in 1872 as president by Frederick Douglass.

Following his departure from the CFNL, Myers continued working and contributing to the labor movement. He became increasingly involved in the Republican Party during the 1870s. He worked as both a Customs Service agent and as a postal service agent under President Ulysses S. Grant's abolitionist Postmaster General John Creswell. He was the first known African American postal inspector, serving from 1870 until 1879, after which he returned to operate a coal yard in Baltimore. "Myers also organized and became President of the Maryland Colored State Industrial Fair Association, the Colored Business Men's Association of Baltimore, the Colored Building and Loan Association, and the Aged Ministers Home of the A.M.E. Church".

The Frederick Douglass - Isaac Myers Maritime Park in Baltimore is named after Myers.

Myers died on January 26, 1891. The crowds at his funeral in Baltimore were so large, members of the Knights Templars organization had to break a path through the crowd. He was interred in Laurel Cemetery.
