= Robert Fox (activist) =

African-American activist

- Born: c. 1846; Kentucky, United States
- Occupations: Undertaker, grocer
- Years active: 1870-71
- Known for: Louisville bus boycott
- Parent(s): Albert Fox; Margaret Fox

Robert Fox (c. 1846–1933) was an African-American activist who sparked a civil rights battle in Louisville, Kentucky in October 1870 by entering a segregated streetcar. He was born in Kentucky to Albert and Margaret Fox and worked as an undertaker and a grocer. He died in 1933.

== Background ==
In 1870, Louisville's three streetcar companies each set their own rules for Black passengers. The Louisville City Railway's Main Street line reserved rear seats for Black riders of both sexes. The Central Passenger Railroad's Walnut Street line let Black women sit inside the cars but required Black men to ride on the exterior platform. The Citizen Passenger Railway allowed Black women to ride at the back but barred Black men from the cars altogether.

A few months before Fox's protest, in July 1870, Hiram Revels was ejected from a Louisville horsecar. Revels was then serving as the first African-American U.S. senator, representing Mississippi, and the incident drew national attention to Louisville's streetcar policies.

== Streetcar incident and lawsuit ==
In Louisville on October 30, 1870, Fox got in a streetcar with his brother/business partner Samuel and their employee, Horace Pearce. The three men had walked from Quinn Chapel AME Church on Walnut Street, where more than 200 supporters had gathered to watch; the action had been arranged in advance by Louisville's Black community to test the legality of the streetcar companies' segregation rules. They paid their fares and sat down in the white section of the car, in violation of local laws prohibiting black men from riding inside the trolley cars (black women were permitted to ride at the back of the car, but black men were usually only allowed to ride on the platform with the driver or not at all).

When a white passenger named John Russell complained, the driver asked the men to leave. The black passengers refused; other drivers were called to the scene, and the men were beaten and thrown off the car. In response, an angry crowd of African Americans that had gathered outside began to throw dirt clods and rocks at the streetcar, insisting that the men be allowed to ride. The Fox brothers and Pearce returned to the streetcar and again took seats in the 'white' section, this time holding rocks in their hands to protect themselves. The three men were arrested and charged with disorderly conduct. Reverend H.J. Young posted their bail.

The defendants arrived in court the following day represented by Colonel John H. Ward, a white lawyer. Ward argued they had been "exceedingly well behaved" and that the real issue was their exclusion because of race. "It is a small matter to assess a fine of from five to twenty dollars for disorderly conduct, and that to us is no great thing," he told the court, "but it is a great thing for us to know whether or not we are to be debarred from all protection from injustice and wrong. They are good citizens ... and they ask for simple justice and nothing more." At their trial, the defendants were unable to testify because the judge forbade blacks from testifying against whites. They were found guilty and fined $5 each ($99.48 in 2021 money).

Shortly after, Fox filed a charge of assault and battery against the streetcar company in federal court. State courts were not an option because Kentucky law barred Black witnesses from testifying against whites. Fox claimed that separate seating policies based on race were unlawful and the driver's actions were therefore improper. During the following winter, many Black and white Louisvillians boycotted the city's streetcars while awaiting the court's decision. A jury found the company rules to be invalid and awarded damages of $15 to Fox and his fellow riders on May 11, 1871.

== Ride-ins ==
The company defied the jury's finding and continued racially segregated seating. As a result, Louisville black leaders organized "ride-ins" all over the city. Streetcar after streetcar was boarded by African-Americans who took seats in the white section. The drivers, in response, left the cars entirely. On several occasions, black passengers drove the cars themselves, to the cheers of black spectators. Gangs of white youths swarmed into the cars, throwing black riders off them. One incident involved an African-American youth named Carey Duncan. At 7 P.M. on May 12, he boarded a streetcar, walked past the driver and sat down among the white passengers. The driver, following the company directive, did not attempt to throw him off, but instead, stopped the car, lit a cigar and refused to proceed until the black youth left the white area." The governor, the Louisville chief of police and other prominent citizens looked on from the sidewalks, while a large crowd gathered around the streetcar and began to shout at the youth: "Put him out!" "Hit him!" "Kick him!" "Hang him!". Some of them climbed into the car, yelling insults. Carey Duncan quietly refused to move. The crowd dragged him from his seat, pulled his inert body off the car and began to beat him. At that point, Duncan started to defend himself, and the city police intervened.

Duncan was charged with disorderly conduct, and his trial was held in Louisville city court. He was fined, and the judge delivered a warning to Louisville blacks that further ride-ins would be punished.

== Local and national response ==
Louisville newspapers responded by blaming African Americans for the troubles and urging them to stop the ride-ins. "The assumption of their right to ride in the street cars, under the present circumstances, is injudicious, and we hope will not be persisted in," wrote an editor of the Daily Commercial. "To do so may lead to serious trouble." Finally, Mayor John G. Baxter announced he would meet with interested parties on both sides to attempt a settlement.

At the meeting, the streetcar companies finally capitulated, realizing that the federal government was likely to step in and enforce integration if they didn't agree to it themselves. To "avoid serious collisions," the company announced it would allow all passengers to choose their own seating. Afterwards, mixed seating became a common practice. Newspapers around the country commented on the demonstrations and their outcome.

Louisville was the only city in the South where Black riders kept Jim Crow off the streetcars during Reconstruction. When Kentucky passed segregation laws in 1892, streetcars were not included, leaving Black Louisvillians the right to ride without restriction.

In the 20th and 21st centuries, the Louisville ride-ins sparked by Robert Fox and his companions taking a seat in the whites-only section have been viewed by historians as an early example of successful massive but non-violent African-American resistance to racial segregation laws, a method that would be used again in the Montgomery bus boycott and in the Civil Rights Movement of the 1950s and 60s.

== See also ==
- List of 19th-century African-American civil rights activists
- List of people from the Louisville metropolitan area
- History of Louisville, Kentucky
