= Chestnut Street Baptist Church =

Historic church in Kentucky, United States

- U.S. National Register of Historic Places
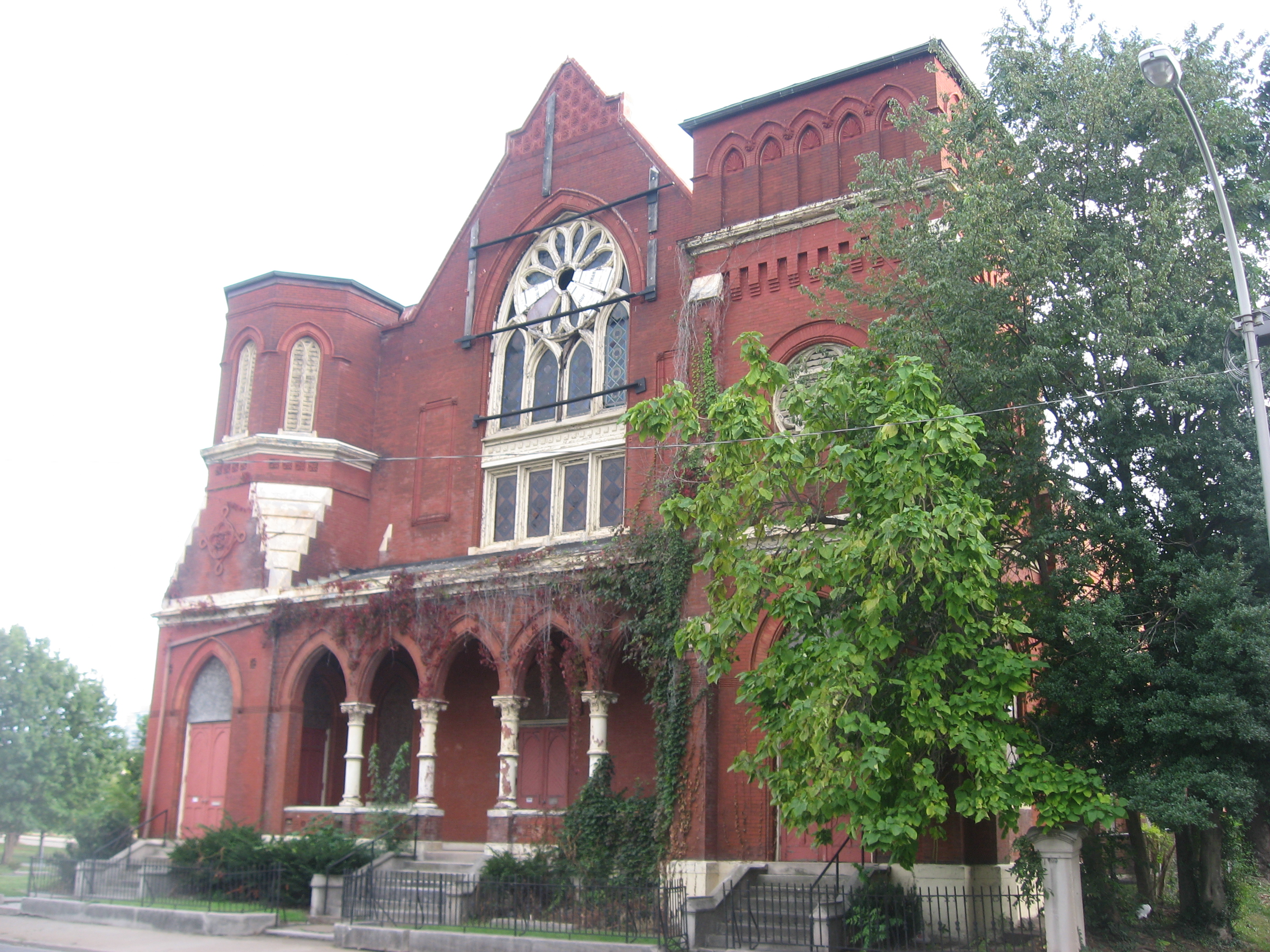
- Front of the church

- Location within Kentucky Location within the United States
- Location: 912 W. Chestnut St., Louisville, Kentucky
- Coordinates: 38°14′58″N 85°46′1″W
- Area: less than one acre
- Built: 1884
- Architect: Henry Wolters
- Architectural style: Gothic
- NRHP reference No.: 80001598
- Added to NRHP: December 03, 1980

The Chestnut Street Baptist Church (also Quinn Chapel African Methodist Episcopal Church) is a historic church at 912 W. Chestnut Street in Louisville, Kentucky. It was built in 1884 and added to the National Register of Historic Places in 1980.

It was deemed significant as "a significant example of Gothic Revival ecclesiastical architecture in Louisville. It is also an important part of the history of one of the city's earliest and most important black congregations."

It was designed by German-born architect Henry Wolters. It is an "ornate Gothic Revival structure. The red brick church is richly ornamented with terra cotta. The facade of the structure consists of a central gabled section with two towers."
