= List of 19th-century African-American civil rights activists =

This list contains the names of notable African American civil rights activists and thinkers who pushed for emancipation, equality, and racial justice during the 19th century.

Although not often highlighted in American history, before Rosa Parks changed America when she was arrested for refusing to give up her seat to a white passenger on a Montgomery, Alabama city bus in December 1955, 19th-century African-American civil rights activists worked strenuously from the 1850s until the 1880s for the cause of equal treatment.

== Activists ==
- Harriet Tubman
- Philip Alexander Bell
- Charlotte L. Brown
- Kate Brown
- Norris Wright Cuney
- Robert Fox
- Nellie Griswold Francis
- Elizabeth "Lizzie" Jennings
- Sallie Robinson
- Frederick Douglass
- Sojourner Truth
- Booker T. Washington
- Ida B. Wells
- Florence Kelley
- W. E. B. Du Bois
