= Colored National Labor Union =

Former United States labor union

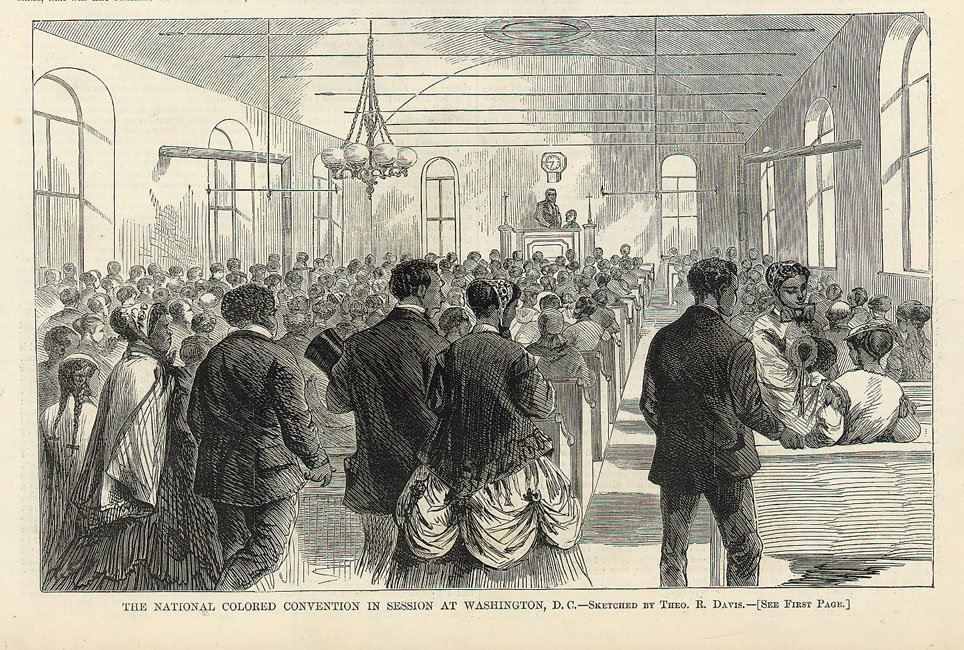
National Colored Convention in 1869

The Colored National Labor Union (CNLU) or National Labor Union was a labor union formed by African Americans to organize their labor collectively on a national level. Established in 1869, the CNLU, like other labor unions in the United States, was created with the goal of improving the working conditions and quality of life for its members.

African Americans were excluded from some existing labor unions, such as when white workers formed the National Labor Union (NLU). William Sylvis, president of the NLU, made a speech in which he agreed that there should be "no distinction of race or nationality" within the ranks of his organization. In 1869 several black delegates were invited to the annual meeting of the NLU, among them Isaac Myers, a prominent organizer of African-American laborers. At the convention, he spoke eloquently for solidarity, saying that white and black workers ought to organize together for higher wages and a comfortable standard of living. However, the white unions refused to allow African Americans to join their ranks. In response to this, Myers met with other African-American laborers to form a national labor organization of their own, in 1869 the National Labor Union, often referred to as the Colored National Labor Union, was formed with Myers as its first president.

The CNLU was established to help improve the harsh conditions facing black workers. Among the goals of the CNLU, which represented African-American laborers in 21 states, were the issuance of farmland to poor African Americans in the South, government aid for education, and new nondiscriminatory legislation that would help struggling black workers.

== History ==
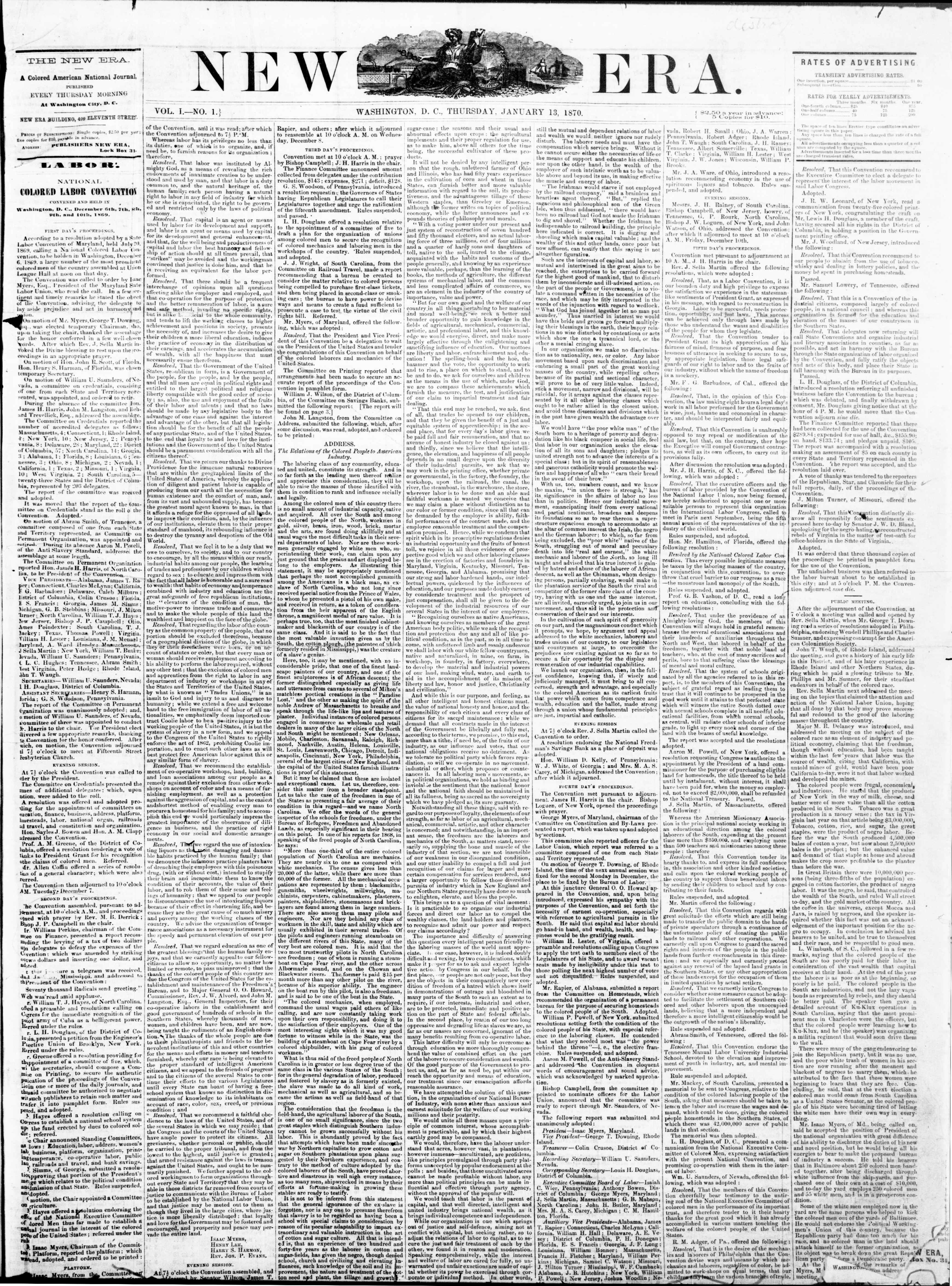
The inaugural issue of New Era in 1870 was devoted to the proceedings of the 1869 CNLU convention

During the 1869 NLU convention, a motion was passed claiming that the organization did not recognize color, but many local unions ignored this ruling and continued to remain segregated. Due to the use of black laborers as strike breakers, there was a great deal of resentment from mostly white unions, who saw them as an enemy. This resentment went both ways, as white strike breakers were also often employed when black workers went on strike. Another issue was that the white working class were the base for violent white supremacist groups, making unity between the two races difficult. There were also disagreements between black and white workers regarding the priorities of labor unions, with white workers more focused on establishing political power and currency reform, while black workers were more concerned with the ability to own and develop property. As such, the black workers broke apart from the NLU and had their own convention later that year, resulting in the creation of the Colored National Labor Union. According to its constitution, the official name for the organization was The National Labor Union. The word colored was added to its name by the media of the time, thus making it the Colored National Labor Union. The CNLU was a post-Civil War organization founded in December 1869 by an assembly of 214 African-American mechanics, engineers, artisans, tradesmen and tradeswomen, and their supporters in Washington, D.C. The organization was created in pursuit of equal representation for African Americans in the workforce. The labor union was organized by Isaac Myers, and elected its first president; civil rights activist Frederick Douglass was selected the president of the CNLU in 1872. Douglass's newspaper New Era was chosen as the official organ of the union. The CNLU sent delegates to the 1870 National Labor Convention, but following the NLU's rejection of black abolitionist attorney John M. Langston's admission during the conference, the CNLU broke off most of its contact with the NLU.

During the first convention of the CNLU in December 1869, 214 delegates met and wrote a petition to Congress. This petition asked for Congress to split public land within the South into farmland to be used by low-income African-American farmers. It also requested that black farmers be given low-interest loans from the government. Another petition was drafted and sent to Congress in 1871, requesting the commission of an investigation into "Conditions of Affairs in the Southern States". Neither of these petitions made much, if any, impact on Congress or the treatment of black workers in the South.

The Colored National Labor Union also established the Bureau of Labor, based in Washington, D.C. The Bureau of Labor was designed to assist workers of color in organizing throughout the country. As President of the CNLU, Isaac Meyers traveled throughout the country, encouraging the organization of black workers and attempting to convince white labor unions to allow workers of color in their organizations. On his trips, he often specifically focused on mechanics and mechanic unions, as he believed that white mechanic labor unions were specifically designed to withhold specific positions from black workers. Unfortunately, upon the CNLU's second annual convention, Myers stated that the organization was not as successful as they had hoped. He claimed that the educational and financial resources provided by the CNLU and the Bureau of Labor were insufficient and noted that the Ku Klux Klan's power in the South prevented the organization of black laborers in certain areas.

While Meyers had warned against the CNLU becoming a primarily political body, as opposed to a trade union party, the election of Douglass in 1871 reflected the influx of political figures within the organization. Over time, the CNLU became more and more political, to the point where it essentially became a branch of the Republican Party, resulting in less trade-union activity and less contact with trade unions across the country. By 1872, the CNLU had ceased most of its operations and would eventually disband, just as the NLU had when their designation as a political party fractured their organization.

It was not until after World War II in the 1940s that the U.S. government stepped in and created the Fair Employment Practice Commission.
