= Pennsylvania State Equal Rights League Convention =

Series of colored convention events in Pennsylvania (1830–1898)

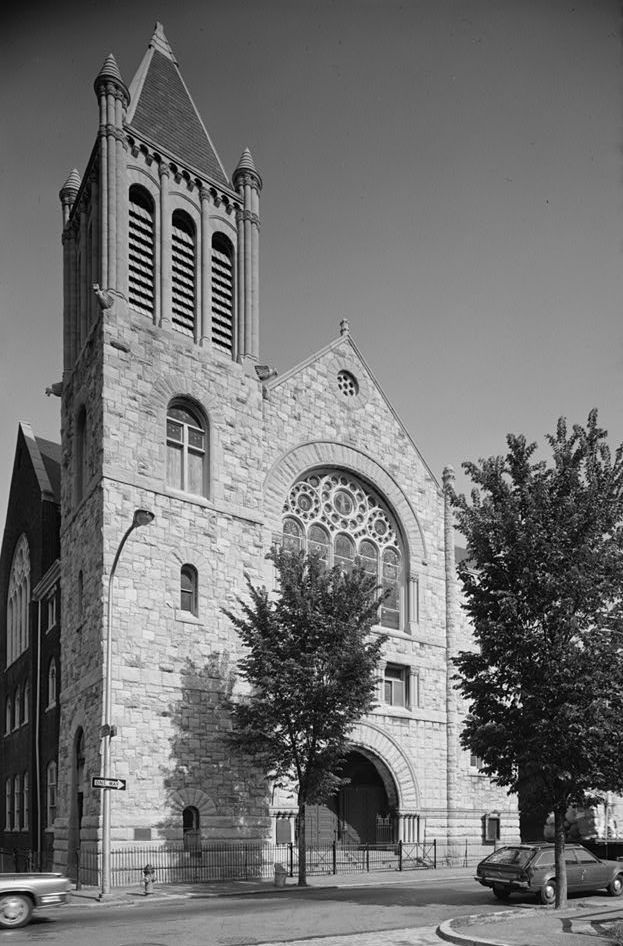
- Mother Bethel A.M.E. Church, Philadelphia, the site of the first colored convention in 1830
- Date: September 15, 1830 – December 31, 1898
- Location: Various cities, Pennsylvania, U.S.

The Pennsylvania State Equal Rights League Convention was a series of Colored Conventions in the 19th century. The convention was one of several social movement conventions that took place in the mid-19th century in many states across the United States.

== History ==
=== 1830 Philadelphia ===
The 1830 convention at Mother Bethel A.M.E. Church in Philadelphia was led by Bishop Richard Allen, the founder of the National Negro Convention. It was held on September 15, 1830, and lasted ten-days. The first convention occurred directly after the 1829 riots in Cincinnati, which was one topic of discussion, other topics included African American land purchase, improving social conditions in the United States, and establishing settlements in "upper Canada". Forty delegates from seven states were in attendance, other leaders during the 1830 convention included James Forten, Rev. Samuel E. Cornish, Rev. Peter Williams Jr., William Hamilton, Philip Alexander Bell, Hezekiah Grice, and James W. C. Pennington.

=== 1831 Philadelphia ===
During the 1831 First Annual Convention of the People of Color at the Wesleyan Church in Philadelphia, Thomas L. Jennings served as the secretary. Fifteen delegates from five states attended the 1831 event, which included leaders such as James G. Barbadoes.

=== 1833 Philadelphia ===
At the 1833 Convention for the Improvement of the Free People of Color held on August 26, 1833 at 526 Pearl Street, Philadelphia, they had a tribute to the late William Wilberforce, who had died weeks earlier on July 29, 1833.

=== 1898 Reading ===
During the 1898 Pennsylvania State Convention of the Afro-American League in Reading, featured 200 delegates endorsing Republican candidate Matthew Quay for re-election as senator. Speakers included the Mayor of Reading, Jacob Weidel; and the founder of the all African-American National Guard unit, William Hilton Catlin.

== List of related events ==
- 1830 First national convention at Mother Bethel A.M.E. Church, Philadelphia
- 1831 First Annual Convention of the People of Color, Philadelphia
- 1833 Third Annual Convention for the Improvement of the Free People of Color, Philadelphia
- 1841 Pennsylvania State Convention of Colored Freemen, Pittsburgh
- 1848 Pennsylvania State Convention of Colored Citizens, Harrisburg
- 1851 Pennsylvania State Convention of Colored People, Sandy Lake
- 1855 Colored National Convention, Franklin Hall, Philadelphia, Pennsylvania
- 1865 Colored People's Convention, Allegheny County
- 1865 Pennsylvania State Equal Rights League Convention, Harrisburg
- 1865 Pennsylvania State Equal Rights League Convention, Harrisburg
- 1866 Pennsylvania State Equal Rights League Convention, Pittsburgh
- 1868 Pennsylvania State Convention of Colored Men, Pittsburgh
- 1868 Pennsylvania State Equal Rights League Convention, Williamsport
- 1869 Pennsylvania State Equal Rights League Convention, Philadelphia
- 1872 Pennsylvania State Equal Rights League Convention, Harrisburg
- 1873 Pennsylvania State Equal Rights League Convention, Wilkes-Barre
- 1874 Pennsylvania State Equal Rights League Convention, Reading
- 1877 Pennsylvania State Equal Rights League Convention, Erie
- 1898 Pennsylvania State Convention of the Afro-American League, Reading

== See also ==
- California State Convention of Colored Citizens
- New York State Convention of Colored Citizens
- Timeline of Philadelphia history
