= Ora Brown Stokes Perry =

American educator, temperance worker, suffragist, and clubwoman (1992–1957)

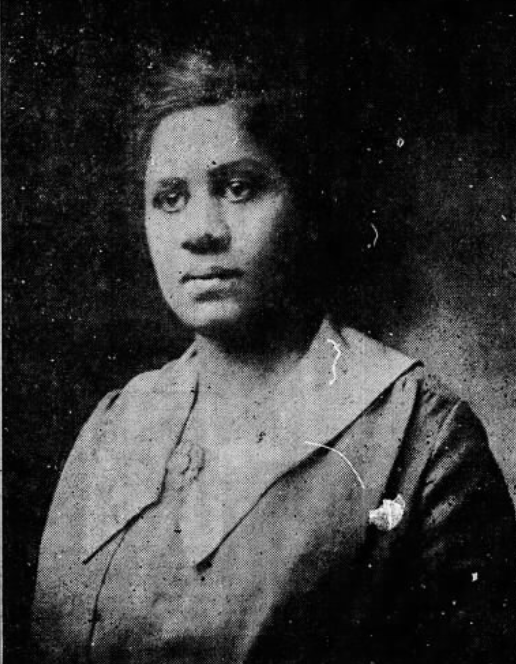
- Ora Brown Stokes (later Perry), from a 1927 newspaper
- Born: 1882; Chesterfield County, Virginia
- Died: 1957 (aged 74–75)
- Occupation(s): Educator, probation officer, temperance worker, suffragist, and clubwoman

Ora Brown Stokes Perry (1882–1957) was an American educator, probation officer, temperance worker, suffragist, and clubwoman based in Richmond, Virginia.

== Early life ==
Ora E. Brown was born in Chesterfield County, Virginia, the daughter of Rev. James E. Brown and Olivia Knight Quarles Brown. She trained as a teacher at Virginia Normal and Collegiate Institute, graduating in 1900. She also studied at Hartshorn Memorial College and the University of Chicago. In 1917, she was refused admission to the newly organized Richmond School of Social Economy because of her race.

== Career ==
Ora Brown Stokes taught school in Milford, Virginia for two years as a young woman, before marrying and taking up the work of a pastor's wife. In 1911, she addressed the Hampton Negro Conference on the topic "The Negro Woman's Religious Activity". "We need women who will demand a clean pulpit as well as a clean pew," she declared, "women who will demand a high and equal standard for men as well as for women." That same year, Stokes co-founded the Richmond Neighborhood Association, holding the first meeting in her own home. Seeing a need for vocational training and housing for African-American women in Richmond, Ora Brown Stokes and Orie Latham Hatcher (a white woman) co-founded the Home for Working Girls. From 1918, she was appointed by Justice John Crutchfield as a probation officer for black women and girls in the juvenile courts of Richmond.

During World War I, she chaired the Colored Women's Section, National Defense of Virginia, and organized the National Protective League for Negro Girls.

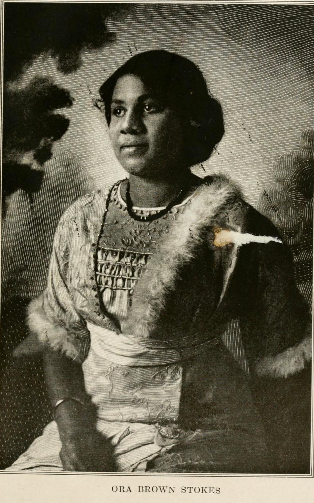
Ora Brown Stokes, from a 1921 publication.

After suffrage, Stokes was head of Virginia's Negro Women's League of Voters, formed when the League of Women Voters in Virginia declined to include black women. In 1921 she was named a non-resident lecturer and member of the faculty at her alma mater, the Virginia Normal and Collegiate Institute, and she gave a speech to the school's alumni association. In 1924, she was Virginia chair of the Colored Women's Department of the Republican National Committee, but later described the experience as frustrating. In 1927, Stokes was elected president of the Southeastern Association of Colored Women's Clubs. In 1928, when she addressed the national meeting of the League of Women Voters, she was listed as president of the National Independent Order of Good Shepherds. In 1940, she was at the organizational meeting of the National Association of Ministers' Wives, organized by Elizabeth Coles Bouey. She was an advisor to the National Youth Administration under Mary McLeod Bethune, was vice-president of the Negro Organization Society of Virginia, was vice-president of the National Race Congress, and was national field secretary for the Women's Christian Temperance Union.

In 2018 the Virginia Capitol Foundation announced that Stokes Perry's name would be included on the Virginia Women's Monument's glass Wall of Honor.

== Personal life ==
Ora Brown married twice. Her first husband was William Herbert Stokes, a minister at Richmond's Ebenezer Baptist Church; they married in 1902. She was widowed in 1936. In 1948 she was married again, to physician and hospital administrator J. Edward Perry, the widower of Fredericka Douglass Sprague Perry. She died in 1957, aged 75 years.
