= Howard Bell =

Howard Bell may refer to:

- Howard H. Bell (1913–2012), scholar of African American history
- Howard A. Bell (1888–1974), British angler
