= Niagara conference =

Niagara conference may refer to:

- Niagara Bible Conference, held 1876 to 1897
- Niagara Falls conference, held 1905
- Niagara Falls peace conference, held 1914
