= Hezekiah Grice =

African American activist (c. 1801 – 1863)

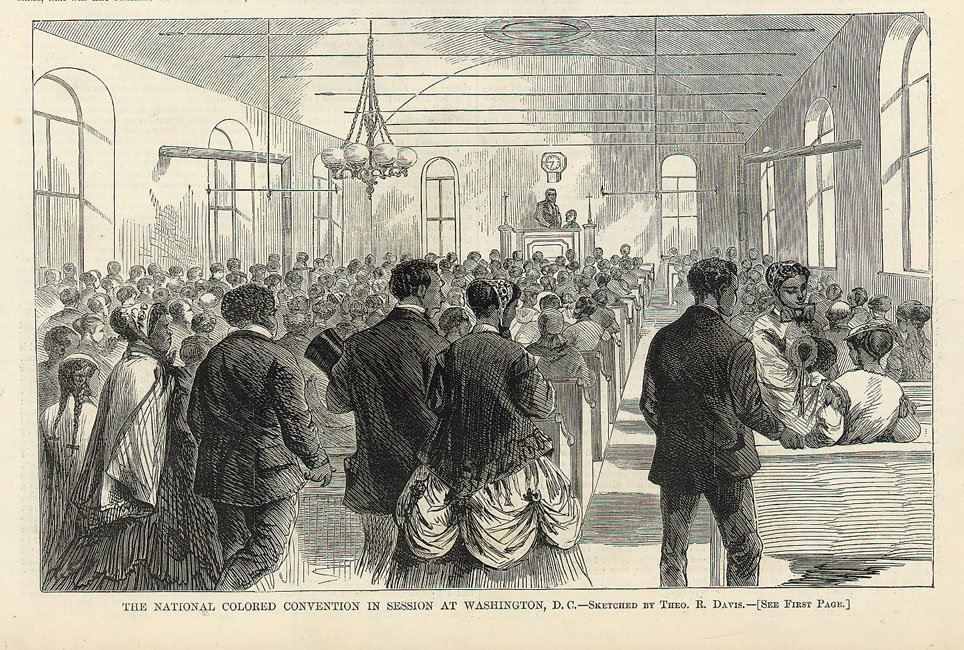
- A National Colored Union Convention, one of a series of conferences that Grice co-founded
- Born: c. 1801; Calvert County, Maryland
- Died: 1863; Haiti
- Occupations: Activist; Machinist; Inventor
- Known for: Co-founded the Colored Conventions Movement; Co-founded the Legal Rights Association

Hezekiah Grice (c. 1801 – 1863) was an American and Haitian activist, machinist, and businessman, noted for his political activity in Baltimore during the early 19th century. While working as a machinist in Baltimore, he was either the first person or one of the first people to suggest holding a National Negro Convention to discuss the possibility of mass emigration by African Americans away from the United States. This was the beginning of the Colored Conventions Movement. Grice was also a leading figure in the founding of the Legal Rights Association, which has been credited with helping to clarify citizenship rights in America, as well as with pioneering several important tactics in American civil rights activism. He later moved to Haiti where he could secure full citizenship rights. There he became a prominent tradesman and a confidant of Faustin Soulouque.

== Early life ==
Grice was born in rural Calvert County, Maryland, in the early 1800s. The historian Lucien Holness gives Grice's year of birth as 1801. A biographical sketch of Grice written in 1867 and published in Elevator, the newspaper of the Afro-American League of California and the American Citizens' Equal Rights Association of the State of California, listed his date of birth as being "in the early part" of the 19th century, but not exactly known. The same biography stated that Grice was "of free parentage".

Despite Maryland's status as a slave state during the first half of the 1800s, Grice did receive some formal education and he became a machinist. Martha S. Jones wrote that, when he was young, Grice had "thrown off the obligations of apprenticeship" and migrated to Baltimore, where he was living by the 1820s. Through his formal education and his work as a machinist Grice became a skilled mathematician, and he was noted for talent as an inventor. He was also fluent in French. As he grew more politically active, Grice became affiliated with contemporary abolitionist editors like William Lloyd Garrison and Benjamin Lundy.

== Activism ==
=== First National Negro Convention ===
Grice was an activist and businessman in Baltimore during the beginnings of the Back-to-Africa movement, when large African American organizations first began to consider the prospect of mass immigration from the United States to countries with less restriction on the freedom of Black people. Around 1830, one proposal that was the topic of national discussion among African American activists was the possibility of emigrating to a region in Canada to which many formerly enslaved people had already escaped. This proposal was a response to the events surrounding the Cincinnati riots of 1829, and the efforts by the American Colonization Society to pressure African Americans to leave America for Liberia. Grice has been credited with being the first person to call for a national convention to discuss the idea of mass immigration to Canada. However, Martha S. Jones has written that it is not clear whether Grice was the first person to suggest such a conference, or if he was simply responding to and amplifying a call for a convention that had previously been made by activists in New York. But Jones writes that what is obvious is that Grice's leadership was foundational in turning the conference into a reality and in creating a national conversation on the colonization proposals. Grice has therefore been called "the moving spirit" of the national convention idea, and he organized it by sending letters to Black leaders across the United States. The meeting itself was called by the Philadelphia bishop Richard Allen. It became the first National Negro Convention, held on September 15 to 24 of 1830, at the Mother Bethel A.M.E. Church in Philadelphia. The agenda of the convention included general discussion on the advisability of mass emigration by African Americans away from the United States, the possible locations that they could move to, and the specific feasibility of the salient proposal to move to Canada. Although the convention did not produce any clear consensus on these issues even among the 40 attendees, it has been studied as an early example of African American activists freely assembling to plan concerted action to combat their oppression, and it kickstarted the Colored Conventions Movement. The conference also suggested possible legal remedies to ensure citizenship rights for free African Americans, as well as practical tools for communal self-sufficiency like the promotion of mechanical trades and agriculture.

Grice is known to have attended at least one National Negro Convention after the one that he initiated. In 1831, Grice missed the second National Negro Convention because at the time he was in Baltimore founding the Legal Rights Association. He was present in 1832, and some sources identify that as the last National Negro Convention that Grice attended; others assert that, in 1833, he attended the third Convention in Philadelphia with his son-in-law William Douglass.

=== Legal Rights Association ===
Although the politics of colonization were contentious and the idea became sharply less popular in the following years, Grice published a map of potential locations in Canada that free African Americans could relocate to. Grice also set up trading partnerships with transportation networks between people in the United States and Liberia. He remained close to John Brown Russwurm, who moved to the American Colonization Society's colony in Liberia.

Much of Grice's activism focused on the denial of full citizenship rights to free African Americans. To understand how African Americans were being denied their rights under Article Four of the United States Constitution, Grice co-founded the Legal Rights Association, with William J. Watkins, Sr. and James Deaver. The Legal Rights Association has been identified as probably the first legal rights convention among African Americans. Continuing on the work of the Convention of 1830 during the previous year, the Legal Rights Association studied the question of what rights African Americans were entitled to, and how they were being denied those rights. Actions by the American Colonization Society and the legislature of Maryland made it clear over the ensuing few years that the aim of many prominent White lawyers and lawmakers, among them Octavius Taney (the brother of Roger B. Taney), was to remove free African Americans from the country entirely.

== Personal life ==
=== Move to Haiti ===
Grice did not remain in the United States long after his activism. In either 1834 or 1835, he chose to move from Baltimore to Port-au-Prince, the capital of Haiti. His motivation was to acquire the full citizenship rights that the United States had refused to grant him, and which he had come to believe would not be granted in the near future. He had a family in Haiti, and became known as a skilled worker due to his expertise as a machinist. Grice's biography in Elevator asserts that he was well known to the rulers of the country and was trusted because he did not engage in Haitian politics. Most notably, Grice became a confidant of Faustin Soulouque, despite Grice's well-known republican ideals. He was particularly prominent in Haiti for inventions that related to the manufacture of sugar. Although Grice never moved back to the United States, he did visit it; he was sent by the government of Haiti to New York to acquire machine parts to build and maintain his sugar manufacturing inventions in Haiti.

=== Family ===
Grice had eleven children: six sons and five daughters. It was speculated by his biographer in Elevator that all eleven of his children were likely born in Haiti, and that by 1867 three of his sons and an unknown number of his daughters had emigrated to America. All of his children were thought to be native French speakers who were also educated in English. One of his children, George Grice, was known to have become a dentist in New York, and another, Francis Grice, had moved to San Francisco by 1867. Francis Grice, a sculptor, wrote on the question of Haitian self-governance. Grice's daughter Elizabeth Grice was the first wife of the abolitionist preacher William Douglass.
