= Negro Organization Society =

American Black advocacy association (1912–1950s)

- Negro Organization Society of Virginia
- Abbreviation: NOS
- Formation: 1912
- Founder: Robert Russa Moton
- Dissolved: 1950s
- Headquarters: Richmond, Virginia, U.S.
- Parent organization: Hampton Institute (now Hampton University)
- Affiliations: Hampton Negro Conference

Negro Organization Society (NOS), also known as the Negro Organization Society of Virginia, was an African American advocacy association and learned society in Virginia, founded in 1912 at Hampton Institute (now Hampton University) by Robert Russa Moton. It sought to build and improve schools for black students, and improve the welfare of black citizens. Its motto was, "Better Schools, Better Health, Better Homes, Better Farms".

== History ==
Founded in 1912, the Negro Organization Society was an outgrowth of the annual interracial Hampton Negro Conference (1895–1912) hosted by the Hampton Institute and brought together Black leaders, particularly throughout the American South, to promote and advertise the progress of Black Americans. The group's membership was entirely Black, but made interracial support one of its primary goals.

Speakers at its 1914 conference held in Richmond, Virginia on November 6 and 7, 1913 which included Booker T. Washington, businesswoman Maggie L. Walker, Virginia governor William Hodges Mann, and Richmond mayor George Ainslie. Washington spoke about progress being made in Virginia, the state's leadership, and the work of the group.

Virginia Commonwealth University has its programme from the 12th annual session held in 1924. In 1924, the Negro Organization Society also worked in intensification of the campaign against tuberculosis within Black communities, which were more greatly affected by the disease.

By the 1950s, the organization dissolved.

== Notable members ==
- J. M. Gandy, of Petersburg; organizer
- Rev. A. M. Gresham, of Phoebus; organizer
- India Hamilton, teacher; chaired the Better Schools Program
- Ora Brown Stokes Perry, teacher; vice-president
- Maggie L. Walker, teacher and businesswoman; vice-president
