= 1848 Colored National Convention =

Event in Cleveland, Ohio, held by the Colored Conventions Movement

The 1848 Colored National Convention was a convention held by free black men as part of the Colored Conventions Movement. The convention was held from September 6 to September 8, 1848, in Cleveland, Ohio, at the courthouse. The convention met to vote on 34 Resolutions.

== The Colored Conventions Movement ==
The Colored Conventions Movement began in the 1830s and sporadically met into 1893. The main goal of the convention movement was to gain freedom and call attention to the constitutional rights of slaves and African American freemen. The conventions consisted of free African Americans from Michigan, Ohio, Illinois, New York, and Canada.

== Members of the convention ==
Members of the convention included Frederick Douglass, a well known equal rights activist, as the president, John Jones as the vice president, and William H. Day as the secretary. Allen Jones (Ohio), Thomas Johnson (Michigan), and Abner Hunt Francis (New York) were added as vice presidents. William H. Burnham and Justin Holland (both from Ohio) were assigned assistant secretaries. Other members included A. H. Francis, Martin Delany, C. H. Langton, D. Jenkins, Henry Bibb, G. W. Tucker, W. H. Topp, Thomas Brown, J. L. Watson, J. Malvin, D. Jenkins, and G. W. Tucker.

== Convention proceedings ==
The convention was called to order on Wednesday, September 6, 1848, at 10:00 a.m. The first session was simply a roll call and to appoint members to various positions. The second session began at 2:30 p.m. on September 6. The president made some remarks then sang a liberty song. Further remarks were made by various members and more songs were liberty songs were sung. More remarks were made and the first day of the convention came to a close. The second day of the convention began at 9:00 a.m. with a prayer from Reverend John Lyle. Roll call was taken and names of those members not present were removed from the rosters. The minutes from the previous day were approved and the convention began to discuss the resolutions. The convention went on recess while discussing the 8th resolution. On Thursday at 2:30 p.m. the convention resumed with a prayer from J. D. Patterson, the minutes from the previous session were addressed and then discussion resumed with the 8th resolution. Thursday was concluded with the singing of "Come join the Abolitionists". Friday, the convention continued at 9:00 a.m. with a prayer by Reverend Kenyon. The convention went on recess after a synopsis of the proceedings was sent for publishing. The final session of the convention convened at 2:30 p.m. A prayer was delivered by Reverend William Ruth.

== Topics discussed at the convention ==
The convention met to discuss many different ways to reject the persecution that the African American people had faced. The convention also gave ways to help the African American people become more equal to the white man. The convention suggested that the African Americans need to become more educated and not work for the white man but work with the white man. The African Americans must expand their minds and become more educated, and shame those who oppose the equality of all man. To do this, it is suggested, that newspapers and books be read to improve the minds and elevate the African Americans to the level of the white men.

The Resolutions were as follows:

1. Opposing derogatory things and wanting equality

2. The elevation of all classes should be equal.

3. All classes should have the same access to knowledge of trades and jobs

4. That being a servant or domestic is degrading, and should be avoided when possible

5. Education is important, and children especially should at least get a business education

6. An association is recommended to unite the people and to concentrate the efforts of freedom and equality

7. That we will try to be moral and aware of the political actions of the times, but liberty and humanity are the most important.

8. That no person or establishment will be supported unless they are for equal rights and privileges

9. Liberty is the most important thing and should not be compromised

10. Nothing is worse than slavery and that everything must be done to discontinue the practice

11. in order to support the people it is imperative that we know the status of our people, and that ministers and others throughout the North States take census and that this information be forwarded to the next National Convention.

12. Remaining sober is a great way to elevate the class and that societies should be formed to promote this

13. That supporting the Free Soil Party and the Buffalo Convention is highly encouraged, but we should be characterized as abolitionists.

14. That Liberty is a right to all man, and as such it is recommended to attempt escape at every favorable opportunity.

15. That we will aid our brethren still enslaved to escape.

16. That children should attend schools.

17. That the establishment of a party in support of Free Soil be established with the platform of “Free Soil, Free Speech, Free Labor and Free Men” and that all should support and encourage others to support this party.

18. That the motto be “Love to God and man, and Fidelity to ourselves”

19. Jefferson Fitzgerald was asked at the 1845 convention to assess the land and that Oceana and Mason county in Michigan were recommended that land be purchased there.

20. That the convention gives thanks to the president, Frederick Douglass, for his ability to remain impartial while presiding over the convention

21. That the convention concludes at 6 pm on September 8, 1848, without further meetings.

22. That they recognize their lack of military tactics and arms, and that they want to learn to be more prepared and better armed and will appoint committees called Vigilant Committees

23. That the convention thanks Judge Andrews and the Bar of Cleveland for allowing the use of the courthouse and that the newspaper the conduct and efficiency of the North Star, a newspaper edited by Frederick Douglass and M. R. Delany, is instrumental to elevate the people and as such should be supported by the people

24. That annual conventions meet and appeal to the legislatures to repeal Black Laws and all laws against slaves and African Americans.

25. That “taxation and representation ought to go together” and we are in doubt of the morality of paying taxes without being represented.

26. The Christian American Churches supported slavery and as such no confidence is given in their practices and are henceforth condemned.

27. That similar Convention that support and fight for suffering humanity be supported.

28. That the next convention be held in Detroit or Pittsburgh in 1850.

29. That we condemn the American Colonization Society for their deception and hypocrisy.

30. That thanks be given to the people of Cleveland for their help in the convention.

31. That in the sight of God, prejudice against color is vulgar and unnatural.

32. That it is ok that we give lectures and can get paid as long as they are speaking positively about the mission.

33. We believe in the equality of sexes and that women are encouraged to take part in future conventions.

34. That condemnation of white people only encourages prejudice and should be stopped immediately.

== Women in the movement ==
Although women were not a clear part of this convention, Resolution 33 was amended to read that "Whereas, we fully believe in the equality of sexes, therefore, that we hereby invite females hereafter to take part in our deliberations."
