= New York State Convention of Colored Citizens =

- Date: August 18, 1840 – December 31, 1891
- Location: Various cities, New York, U.S.

The New York State Convention of Colored Citizens was a series of colored convention events active from 1840 until 1891 in various cities in New York state. The convention was one of several social movement conventions that took place in the mid-19th century in many states across the United States.

== Description ==
The Albany convention was held on August 18–20, 1840, and discussed a number of topics including politics, race relations, and the state of African-American businesses.

The 1857 New York State Convention of Colored Citizens was held on September 23–24, 1857 at Spring Street Hall in New York City, with chair Rev. James Scott, and secretary W. J. Watkins. Topics varied and included ending slavery with a focus on southern states, and current issues facing Black Americans in New York state. Attendees of the 1857 event included abolitionist Jeremiah Powers, Willis Augustus Hodges, and Rev. Henry Highland Garnet.

New York state held a many national conventions (including in New York City, Buffalo, Troy, and Rochester); including the Buffalo convention in 1843, and the Troy convention in 1847. The 1853 National Convention of the Free People of Color in Rochester was attended by Stephen Smith, who was an abolitionist also active in the Pennsylvania conventions.

== List of related events ==
=== State events ===
- 1840 New York State Convention of Colored Citizens, Albany
- 1841 New York State Convention of Colored Citizens, Troy
- 1843 New York State Convention of Colored People, Rochester
- 1844 New York State Convention of Colored Citizens, Schenectady
- 1845 New York State Free Suffrage Convention, Geneva
- 1851 New York State Convention of Colored People, Albany
- 1854 New York State Council of Colored People, Albany
- 1855 New York State Convention of Colored Citizens, Albany
- 1855 New York State Convention of Colored Men, Troy
- 1857 New York State Convention of Colored Citizens, New York City
- 1858 New York State Convention of Colored Citizens, Troy
- 1863 State Convention of Colored Citizens, Poughkeepsie
- 1866 New York State Convention of Colored Men, Albany
- 1870 New York State Convention of Colored Voters, Syracuse
- 1870 New York State Labor Convention, Saratoga Springs
- 1872 New York State Convention of Colored Men, Troy
- 1874 New York State Convention of Colored Citizens, Utica
- 1891 New York State Convention of the Afro-American League

=== National events ===
- 1843 National Convention of Colored Citizens, Buffalo, New York
- 1847 National Convention of Colored People and Their Friends, Troy, New York
- 1850 Fugitive Slave Convention, Cazenovia, New York
- 1853 National Convention of the Free People of Color, Rochester, New York
- 1864 National Convention of Colored Men, Syracuse, New York
- 1896 Conference of the National Federation of Afro-American Women, New York
- 1909 National Negro Convention, New York City, New York

== See also ==
- California State Convention of Colored Citizens
- Fugitive Slave Convention
- Pennsylvania State Equal Rights League Convention
