= California State Convention of Colored Citizens =

Series of colored convention events in California (1855–1889)

- Date: November 20, 1855 – December 31, 1902
- Location: Various cities, California, U.S.

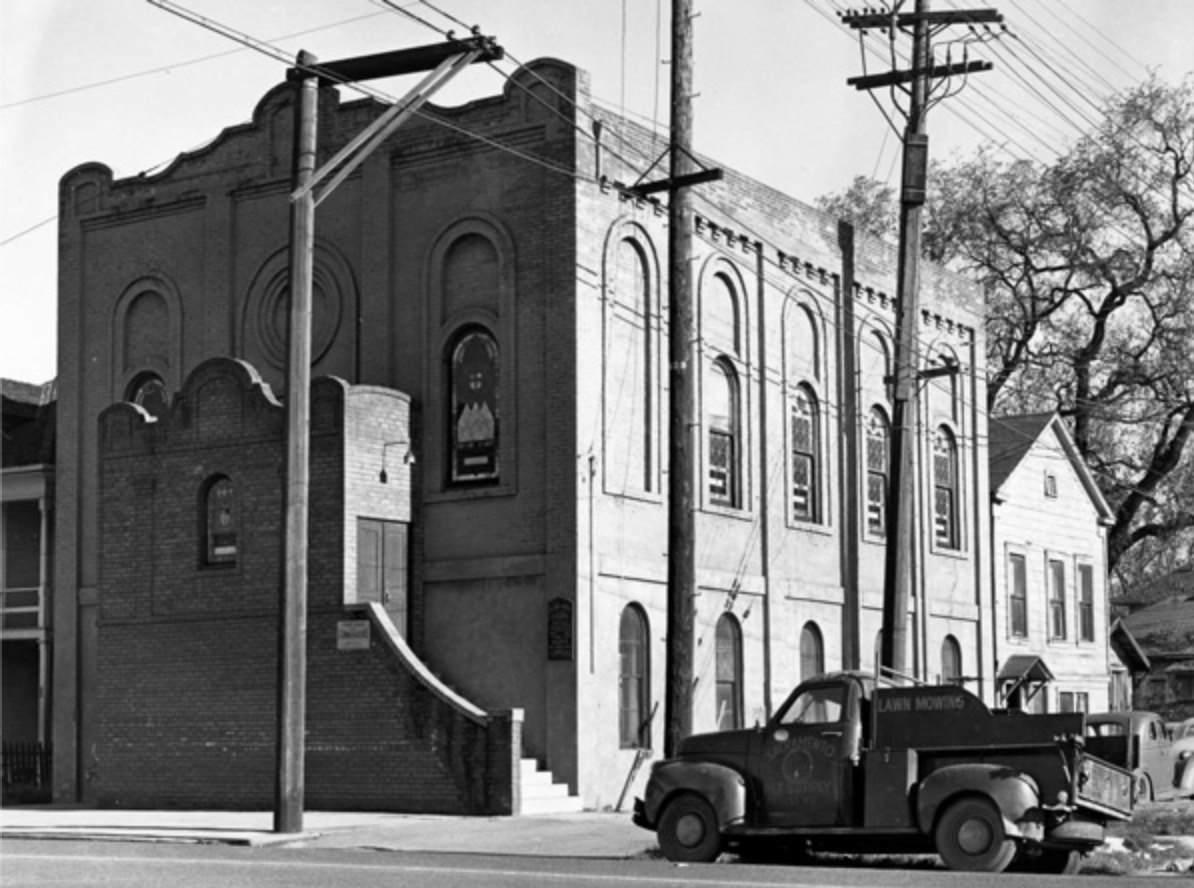
Site of the first CSCC, Saint Andrews A.M.E. Church (c. 1926), Sacramento

The California State Convention of Colored Citizens (CSCCC) was a series of colored convention events active from 1855 to 1902. The convention was one of several social movement conventions that took place in the mid-19th century in many states across the United States.

== Description ==
These events were composed of individuals such as Peter Anderson, Peter Lester, Mifflin Wistar Gibbs, Thomas Marcus Decatur Ward, Edward Duplex, Peter William Cassey, George Washington Dennis, John Jamison Moore, and Jeremiah Burke Sanderson; as well as organizations including churches, literary societies, and social groups from across the state. The goal of these events included the abolishment of slavery, the right to Black testimony, to gain voting rights for Black men, and Black access to public education and public accommodations.

== History ==
=== 1855 Sacramento ===
The first CSCCC event was held on November 20–22, 1855 at Saint Andrews African Methodist Episcopal Church (St. Andrews A.M.E. Church) in Sacramento. The event had 49 delegates that represented 10 counties (out of 27 total counties). In the mid-1850s after the first CSCC, Jonas H. Townsend and Mifflin Wistar Gibbs founded the Mirror of the Times, an African American weekly newspaper in San Francisco; which was financially supported by the CSCC.

Edward Duplex served as a delegate from Yuba County for the first event. Rev. John Jamison Moore was in attendance, and had founded the San Francisco Colored School the same year, a private school for African American students.

=== 1856 Sacramento ===
The second CSCCC event was held on December 9–12, 1865 at the same St. Andrews A.M.E. Church in Sacramento. The 1865 event was shaped by the American Civil War ending and the political issues in the state including Governor Leland Stanford's repeal of California’s testimony ban in 1863. Edward Duplex served as the state executive committee member during the second event.

=== 1857 San Francisco ===
The third CSCCC event was held on October 13–?, 1857 at St. Cyprian's African Methodist Episcopal Church in San Francisco, a church led by Rev. Thomas Marcus Decatur Ward.

=== 1865 Sacramento ===
The CCSCC event held on October 25–28, 1865 at Saint Andrews African Methodist Episcopal Church (formerly Bethel African Methodist Episcopal Church) in Sacramento. They came to a resolution to tax each Black person in order to support and fund Black education, and at the time there was only one secondary school in the state accepting Black students, the Phoenixonian Institute (opened in 1861) in San Jose, California. Rev. Peter William Cassey had helped organize the 1865 event.

== List of events ==
- 1855 California State Convention of Colored Citizens, Sacramento
- 1856 California State Convention of Colored Citizens, Sacramento
- 1857 California State Convention of Colored People, San Francisco
- 1863 California State Convention of Colored People, San Jose
- 1865 California State Convention of Colored Citizens, Sacramento
- 1880 California State Convention of Colored People, San Francisco
- 1889 State Convention of the California Afro-American League
- 1902 State Convention of the California Afro-American League, Oakland

== See also ==
- African Americans in California
- New York State Convention of Colored Citizens
- Pennsylvania State Equal Rights League Convention
- Obediah Summers
- Sweet Vengeance Mine
