= Rockland Farm (Hagerstown, Maryland) =

Historic house in Maryland, United States

- U.S. National Register of Historic Places
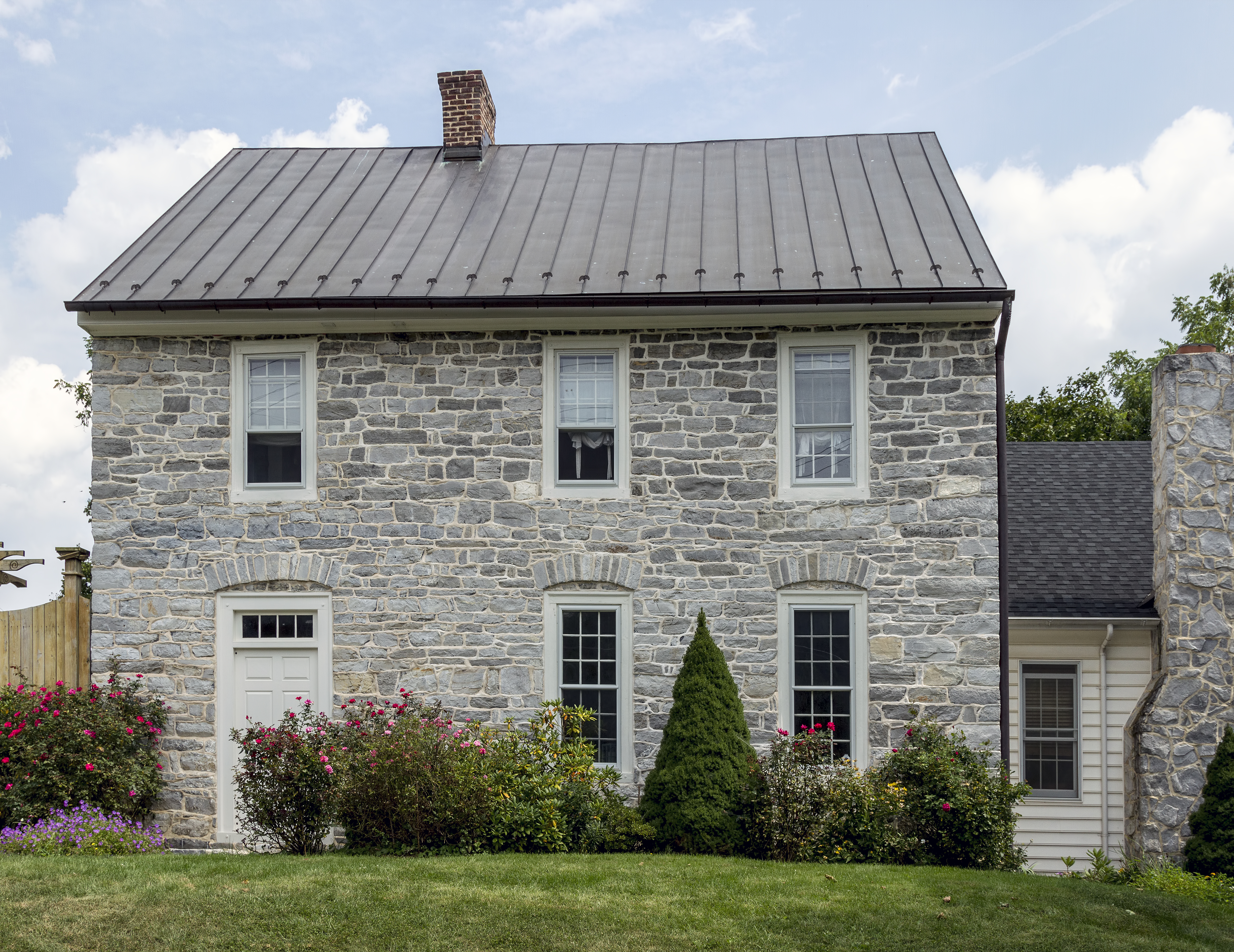

- Location within Maryland Location within the United States
- Location: 728 Antietam Dr., Hagerstown, Maryland
- Coordinates: 39°39′20.81″N 77°41′19.81″W
- Area: less than one acre
- Built: 1773
- NRHP reference No.: 78001483
- Added to NRHP: July 21, 1978

Rockland Farm, also known as Funk Farm or Davis House, is a historic home located at Hagerstown, Washington County, Maryland, United States. It is a two-story, three-bay stone dwelling with white trim built in 1773. Also on the property is a log outbuilding and a 1 1/2-story stone tenant house built over a spring.

Frisby Tilghman ( 1773-1847) enslaved many people at Rockland, including abolitionist James W.C. Pennington James W. C. Pennington, who escaped in October 1827.

It was listed on the National Register of Historic Places in 1978.
