= Atlanta Conference of Negro Problems =

Academic conference series (1896–1914)

- Status: defunct
- Genre: conference
- Begins: 1896
- Ends: 1914
- Frequency: Annually
- Venue: Atlanta University
- Locations: Atlanta, Georgia, United States

The Atlanta Conference of Negro Problems was an annual conference held at Atlanta University, organized by W. E. B. Du Bois, and held every year from 1896 to 1914.

== Purpose ==
The purpose of the Atlanta Conference of Negro Problems was to outline the many difficulties that the black community faced, to suggest solutions to these problems, and to publicize grievances with modern social protocols. This organization attempted to come up with solutions for the then-current problems facing the black community.

Both African Americans and whites resided at Atlanta University in 1897; though many universities were similar in that respect, Atlanta University was unique in that black students and white faculty used the same dormitories and dining hall, and the smaller number of white students used the same space as well. The state of Georgia gave no funding to the school, because many of the Georgia state lawmakers actively resisted educational opportunities for black citizens. In fact, Atlanta University, as well as other private schools in the city, were the only options for black high school education, although multiple white public high schools existed in the city.

W. E. B. Du Bois came to Atlanta University as a professor. Many people believed that he was not religious enough (or did not practice the right religion) to teach at the university. Du Bois promised that he would use the Episcopal prayer book whenever he needed to fulfill his student chapel duties, so he was permitted to work there. Du Bois, as a member of the African American community, recognized and deeply cared about the threats that were posed against them. He decided to hold the Atlanta Conference of Negro Problems to discuss various solutions to these problems, whilst contributing to the formation of a more equal society.

Several graduates of Atlanta University told various faculty and trustee members of the school information that made them aware of the need for a thorough investigation into the conditions of living in the Negro populations of cities. As a result, Bumstead and Bradford proposed annual investigations of the social, economic, and physical condition of Black Americans. The "investigation" would be developed into a department called the Atlanta Sociological Laboratory. It was quickly approved by the Atlanta University Board of Trustees, and a conference was set to take place later in the year, during the Atlanta Exposition, guided by Bradford. Later discussion caused the conference to be rescheduled for the spring of 1896.

== Conduct ==
The first two Atlanta University Conferences of Negro Problems were held by George C. Bradford, in 1896 and 1897. Even though he co-founded the Atlanta University Studies and directed these first two conferences, Bradford's contributions to these events have still not been fully investigated. It is often W. E. B. Du Bois who gets the credit for the founding of the annual conference.

The first Conference of Negro Problems at Atlanta University focused on the morality of African Americans in cities. Bradford invited the Department of Labour to help him carry out the study, to tabulate and publish the results. The statistics they collected became the basis of a serious dealing with the social and economic conditions of African Americans.

Du Bois thought that the biggest problem with the early Atlanta University Studies was Bradford's efforts to replicate the Hampton and Tuskegee models. He was determined to execute at Atlanta University what he had previously been unable to get administrators and white institutions to try. This was a program of objective and scientific inquiry into social, economic, and political conditions of African Americans. Another notable problem that the Atlanta University Studies encountered was Bradford's lack of social science background, especially dealing with racial problems. Bradford was a Boston businessman who graduated from Harvard in finance, so was not experienced enough to perfect his studies of black Americans and Atlanta University. The president of Atlanta University, Horace Bumstead, eventually searched for a more qualified figure to lead the research program at the university.

Booker T. Washington attended the Conference at least occasionally, and was well received when he gave the final address at the seventh conference in 1902.

== Consequences ==
One of the most significant results of the studies of the conference was increased state and national aid for African American high schools, resulting from the 1901 study. This study uncovered that the money allocated to maintaining and running Black schools was less than the money allotted to similar White schools. For instance, Delaware, in 1896, gave $1.66 per capita for White students, and $0.81 for Black students. As well, it was uncovered that African Americans were responsible for providing most of the funds to support their schools. There was even an unequal distribution of money for salaries; white teachers earned significantly more than black teachers at the time. Though this may be in part due to differences in education levels achieved, racism still could have been a cause of this as many teachers were required to have the same basic skills. Many Southern states reported, during this study, that the cost of running schools for blacks was entirely supported by donations from African Americans. Upon learning about this, Du Bois called for increased state and national support of these Negro schools.

Change was not immediate, however. Du Bois reinvestigated high school education amidst African Americans a decade later, and found that little change had actually occurred. For example, in 1911, Houston County, Georgia, educated about 3200 blacks and 1050 whites, but funding for Black schools was about $4,500, compared to $10,700 for white schools. During this time, Georgia's funding of public schools was based on a variety of state and local reactions to different laws and court rulings. Plessy v. Ferguson, for instance, made separate but equal public schools for African American and white students acceptable, but although the school systems were supposed to be equal, in practice, they were separate and unequal. Black teachers still earned considerably less than white teachers. To further the inequality, many superintendents did not adequately supervise local Black schools. This poor supervision is outlined in a quotation by Mr. W. K. Tate, who was the state supervisor of elementary rural schools of South Carolina in 1911. He said: "It has been my observation that the Negro schools of South Carolina are for the most part without supervision of any kind. Frequently the county superintendent does not know where they are located and sometimes the district board cannot tell where the Negro school is taught.".

== Publications ==
- Du Bois, W. E. B., ed. (1900). The College-Bred Negro. Atlanta university publications, no. 5. Atlanta University Press. hdl:2027/mdp.39015004123231. LCCN 01010149. OCLC 504552532.

== See also ==
- Colored Conventions Movement
- Hampton Negro Conference
