= Colored Conventions Movement =

Series of conference events in the U.S.

Colored Convention Movement
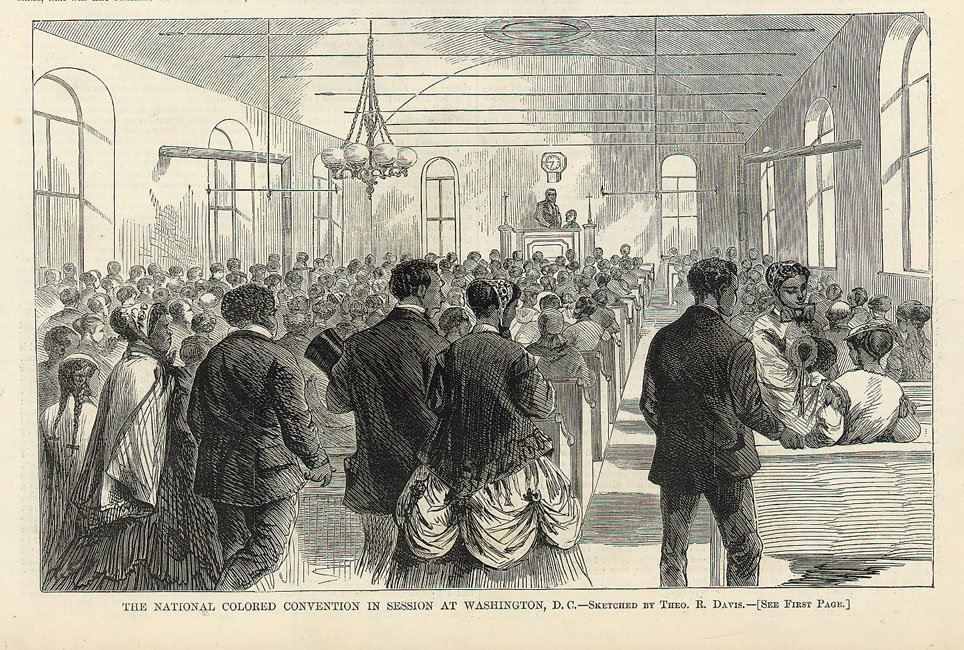
- National Colored Convention, Washington, D.C., 1869
- Nickname: Black Conventions Movement
- Formation: 1830
- Location(s): United States, Canada
- Key people: Richard Allen

The Colored Conventions Movement, or Black Conventions Movement, was a series of national, regional, and state conventions held irregularly during the decades preceding and following the American Civil War. The delegates who attended these conventions consisted of both free and formerly enslaved African Americans, including religious leaders, businessmen, politicians, writers, publishers, editors, and abolitionists. The conventions provided "an organizational structure through which black men could maintain a distinct black leadership and pursue black abolitionist goals." Colored conventions occurred in thirty-one states across the United States and in Ontario, Canada. The movement involved nearly two thousand delegates and tens of thousands of attendees.

The minutes from these conventions show that Antebellum African Americans sought justice beyond the emancipation of their enslaved countrymen: they also organized to discuss labor, health care, temperance, emigration, voting rights, the right to a trial by jury, and educational equality. The Colored Conventions Movement antedated the founding of any formal anti-slavery movement in the United States.

The conventions significantly increased in number following the Civil War. The Antebellum and postwar colored conventions were the precursors to larger, 20th-century African-American organizations, including the Colored National Labor Union, the Niagara Movement, and the National Association for the Advancement of Colored People (NAACP).

== History ==
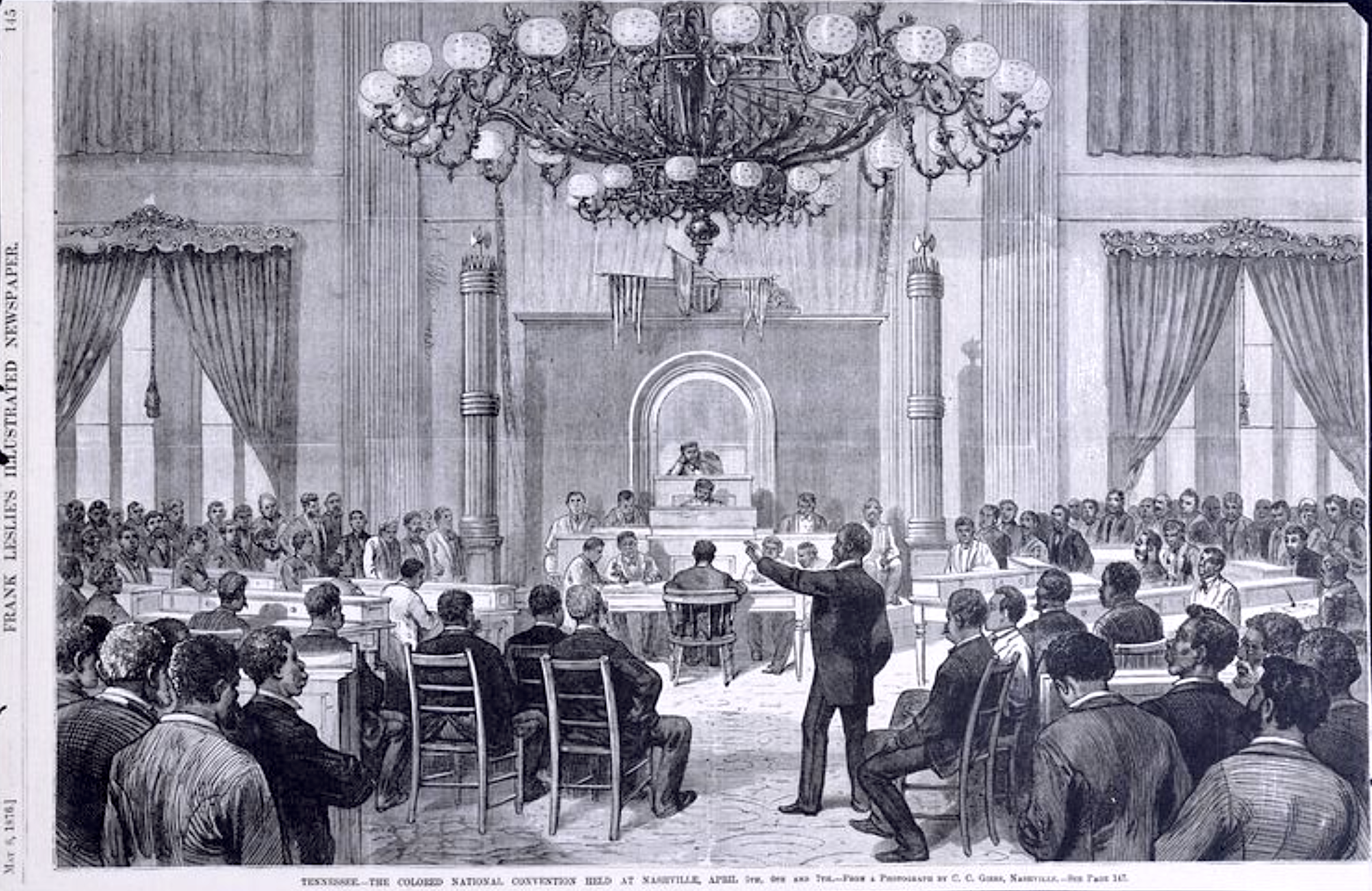
Colored National Convention in Nashville in April 1876

In the early 19th century, national and local conventions involving a variety of political and social issues were pursued by increasing numbers of Americans. In 1830 and 1831, political parties held their first national nominating conventions. Historian Howard H. Bell notes that the convention movement grew out of a trend toward greater self-expression among African Americans and was largely fostered by the appearance of newspapers such as Freedom's Journal, and was first suggested by Hezekiah Grice. The first documented convention was held at Mother Bethel A.M.E. Church in Philadelphia in September 1830. Delegates to this convention discussed the prospect of emigrating to Canada to find refuge from the harsh fugitive slave laws and legal discrimination under which they lived. The first convention elected as president Richard Allen, founder of the African Methodist Episcopal Church (AME), the first independent black denomination in the United States. The idea of buying land in Canada quickly gave way to addressing problems they faced at home, such as education and labor rights.

Philadelphia was the hub of the Colored Conventions movement for several years before nearby cities such as New York City, Albany, and Pittsburgh also started hosting conventions. By the 1850s, the conventions were extremely popular and multiple national, state, and local conventions were held every year. Although the majority of these antebellum conventions were held in northern, particularly New England states, conventions are documented as taking place in Kansas, Louisiana, and California. The conventions attracted the most prominent African-American leaders from across the country, including Frederick Douglass, Charles Bennett Ray, Lewis Hayden, Charles Lenox Remond, Mary Ann Shadd, and William Still.

Following the Civil War, Colored Conventions began to appear in the Southern states as well, with one author noting that "we can not deny that the various conventions of the colored people in the late insurrectionary States compare favorably with those of their white brethren...their resolutions are of an elevated humanity and common sense to which those of the other Conventions make no pretension." More Colored Conventions took place in the South during the late 1860s than the entire antebellum period.

The post-war conventions culminated with the 1869 National Convention of Colored Men in Washington, D.C. The convention delegates wrote a letter congratulating General Ulysses S. Grant for being elected President of the United States, to which Grant responded, "I thank the Convention, of which you are the representative, for the confidence they have expressed, and I hope sincerely that the colored people of the Nation may receive every protection which the laws give to them. They shall have my efforts to secure such protection."

During Reconstruction the national, state, and local Colored Conventions evolved into other kinds of state and national organizations. Delegates at the National Convention of Colored Men in Syracuse, NY founded the National Equal Rights Leagues and attempted to form state-level Equal Rights League chapters across the United States. In response to a denial of African American admittance to the National Labor Union, community leaders formed the Colored National Labor Union (CNLU) in December 1869. Many former Colored Convention delegates, including Isaac Myers and Frederick Douglass, were instrumental in organizing the CNLU.

Colored Conventions continued to take place in the late 1880s and 1890s, including Indianapolis in 1887 and state conventions in New Jersey, Alabama, Louisiana, and Texas. The convention movement slowed by the end of the century.

== Legacy ==
T. Thomas Fortune's National Afro-American League was formed in 1890 and held national and state-level meetings throughout the 1890s. From 1896 to 1914, W. E. B. Du Bois held an annual conference at Atlanta University of national importance. In 1898, bishop Alexander Walters founded the National Afro-American Council, which met annually until 1907 and with Fortune and Booker T. Washington playing prominent roles. In 1905, Du Bois and William Monroe Trotter met near Niagara Falls, Canada, founding the Niagara Movement.

Du Bois' continued activism and relationships forged at these meetings led to the foundation of the National Association for the Advancement of Colored People (NAACP) by Moorfield Storey, Mary White Ovington and Du Bois in 1909.

== List of conventions ==
- 1830 convention at Mother Bethel A.M.E. Church in Philadelphia, Pennsylvania
- 1831 First Annual Convention of the People of Color, Philadelphia, Pennsylvania
- 1832 Second Annual Convention for the Improvement of the Free People of Color, Philadelphia, Pennsylvania.
- 1833 Third Annual Convention for the Improvement of the Free People of Color in these United States, Philadelphia, Pennsylvania
- 1834 Fourth Annual Convention for the Improvement of the Free People of Color in the United States, New York, New York
- 1835 Fifth Annual Convention for the Improvement of the Free People of Color in the United States, Philadelphia, Pennsylvania
- 1835 Convention which Formed the Maine Union in Behalf of the Colored Race, Portland, Maine
- 1837 Convention in Columbus, Ohio
- 1840 New York State Convention of Colored Citizens, Albany, New York
- 1841 State Convention of the Colored Freemen of Pennsylvania, Pittsburgh, Pennsylvania
- 1843 National Convention of Colored Citizens in Buffalo, New York
- 1847 National Convention of Colored People and Their Friends in Troy, New York
- 1848 National Convention of Colored Freemen in Newark, New Jersey
- 1849 State Convention of the Colored Citizens of Ohio, Columbus, Ohio
- 1850 Fugitive Slave Convention, Cazenovia, New York
- 1851 State Convention of Colored Men, Columbus, Ohio
- 1853 State Convention of Colored Citizens, Columbus, Ohio
- 1855 Colored National Convention at Franklin Hall, Philadelphia, Pennsylvania
- 1855 First California State Convention of Colored Citizens, Sacramento, California
- 1857 Convention of Colored Citizens, New York City, New York
- 1858 Convention of Colored Men, Chatham, Canada West; May 8–10, 1858, organized by John Brown.
- 1858 New York State Convention of Colored Citizens, Troy, New York
- 1863 Convention of Colored Men, Poughkeepsie, New York
- 1864 National Convention of Colored Men, Syracuse, New York
- 1865 State Equal Rights' Convention, of the Colored People of Pennsylvania, Harrisburg, Pennsylvania
- 1865 Virginia State Convention of Colored People, Alexandria, Virginia
- 1865 South Carolina State Convention of Colored People in Charleston, South Carolina
- 1865 First Annual Meeting of the National Equal Rights League, Cleveland, Ohio; the "John Brown Song" was sung at the meeting (page 11)
- 1867 Illinois State Convention of Colored Men, Galesburg, Illinois
- 1869 National Convention of Colored Men of America, Washington, D.C.
- 1870 Colored Labor Convention, Saratoga Springs, New York
- 1870 Missouri State Colored People's Educational Convention, Jefferson City, Missouri
- 1871 State Convention of the Colored Citizens, Nashville, Tennessee
- 1873 National Civil Rights Convention, Washington, D.C.
- 1876 Colored National Convention, Nashville, Tennessee
- 1882 Convention of Colored Citizens, Macon, Georgia
- 1883 Convention of Colored Citizens, Norwich, Connecticut
- 1883 Convention of Colored Citizens, Nashville, Tennessee
- 1887 National Convention of Colored Men, Indianapolis, Indiana
- 1889 Colored Catholic Congress, Washington, D.C.; held yearly (with exception) until 1894
- 1895 First National Conference of the Colored Women of America, Boston, Massachusetts
- 1896 Conference of the National Federation of Afro-American Women, New York; merged with other groups to form the National Association of Colored Women, after the 1904 National Association of Colored Women's Clubs, Washington, D.C.
- 1896 Atlanta Conference of Negro Problems, Atlanta, Georgia; and held annually until 1914, organized by W. E. B. Du Bois.
- 1897 Hampton Negro Conference, Hampton, Virginia; and held annually until 1912
- 1905 Niagara Conference, Fort Erie, Ontario, Canada. Organized by W. E. B. DuBois and others.
- 1906 Second Conference of the Niagara Movement, Storer College, Harpers Ferry, West Virginia
- 1907 Third Conference of the Niagara Movement, Boston.
- 1909 National Negro Convention in New York, 50 years after 1859. Includes letter of Wm. Lloyd Garrison on his inability to attend. The proceedings were published, and reprinted in 1969.

== See also ==
- Clifton Conference, series of African American religious conferences
- American Negro Labor Congress, series of African American Communist Party conferences
- George T. Downing
- Henry Highland Garnet
- Henry Moxley
