= Sydna Edmonia Robella Francis =

Sydna E.R. Francis (1815 – May 11, 1889) was an American suffragist and an abolitionist.

== Early life ==
Sydna E.R. Francis, born Sydna E.R Dandridge, in Virginia in 1815 to John and Charlotte Dandridge. Francis moved with her family to New York where her father became a waiter. While there she met and married Abner Hunt Francis, an abolitionist and entrepreneur. The two gave birth to a daughter in 1843 named Theodosia Gertrude Hunt.

She was listed as Mulatto by the US Census in New York (1850) and California (1860), and as Black in Oregon (1860).

== Buffalo, New York ==
While in Buffalo, New York, Francis was the president and co-founder of the Ladies' Literary and Progressive Improvement Society of Buffalo. The organization consisted mainly of black women who were dedicated to gaining suffrage for themselves as well as ending slavery. According to a letter Francis wrote to Frederick Douglass which was printed in The North Star, the group's goal was to "promote, so far as possible, every branch of literature, art, and science, and encouraging every political reform, which tends to secure human rights or character." The Ladies' Literary and Progressive Improvement Society also worked with other women's groups across the country. Shortly after the group's founding they received a five dollar donation from the Independent Order of Daughters of Temperance in Pittsburgh, Pennsylvania which was announced in The North Star. In addition, to women's rights the group also focused on anti-slavery. In late 1848, the Francises stayed at Frederick Douglass's home in Rochester, New York as part of a larger abolitionist organizing. In 1849, abolitionist Gerrit Smith came to speak to the group and was awarded the "Silver Pitcher" in a private ceremony. Although the group planned and designed the award and ceremony at which Smith spoke at, Smith's appearance was also made possible with the help of Francis's husband Abner Francis and fellow abolitionist Henry Highland Garnet.

== Portland, Oregon ==
In 1851, Francis and her family moved to Portland, Oregon where they were among the few African-Americans in the entire city. Francis, her husband, and her brother-in-law, Issac B. Francis, opened up two businesses: a clothing store and a boardinghouse. They eventually owned residential real-estate that was valued at around $36,000. During 1850s, Abner and Sydna also owned and maintained a residence in San Francisco where Sydna may have spent the majority of her time. Because of their success, Abner and Issac were threatened with expulsion under the Oregon Territory's 1849 Expulsion Law which outlawed settlement of new African-Americans immigrants. They allegedly were reported as English immigrants. The Francis family challenged their expulsion from the territory by creating a petition which was signed by over 200 residents before being brought to the Territorial legislature. The petition was received but no legislation passed. Nevertheless somehow Abner Francis and his brother Issac Francis were not expelled.

== Victoria, British Columbia, Canada ==
When James Douglas invited black people to move to Vancouver Island, Francis and her family were one of over 700 families that moved to the island and settled in Victoria in 1862. By the end of 1863, her husband became a British citizen and ran for public office. In 1959, Francis and her husband had already expanded their business interests to Victoria, as her parents lived there. Francis co-owned the house that she and her family lived in with Peter Lester and paid the taxes on the home. She and her husband opened another clothing store which ultimately burned down in 1870. At the time of the incident, the store was not insured which resulted in thousands of dollars in losses for Francis and her family. The store was eventually rebuilt after her husband's death in 1872. At that point the store and other businesses were put solely in her name, as well as the debt that her husband had acquired while alive. In order to pay off these debts, Francis was forced to sell some their residential property, including their home back in New York. At the time of her death in 1889, Francis had a net worth of only $200 (~$7,167 in 2025) and had been working as a house keeper. Francis is buried in Ross Bay Cemetery in Victoria, Capital Regional District, British Columbia, Canada.
