= Thomas Marcus Decatur Ward =

American A.M.E. Bishop (1823–1894)

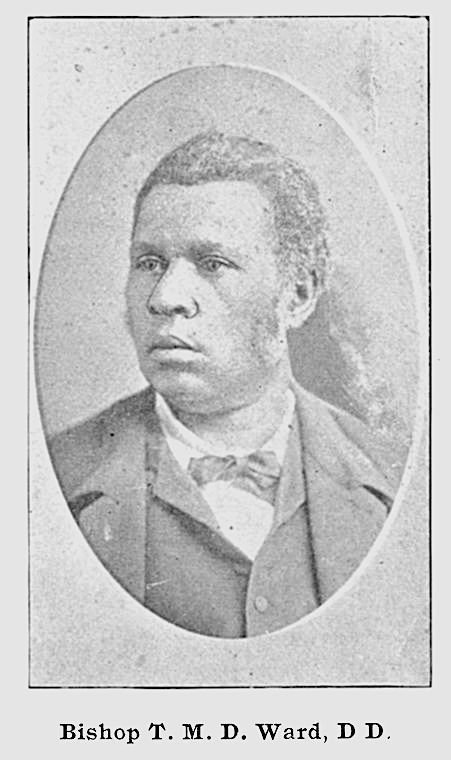
- T. M. D. Ward (1902)
- Born: September 28, 1823; Hanover, Pennsylvania, U.S.
- Died: June 1894 (aged 70); Jacksonville, Florida, U.S.
- Other names: Thomas Mayers Decatur Ward
- Occupations: Bishop, missionary, minister, abolitionist
- Known for: 10th Bishop and an early representative of the A.M.E. church on the Pacific Coast

Rev. Thomas Marcus Decatur Ward (September 28, 1823 – June 1894) was an American preacher, missionary, bishop, and abolitionist who aided African-Americans escaping slavery. Ward is considered to have been a central leader of African American religious activity in the 19th century and has been referred to as “the original trailblazer of African Methodism” in the United States. In 1854, Ward took over leadership of St. Cyprian's African Methodist Episcopal Church in San Francisco. He was an early representative of the A.M.E. church on the Pacific Coast, and he also served as the 10th Bishop of the A.M.E. Church starting in 1868. Ward often went by the name T. M. D. Ward, but was also known as Thomas Mayers Decatur Ward.

== Childhood and early life ==
Ward was born September 28, 1823, in Hanover, Pennsylvania. His parents and grandparents were African American and had escaped from slavery and moved to Pennsylvania, where they became active in the Underground Railroad. His uncle was Samuel Ringgold Ward.

Ward grew up in Philadelphia, where he joined the A.M.E church in 1838 at age 15.

== Start of church career ==
At age 20, he received his license to preach and joined the New England Conference in 1846. Ward became a church elder in 1849.

Ward soon became a member of the AME church hierarchy in Pennsylvania. He was then elected secretary of the New England Conference for the territories within the national church. During this conference, Ward broached the idea of a "California mission". The church sent him to San Francisco to accomplish it.

== San Francisco mission ==
When Ward arrived in San Francisco, he found the AME church to be very small and impoverished. He was forced to find outside work to survive. He lived in a small complex on 532 Bush Lane. Soon after his arrival, the church was attacked by an arsonist in 1854.

From 1854 until 1856, Ward worked as a Sunday School teacher and pastor at Saint Andrews African Methodist Episcopal Church in Sacramento. In 1855 and later years, Ward was an active participant in the annual California State Convention of Colored Citizens, including hosting the event at his church in 1857.

Ward became involved in the campaign to Archy Lee. In 1857, Lee had been transported from Mississippi to Sacramento. In 1867, Ward helped raise US $50,000 for legal costs of three trials that eventually emancipated Lee. Ward later spent US $3,050 to stop Lee's former owner from kidnapping him back to Mississippi.

After the beginning of the American Civil War, Ward was president of the California Contraband Relief Association and provided funds for the care of the freedmen. In the mid 1860s Ward was elected as Bishop to the Pacific Coast at the church's annual conference. Ward acted as a delegate to and was also the chair of the education committee of the California State Convention of the Colored Citizens.

== Georgia and later life ==
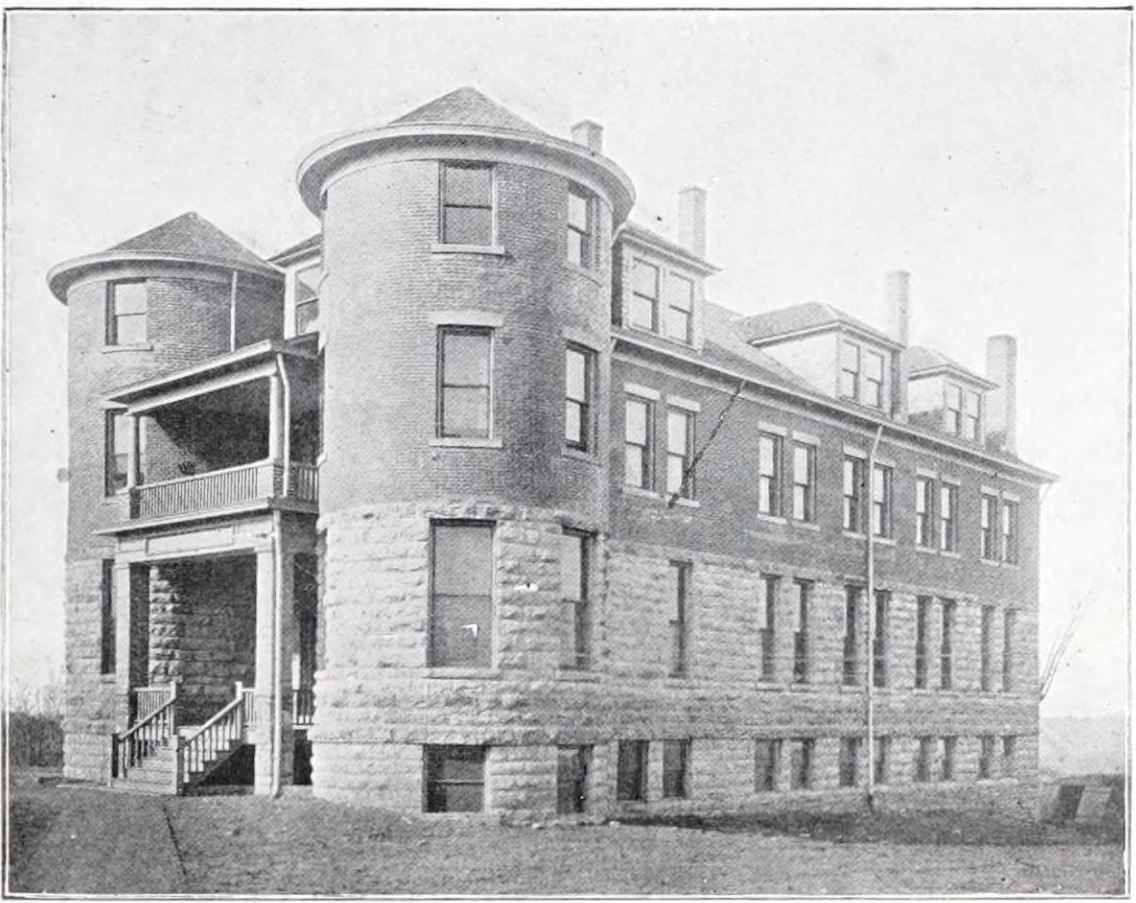
Ward Hall (c. 1910), Freedmen University (now Western University of Kansas)

In his later years, Ward returned frequently to the Northeastern United States to preach He was finally reassigned to the fifth district of the church in Georgia. In Georgia, he presided over numerous general conferences that were held there. In 1875, the church invited white Americans to the conference for the first time.

In one of his sermons, Ward preached of the importance of education and stated, "Encourage learning and you will live; despise it and you will die".

Ward was often described as "old man eloquent". Another common description made by his colleagues was that he was an overweight man who charmed his audiences with a resonate voice and was a man of courage.

In the late 1870s, Freedmen University (later Western University) was founded and one of the halls was named Ward Hall after him for his work with African-American youth.

Ward was involved in the early 1880s with the founding of Bishop Ward Normal and Collegiate Institute in Huntsville, Texas. In 1886, Ward created a coalition of religious figures dedicated to the study of learning.

In June 1894, Ward died in Jacksonville, Florida, and he was buried in Washington, D.C.
