= India Hamilton =

African-American educator

India Hamilton

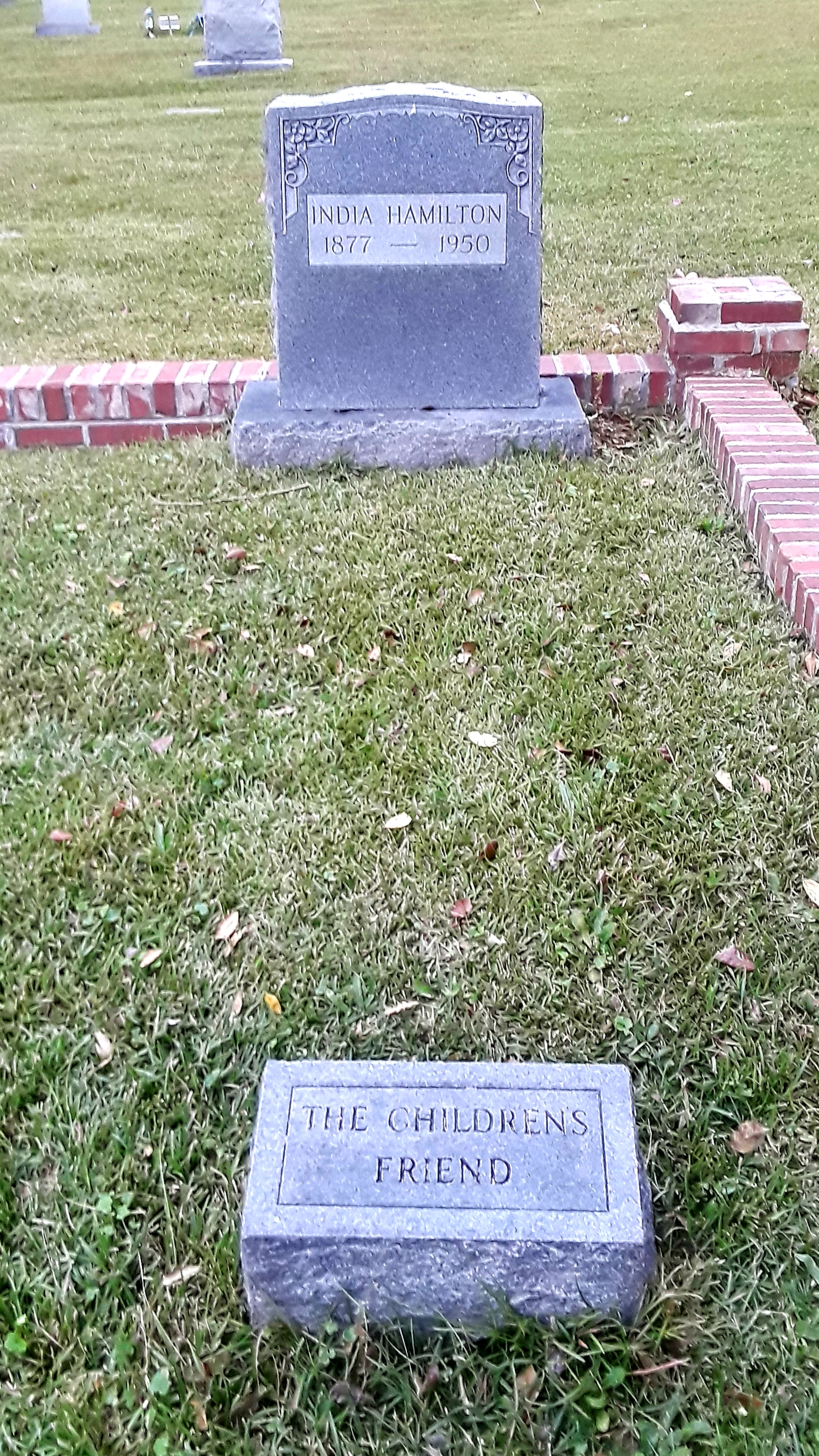
India Hamilton's grave, with footstone identifying her as "The Children's Friend"

India Hamilton (c. 1879 – April 18, 1950) was an African-American educator.

== Biography ==
A native of King and Queen County, Virginia, Hamilton was born into poverty, the daughter of former slaves. She was a graduate of Howard University. In 1913 she began her teaching career in King William County, Virginia, where she worked in a segregated two-room school. For close to twenty years she was the Jeanes Fund supervisor for the county; in this role, she aided the community in raising money for improvements to schools and new construction, including the King William Training School. She pushed for longer school terms, and developed the idea of an annual Exhibit Day at which the work of the county's African-American students could be presented. Outside of her county duties, Hamilton chaired the Better Schools Program of the Negro Organization Society of Virginia at Hampton Institute and served on the executive committee of the Virginia State Teachers Association. An advocate for collaboration between teachers and nearby colleges, she promoted a variety of improvement projects over the years. During her career she earned the title of "the children's friend". Hamilton is interred in the graveyard of the Third Union Baptist Church in King William County.

Hamilton was honored by King William County in 1952 when she became the namesake, with Samuel B. Holmes, of Hamilton-Holmes High School; more recently the county has named a middle school after them both. The Negro Organization Society named its camp on the York River the India Hamilton Camp. In 2019, Hamilton was recognized by the Library of Virginia by being named one of its Virginia Women in History. Hers is among the names inscribed on the Wall of Honor at the Virginia Women's Monument.
