= Saint Andrews African Methodist Episcopal Church (Sacramento, California) =

Historical church in California, US

St. Andrews A.M.E. Church
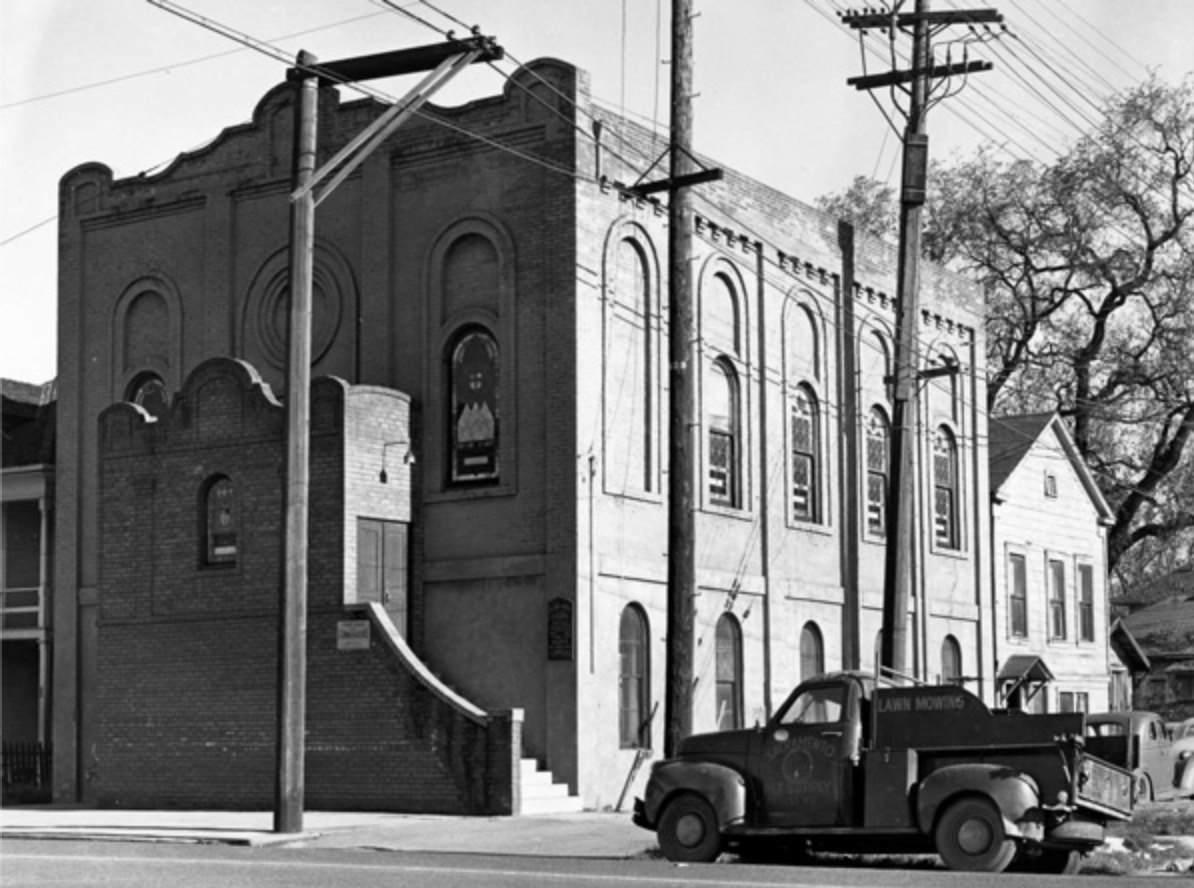
- St. Andrews A.M.E. Church, c. 1926
- Interactive map of St. Andrews A.M.E. Church
- Location: 2131 Eighth Street, Sacramento, Sacramento County, California, U.S.
- Coordinates: 38.584217°N 121.496033°W
- Founded: 1850

California Historical Landmark
- Designated: May 5, 1994
- Reference no.: 1013
- Plaque location: 715 Seventh Street, Sacramento, Sacramento County, California, U.S.
- Founder: Daniel Blue

The Saint Andrews African Methodist Episcopal Church is an African Methodist Episcopal Church in Sacramento, California, founded in 1850. It was the first African American church in California and the first AME Church on the West Coast of the United States. It was originally located at 715 Seventh Street, which is marked by a historical plaque. This church is still active, and is presently located at 2131 Eighth Street in Sacramento. It is listed as a California Historical Landmark (number 1013) since May 5, 1994. It was formerly known as the Colored Methodist Episcopal Church and the Bethel African Methodist Episcopal Church.

== History ==
The congregation was founded in 1850 and a year later it was admitted into the African Methodist Episcopal Church, becoming the first on the West Coast. It was initially known as the Colored Methodist Episcopal Church and when it became part of the AME the name was changed to Bethel African Methodist Episcopal Church. During 1850, California became an official state; and the California Gold Rush had recently started two years earlier. Many African Americans were working in the gold mining areas near Sacramento, some in search of their own wealth, and freedom as gold miners, and others working under Southern gold miners.

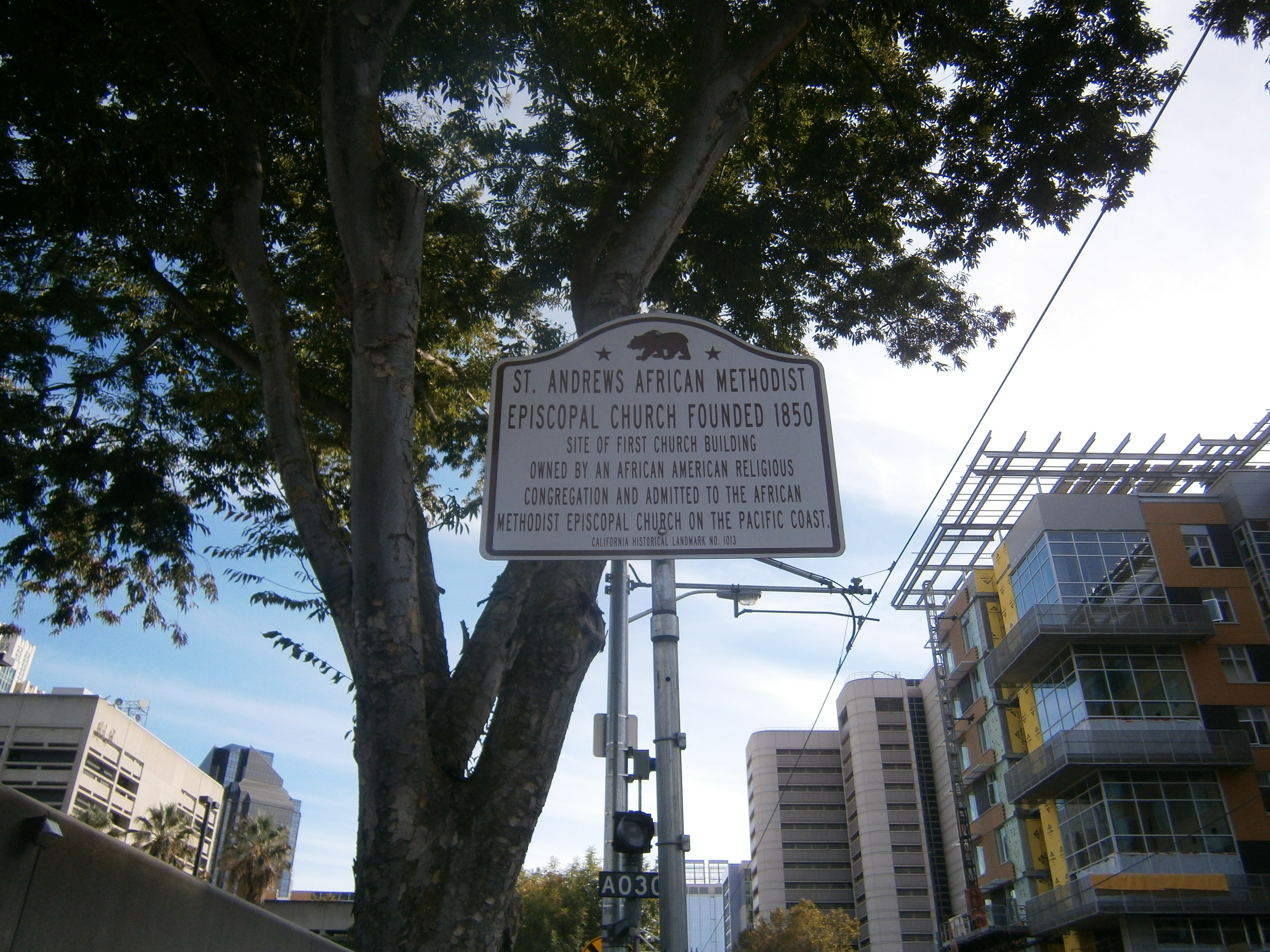
Historic plaque at 715 Seventh Street, Sacramento

Daniel Blue (1796–1884), had founded the church. Blue was formerly enslaved in Kentucky, and had made his fortunes in gold mining in California; and Blue had held his first church service in his own basement. Some of the earliest congregation included Mary Robinson Thames, and Ethel Guinn. The first pastor was Barney Fletcher, however he wasn't officially ordained. Other early pastors included Rev. James Fitzgerald from 1851 to 1852; Rev. A. Giles from 1852 to 1854; Rev. George Fletcher from 1853 to 1854; and Rev. Darius Stokes from 1854 to 1856. Thomas Marcus Decatur Ward had worked as briefly as the first Sunday School teacher and as a pastor. In 1854, Elizabeth Thorn Scott Flood had started an early African American school at her home with the help of this church.

The Saint Andrews African Methodist Episcopal Church had served as a community meeting place. In November 1855, the church was the site of the first California State Convention of Colored Citizens, and the following conventions in 1856, and 1865.

== See also ==
- California Historical Landmarks in Sacramento County
- African Americans in California
