= 1865 South Carolina State Convention of Colored People =

The 1865 South Carolina State Convention of Colored People was a statewide meeting of African American civil rights activists after emancipation and the end of the Civil War. The convention took place November 20—25, 1865, at the Zion Church in Charleston, South Carolina. Delegates discussed various reforms and adopted three documents by the end of the convention, including the "Address of the State Convention," the "Declaration of Rights and Wrongs," and the "Memorial to Congress."

== Organizing the convention ==
=== Colored people's conventions ===
At the time, various conventions were held across Southern states in order to arrange elections and prepare for political reintegration back into the Union. However, none of these conventions included African American representatives, so in an effort to make their voices heard, African Americans held their own "colored people conventions."

At the 1865 South Carolina Convention, 52 African American delegates from throughout the state gathered to discuss various issues and potential reforms that could take place in the state. In addition, the state committee published a letter, the "Address of the State Convention," to the white population of South Carolina, highlighting their concerns that African Americans had not been included in the conversation over political integration. They demanded that African Americans had the same rights as any other American.

=== Convention leadership ===
President Thomas M. Holmes led the convention, while Jacob Mills, J.J. Wright, W.M. Simmons served as vice presidents. Alongside forming a state central committee, individual committees were also appointed for financial and business matters. The state central committee held the duty to advise on the general interests of colored people, and it had the ability to call a state convention of colored people whenever it felt it needed to.

== Outcomes of the convention ==
African Americans discussed various ideas at the convention, including the establishment of good schools in every neighborhood throughout the state of South Carolina, as well as measures to keep school children in regular attendance. Delegates at the convention wanted to advance the interests of the people, devise a means for mutual protections, and to encourage the industrial interests of the state.

After a debate, the committee passed a resolution on the topic of maintaining good relations between former slaves and slaveholders. Some delegates had called for no malice against former slaveholders; they believed chattel slavery was a thing of the past, and African Americans should instead work to establish unity, peace, and brotherhood among all men. By the end of the convention, the committee adopted and distributed three resolutions: the "Address of the State Convention," which was sent to the people of South Carolina; the "Memorial to Congress," which was sent to the U.S Senate and House of Representatives; and the "Declaration of Rights and Wrongs."

== See also ==
- Colored Conventions Movement
- African Americans in South Carolina
