= Thomas L. Jennings =

African-American abolitionist (1791–1859)

- Born: c. 1791; New York City, U.S.
- Died: February 11, 1859 (aged 68); New York City, U.S.
- Occupations: Inventor, entrepreneur and abolitionist
- Spouse: Elizabeth
- Children: 3, inc. Elizabeth Jennings

Thomas L. Jennings (c. 1791 – February 12, 1859) was an African-American tradesman, entrepreneur, and abolitionist in New York City, New York. Jennings' business expertise, yielded a significant personal fortune, much of which he put into the abolitionist movement in the United States.

== Early life and family ==
Thomas L. Jennings was born in about 1791, to a free African-American family in New York City. He married Elizabeth, born enslaved in Delaware in 1798. Under New York's gradual abolition law of 1799, she was converted to the status of an indentured servant and was not eligible for full emancipation until 1827. (Note: The gradual abolition law freed slave children born after July 4, 1799, but only after they had served "apprenticeships" of twenty-eight years for men and twenty-five for women (far longer than traditional apprenticeships designed to teach a young person a craft), thus compensating owners for the future loss of their property."Slavery and Freedom in New York City". W. W. Norton & Company. January 1, 2015.) Elizabeth died in March 5, 1873.

Jennings and his wife had three children: Matilda Jennings Thompson (1824–1886), Elizabeth Jennings Graham ( March 1827–June 5, 1901), and James E. Jennings (1832–May 5, 1860). Matilda was a dressmaker and wife of James A. Thompson, a Mason. Elizabeth became a schoolteacher, activist, and church organist and married Charles Graham on June 18, 1860. James was a public school teacher and musician.

== Professional career ==
Thomas L. Jennings was a tailor.

== Civil rights activism and legacy ==
Jennings was a leader in the cause of abolitionism and African-American civil rights in the United States.

In 1831, Jennings was selected as assistant secretary to the First Annual Convention of the People of Color in Philadelphia, Pennsylvania, which met in June of that year.

After his daughter, Elizabeth Jennings, was forcibly removed from a "whites only" New York City streetcar in 1854, he organized a movement against racial segregation in public transit in the city. He helped arrange her legal defense, which included the young future President Chester Arthur, and won her case in 1859. Along with James McCune Smith and Rev. James W. C. Pennington, Jennings created the Legal Rights Association later in that year, a pioneering minority-rights organization. Its members organized additional challenges to discrimination and segregation and gained legal representation to take cases to court. In 1865, a decade after Elizabeth Jennings won her case, New York City streetcar companies stopped practicing segregation.

Jennings was active on issues related to emigration to other countries; opposing colonization in Africa, as proposed by the American Colonization Society; and supporting the expansion of suffrage. Jennings was a prominent figure in the fight against slavery and for civil rights for African Americans in the United States. In 1831, he was appointed as assistant secretary to the First Annual Convention of the People of Color in Philadelphia, Pennsylvania. Jennings funded and was a trustee of the Abyssinian Baptist Church, a significant institution in the Harlem African American community.

Thomas L. Jennings died in 1859 in New York City.
