= 1873 National Civil Rights Convention =

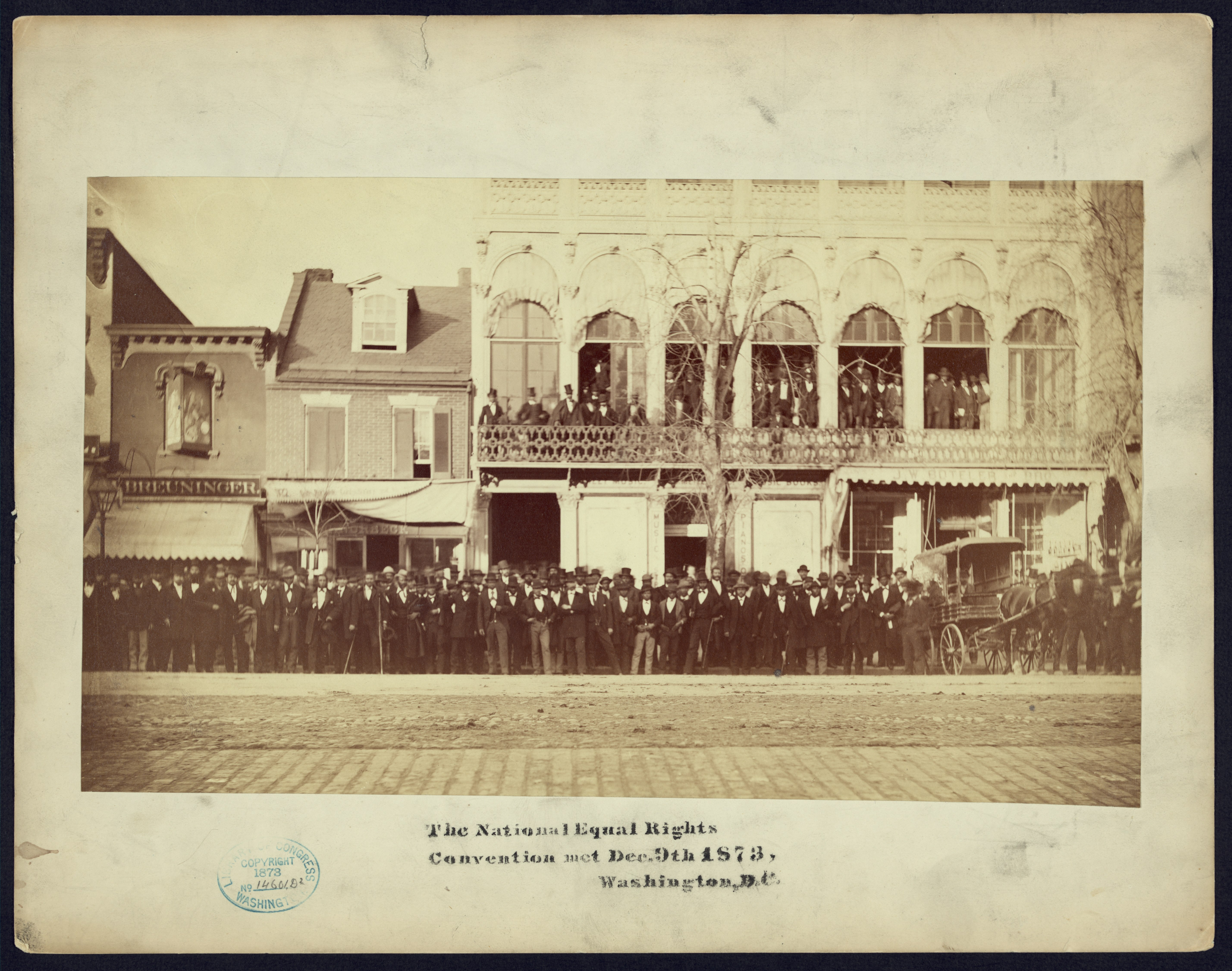
The National Equal Rights Convention, which met Dec. 9th, 1873, Washington, D.C.

The National Civil Rights Convention of 1873 was held in Washington, D.C. W. Ogilvie photographed the convention which began December 9. It was covered by the New York Times.

== History ==
The Colored Conventions Movement included a long series of national conventions held by free "people of color" going back decades before the American Civil War. Conventions were held in Philadelphia, New York City, Buffalo, Rochester (New York), Syracuse, Cleveland and (after the war) Washington D.C., St. Louis, New Orleans, and Cincinnati.

George T. Downing chaired the 1873 convention and A. M. Green was secretary. A memorial publication of the event was published.

Conventioneers were welcomed by Charles Sumner, supported by members of the Republican party and President Ulysses Grant.

William Nesbit called the meeting to order. Attendees included John Mercer Langston, P. B. S. Pinchback, Stuart Ellison, Robert Harlan, Daniel Straker, John Hyman, Frederick Douglass, and all seven African American congressmen. President Grant received attendees at the White House's Blue Room.

== See also ==
- Civil Rights Act of 1875
