= Martha S. Jones =

American legal historian

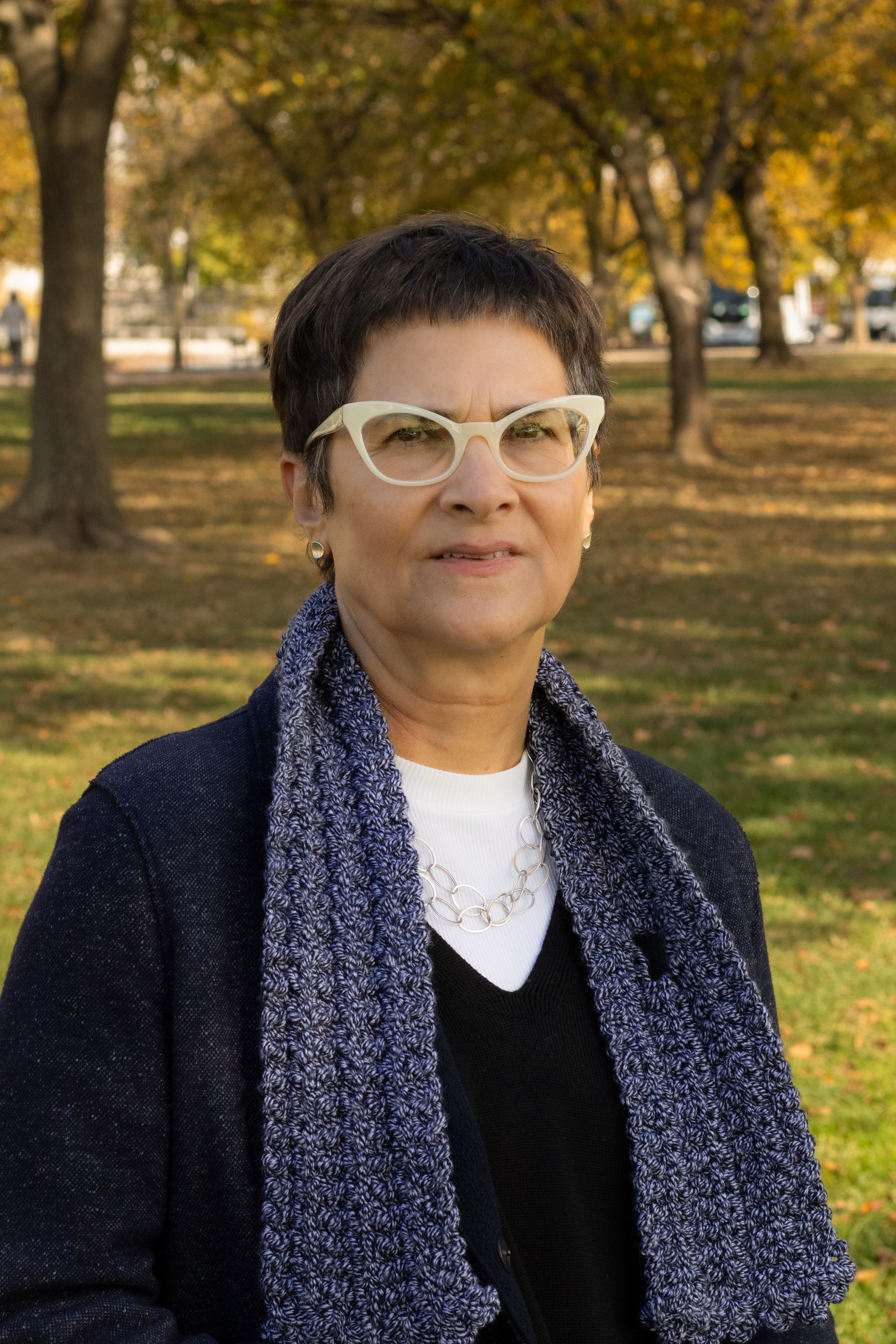
- Born: New York, New York

Academic background
- Education: Hunter College; CUNY School of Law; Columbia University
- Doctoral advisor: Eric Foner

Academic work
- Discipline: History; Law
- Institutions: Eugene Lang College of Liberal Arts; University of Michigan; Johns Hopkins University
- Website: http://marthasjones.com/

Martha S. Jones is an American historian and legal scholar. She is the Society of Black Alumni Presidential Professor and Professor of History at Johns Hopkins University. She studies the legal and cultural history of the United States, with a particular focus on how Black Americans have shaped the history of American democracy. She has published books on the voting rights of African American women, the debates about women's rights among Black Americans in the early United States, and the development of birthright citizenship in the United States as promoted by African Americans in Baltimore before the Civil War.

== Early life and education ==
Jones’s mother, Sue Jones, was born to German and Irish immigrants in Buffalo, New York. Jones’s father was born in Greensboro, North Carolina. Her paternal grandfather, David Dallas Jones, was the president of the Bennett College, a historically black college and one of only two all-women HBCUs in the United States. Jones attended Hunter College, where she graduated with a BA degree in 1984. She then attended the CUNY School of Law, earning a JD in 1987.

== Legal career ==
From 1987 to 1994, Jones was a public interest lawyer with MFY Legal Services and the HIV Law Project. In 1994, she was awarded a Charles H. Revson Fellowship on the Future of the City of New York at Columbia University.

== Academic career ==
Jones then became a graduate student at Columbia University, and obtained an MA in history in 1997, an MPhil in history in 1998, and a PhD in history in 2001. During her graduate studies, Jones was an adjunct lecturer at Eugene Lang College of Liberal Arts at The New School, and a visiting professor of history at Barnard College. In 2001, she joined the faculty of History and Afroamerican and African Studies at the University of Michigan, where she was an Arthur F. Thurnau Professor from 2013 to 2017, and a Presidential Bicentennial Professor from 2016 to 2017. From 2004 to 2017 she was also affiliated with the University of Michigan Law School.

In 2017, Jones joined the faculty at The Johns Hopkins University, becoming the Society of Black Alumni Presidential Professor and Professor of History.

Jones has held visiting positions, including at the School for Advanced Studies in the Social Sciences in Paris, and the University of Pennsylvania Law School. She has held fellowships from the American Council of Learned Societies, the National Humanities Center, Library Company of Philadelphia, and the National Constitution Center. She is a distinguished lecturer of the Organization of American Historians.

In 2018 Jones was elected a Fellow of the American Antiquarian Society. In 2017, she became a co-president of the Berkshire Conference of Women Historians, and serves on the board of governors for the William L. Clements Library.

== Research ==
In 2007, Jones published All Bound Up Together: The Woman Question in African American Public Culture, 1830–1900. In it, she discusses the woman question in the debate over women's rights in African-American public culture during the early 1800s. Jones presents evidence that contradicts the dominant narrative that the women's rights movement in America began with the Seneca Falls Convention in 1848, instead showing that African-American women successfully contested the right to speak before a mixed-gender audience as early as the 1830s. Jones also discusses the backlash against these activists, and the trajectory of the following generations of activists up to 1900. She shows that the American Civil War provided black women the opportunity to expand their involvement in public service activities, such as teaching and charity work, and that despite the constraints of the Reconstruction era and Jim Crow laws, many black women were able to further their positions in social and religious institutions and thereby accrue public authority.

Jones is also the author of the 2018 book Birthright Citizens: A History of Race and Rights in Antebellum America. Jones explains the development of Birthright citizenship in the United States using both legal and extra-legal claims by African Americans in the city of Baltimore. She argues that the development of birthright citizenship for African Americans was not an automatic consequence of the Fourteenth Amendment to the United States Constitution or intellectual activity and activism that followed the Dred Scott v. Sandford decision, but was mainly developed through claims that arose from everyday activity. Rather than focusing primarily on Congressional debates or judicial decisions, Jones traces how free black people in Baltimore gradually inhabited the role of citizens by engaging with the legal system to claim opportunities like travel permits, debt relief, gun licenses, control over property, lawsuits, and contract-making. Jones uses evidence mainly from the 1790s through the adoption of the Fourteenth Amendment in 1868, and although she focuses primarily on Baltimore, she also incorporates evidence from throughout the United States during that period. Jones also studies the activities of the Legal Rights Association, the politics of colonization and how state-level petitions and legislative activism by African Americans rendered the Dred Scott decision less effective over time. In the same year that Birthright Citizens was published, Donald Trump suggested that he would end birthright citizenship in the United States by executive order, so the book was noted for studying a timely subject with particular implications for the status of unauthorized immigrants to the United States.

In 2020, Jones published Vanguard: How Black Women Broke Barriers, Won the Vote and Insisted on Equality for All. On March 4, 2025, Jones's book The Trouble of Color: An American Family Memoir was released.

Jones also co-edited the 2015 volume Toward an Intellectual History of Black Women.

== Honors ==
- 2013–14: National Humanities Center William C. and Ida Friday Fellow
- 2019: American Society for Legal History John Phillip Reid Book Award
- 2019: American Historical Association Littleton-Griswold Prize for Birthright Citizens
- 2019: Organization of American Historians Liberty Legacy Foundation Award for Birthright Citizens
- 2020: Los Angeles Times History Book Prize for Vanguard

== Creative work ==
Jones has curated museum exhibitions, including "Reframing the Color Line" and "Proclaiming Emancipation" in conjunction with the William L. Clements Library.

== Selected works ==
- "'Make us a Power': African-American Methodists Debate the Rights of Women, 1870–1900" in Women and Religion in the African Diaspora (2006)
- "Leave of Court: African-American Legal Claims Making In the Era of Dred Scott v. Sandford" in Sinha, Manisha and Von Eschen, Penny M. Contested Democracy: Freedom, Race, and Power in American History (2007) ISBN 9780231141109
- All Bound Up Together: The Woman Question in African American Public Culture, 1830–1900 (2007) ISBN 979-88-9313-262-5
- "Overthrowing the 'Monopoly of the Pulpit': Race and the Rights of Churchwomen in Nineteenth Century America" in Hewitt, Nancy A., No Permanent Waves: Recasting Histories of U.S. Feminism (2010) ISBN 9780813547251
- "Time, Space, and Jurisdiction in Atlantic World Slavery: The Volunbrun Household in Gradual Emancipation New York" in Law and History Review 29, no. 4 (2011), doi:10.1017/S0738248011000575
- "The Case of Jean Baptiste, un Créole de Saint-Domingue: Narrating Slavery, Freedom, and the Haitian Revolution in Baltimore City," in The American South and the Atlantic World (2013)
- "Emancipation's Encounters: Seeing the Proclamation Through Soldiers' Sketchbooks". Journal of the Civil War Era vol. 3, no. 4 (December 2013) doi:10.1353/cwe.2013.0076
- "History and Commemoration: The Emancipation Proclamation at 150". Journal of the Civil War Era, 3, no. 4 (December 2013) doi:10.1353/cwe.2013.0089
- Toward an Intellectual History of Black Women (2015) ISBN 979-88-908471-3-3
- "First the Streets, Then the Archives". American Journal of Legal History 56, no. 1 (March 2016) doi:10.1093/ajlh/njv027
- "Forgetting the Abolition of the Slave Trade in the United States: How History Troubled Memory in 2008" in Distant Ripples of the British Abolitionist Wave: Africa, Asia, and the Americas (2017) ISBN 9781569025505
- Birthright Citizens: A History of Race and Rights in Antebellum America (2018) ISBN 9781107150348
- "How the Daughters and Granddaughters of Former Slaves Secured Voting Rights for All". Smithsonian Magazine (March 8, 2019)
- Vanguard: How Black Women Broke Barriers, Won the Vote, and Insisted on Equality for All (2020)
- The Trouble of Color: An American Family Memoir (2025)
