= Atlanta Sociological Laboratory =

The Atlanta Sociological Laboratory was founded in 1895-96 at Clark Atlanta University in Atlanta, Georgia.

== History ==
In July 1895, President Horace Bumstead of Atlanta University proposed a plan to the board of trustees to conduct yearly studies on the transition of Negroes from their time in slavery to their transition into freedom. The findings and research was to be presented at conferences that were to be held yearly entitled Atlanta Conferences. Bradford's and Bumstead's original plan was to hold conferences and present general social problems faced by African Americans in major cities. Bradford and Bumstead got the idea to hold conferences from other institutions such as Hampton University and Tuskegee University. According to president Bumstead,“We are simply to study human life under certain conditions- conditions which, if repeated with any other race, would have practically the same result”.

He considered that the employments of city Negroes are different from those of their rural brethren, agriculture being replaced by trade, or the various form of personal service, and to some extent by mercantile and professional pursuits. Their social life is also different”. Another reason Bumstead wanted to study Negroes was because he thought that their problems and living conditions received little attention. He wanted to know how Negroes were able to establish themselves in cities on their own and thought it was good that graduates were a part of that. Once the proposal was approved it was decided that the first study was the Mortality among Negroes in Cities. Bumstead and trustee George Bradford were in charge of the studies. During this study Bumstead and Bradford wanted to study not just the African Americans but the country as a whole including Whites.

His findings indicated that there was an alarming increase in the death of the Negro population of cities and large towns from problems of drunkenness, ignorance, poverty, and neglect. The second study conducted was the Social and Physical Condition of Negroes. It was intended to find out how and why the mortality rates of Negroes were so high. Statistical research was found and the study was executed by three colored graduate students. The findings indicate that conditions of Negroes needed to improve in order for the Negroes to have a stable life. In 1896, W. E. B. Du Bois, was offered a position to teach history and political science at Atlanta University. Du Bois had intentions when he accepted the position at Atlanta University; for example, he wanted to expand the boundaries of sociological analysis, document the Negroes, and assist in training fellow black intellectual elites at Atlanta University. It was important to Du Bois that blacks becomes elites and help their communities because it was better for the advancement of the race if Negroes were educated. Du Bois accepted the position and started in 1897.

Du Bois was considered for the position because of his own independent studies of Negroes in the US. Before he arrived, two studies were already conducted under the direction of Bumstead and Bradford. Du Bois thought that the way in which the studies were conducted had room to improve. Du Bois officially arrived in 1897 and immediately wanted to take charge of the studies of Negroes as well. He wanted to take charge of the studies because he felt that they were not gathering and using the data correctly. He indicated that, “as a scientific accomplishment the first conference was not important. Soon after taking charge, he developed a new plan and indicated, “When I took charge of the Atlanta Conference, I did not pause to consider how far my developed plans agreed or disagreed with the ideas of the already launched project". It made an essential difference, since only one conference been held and the second planned.

Du Bois' original plan for the Atlanta Conferences was to present a single African-American issue each year and not combine general findings yearly. Du Bois planned to create a program that lasted for 100 (look at to get specifics on how he planned studies) years worth of studies in 10-year increments. Du Bois began conducting studies and presented them yearly at the Atlanta Conferences.

Du Bois believe that social problems among Negroes would be better understood by approaching the studies inductively. Methods in which were used to collect the data was the systematic method triangulation (social science). Methodical triangulation (social science) was the method executed to create more precise social facts by using multiple forms and sources of data. Du Bois, students and colleagues used participant observation, surveyed individuals, historical research, and census data to get more accurate results.

The Atlanta Sociological Laboratory was the first university department to exercise method and theory triangulation, and the first to use insider researchers. As time went on, Du Bois made sure he increased the awareness of the conditions in which Negroes endured. He also noticed that his findings of Negro studies was starting to impact the nation in a positive way. According to Du Bois, “. . . the kindergarten system of the city of Atlanta, white as well as black; the Negro Business League, and various projects to better health and combat crime” were all inspired by Du Bois's work.

Du Bois continued to work with the Atlanta Sociological Laboratory for 13 years and resigned in 1910, but remained a director of Atlanta Conference publication until 1914. After Du Bois left Atlanta University, he was still a very active participant in the Atlanta conferences until the final publication in 1917. 1924 was the last year of the Atlanta Conferences. Du Bois reasons for resigning included lack of advertising on his behalf, “Either I myself or someone for me should have called public attention to what had been done or otherwise it would quickly forgotten. Indeed the philosophy then current and afterwards triumphant was that the Deed without Advertising was worthless and in the long run Advertising without the Deed was the only lasting value”. Du Bois faced great adversary while conducting the Negro studies that lead to his resignation, for example funding became an issue because of there was a lack of support that came from the state of Georgia to Atlanta University. There became a lack of support for Negro studies because Atlanta University was refusing to accept funds from the state of Georgia in exchange that they end the Negro studies.

Because Atlanta University did not accept funds, it led to the deterioration of the Atlanta Conferences of which the last publication was in 1917. “According to Du Bois, had Atlanta University accepted funding from the state of Georgia it would have been forced to succumb to the racial intolerance that contradicted the original charter of the university, but the school would not have experienced the level of financial crisis it was later troubled by. Because of the racial tensions in the South during the time in which Du Bois lived, it was hard to get information about minorities without disrupting Jim Crow laws.

Of the lesser known members who made important contributions to the Atlanta Sociological Laboratory, Monroe Nathan Work, a graduate from the University of Chicago department of Sociology, whose work was influenced by Du Bois’s studies at Atlanta University that he began working with the Atlanta Sociological Laboratory conducting research and having it appear in Atlanta University Publications. Work’s contributions to the Atlanta University Publications include reports on religion and crime that were published in the 1903 and 1904 monographs and a 1917 offering on economic cooperation”.

Lucy Craft Laney graduated from Atlanta University in 1873. After Laney graduated from Atlanta University, she became a teacher and opened up her own school in 1886. She opened her own school to teach Negroes based on the curriculum on literature, social sciences and the classics. Laney and Du Bois agreed that Blacks should obtain liberal arts education against Booker T. Washington's advocacy for vocational education. Laney was known to have participated in at least five Atlanta Conferences.

Quotes by Du Bois include “So far as the American world of science and letters as concerned, we never “belonged”; we remained unrecognized in learned societies and academic groups. We rated merely as Negroes studying Negroes, and after all, what had Negroes to do with America or science. “We are simply to study human life under certain conditions- conditions which, if repeated with any other race, would have practically the same result”.

== List of Negro studies ==
- 1. 1896, Mortality Among Negroes in Cities
- 2. 1897, Social and Physical Condition of Negroes in Cities
- 3. 1898, Some Efforts of Negroes for Social Betterment
- 4. 1899, The Negro in Business
- 5. 1900, The College-Bred Negro
- 6. 1901, The Negro Common School
- 7. 1902, The Negro Artisan
- 8. 1903, The Negro Church
- 9. 1904, Notes on Negro Crime
- 10. 1905, A Select Bibliography of the American Negro
- 11. 1906, The Health and Physique of the American Negro
- 12. 1907, The Economic Co-operation among Negro Americans
- 13. 1908, The Negro American Family
- 14. 1909, Efforts for Social Betterment among Negro Americans
- 15. 1910, The College-Bred Negro American
- 16. 1911, The Common School and the Negro American
- 17. 1912, The Negro American Artisan
- 18. 1914, The Morals and Manners among Negro Americans
- 19. 1916, Select Discussions of Race Problems
- 20. 1917 Economic Co-operation among the Negroes of Georgia
- 21. 1941, The First Phylon Institute
