= James W. C. Pennington =

American abolitionist and writer (c. 1807–1870)

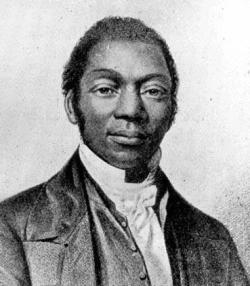
- Born: c. 1807; Eastern Shore of Maryland
- Died: October 22, 1870 (aged 62–63); Jacksonville, Florida
- Education: Yale University
- Movement: Abolitionism in the United States

James William Charles Pennington (c. 1807 – October 22, 1870) was an American historian, abolitionist, orator, minister, writer, and social organizer. Pennington is the first Black student known to have attended Yale University. He was ordained as a minister in the Congregational Church, later also serving in Presbyterian churches for congregations in Hartford, Connecticut, and New York. After the Civil War, he served congregations in Natchez, Mississippi, Portland, Maine, and Jacksonville, Florida.

In the Antebellum period, Pennington was an abolitionist, and among the American delegates to the Second World Conference on Slavery in London in 1843. In 1850, he happened to be in Scotland when the Fugitive Slave Act was passed by the US Congress. As it increased the risk for fugitive slaves in the North, Pennington stayed in the British Isles while friends worked to buy his freedom from his former master and then from his estate. Pennington raised funds for the abolition movement on the public lecture circuit in England.

Pennington wrote and published what is considered the first history of blacks in the United States, The Origin and History of the Colored People (1841). His memoir, The Fugitive Blacksmith, was first published in 1849 in London.

On April 24, 2023, Yale awarded Pennington a posthumous M.A. Privatim degree

== Early life ==
James was born into slavery in 1807, at a Tilghman plantation on the Eastern Shore of Maryland. When he was four years old, James and his mother were given to Frisby Tilghman, their master's son, as a wedding gift. They were taken by the younger Tilghman to his new plantation called Rockland Farm, near Hagerstown in western Maryland. There James was trained as a carpenter and blacksmith. On October 28, 1827, at the age of nineteen, James escaped from the plantation, leaving behind his parents and eleven siblings.

Pennington reached Adams County, Pennsylvania, where he was taken in by the Quakers William and Phoebe Wright. They assisted the fugitive from slavery, and paid him wages for his work. As Pennington was illiterate, Wright began to teach him to read and write. Pennington adopted the middle name "William" after his benefactor, and the surname "Pennington," after Isaac Penington, an English man who was prominent in Quaker history.

== Move to New York ==
Moving north to Brooklyn, New York, a year later in 1828, Pennington found work as a coachman for a wealthy lawyer. He continued his education, paying tutors out of his earnings, and teaching himself Latin and Greek. New York's law for gradual abolition of slavery did not completely free all adults until 1827. In the early 1800s Kings County and Brooklyn on Long Island still had many enslaved laborers, as they were important to the agricultural economy of the area at the time.

Pennington attended the first Negro National Convention in Philadelphia in 1829. He continued to be active in the Negro Convention Movement, becoming its presiding officer in 1853. Within five years he had learned so much that he was hired to teach school in Newtown (present-day Elmhurst, Queens, in western Long Island). In Newtown, on September 12, 1838, Pennington married Frederick Douglass and Anna Murray.

He also became involved in the Shiloh Presbyterian Church, Manhattan.

== Education ==
Pennington applied to Yale Divinity School but was denied admission due to the color of his skin. Yale administrators allowed Pennington to take classes at Yale University without formally matriculating, but under degrading conditions. He was not allowed to speak or ask a question in class, borrow a book from the library, or add his name to the Yale catalog, humiliations that he called "oppression." After completing his studies at Yale Divinity School, Pennington was ordained to the ministry of the Congregational Church, suggesting that the church recognized he had received a Yale education.

On April 24, 2023, Yale awarded Pennington a M.A. Privatim, acknowledging, "Although we cannot return to Pennington...the access and privileges [he was] denied when [he] studied at Yale, we recognize [his] work and honor [his legacy] by conferring on [him a] M.A. Privatim degree."

== Ministry and social justice work ==
Pennington first served a congregation on Long Island, probably in Queens. Next Pennington was called in 1840 by the Talcott Street Church (now called Faith Congregational Church) in Hartford, Connecticut. While serving as minister, Pennington wrote what is believed to be the first history of African Americans, The Origin and History of the Colored People (1841), drawing on current works of the time. In this work, Pennington expressed anti-Catholic sentiments and claimed that supposedly Biblical justification for slavery had roots in "a doctrine first invented by a bishop of the Romish church".

He became deeply involved in the abolition movement. He was selected as a delegate to the Second World Conference on Slavery in London. While in England, he had been invited by churches to preach and serve communion as a matter of course as a visiting minister. After returning to Hartford, he told his white colleagues about this and persuaded them to include him in their pulpit exchanges. On this circuit, he was the first black pastor to preach in a number of Connecticut churches.

He became friends with John Hooker, one of his parishioners, confiding in him in 1844 his status as a fugitive slave and concern about his future. Hooker opened secret negotiations for purchase with his former owner, Frisby Tilghman. Hooker and Pennington did not then have the $500 demanded by the master, who died soon after.

Pennington was among those in the late 1830s who became involved in seeking justice for some West African Mende people illegally taken in slavery. After they mutinied and sailed their ship to Long Island, they were taken into custody by the United States. Spain, the ship's owners, the US, and the Mende, all had roles in the complex Amistad case, which was litigated from 1839 to 1841. The courts were called on to determine whether the Mende were the property of the ship's owners, or of Spain, or free. It was ultimately settled by the United States Supreme Court, which ruled in favor of the Mende, saying that as free men (since the African slave trade had been banned), they had the right to defend themselves and try to regain their freedom. When the West Africans won their case and freedom, thirty-five chose to return to Africa. Pennington formed the United Missionary Society, the first black missionary society, to help raise funds for their return.

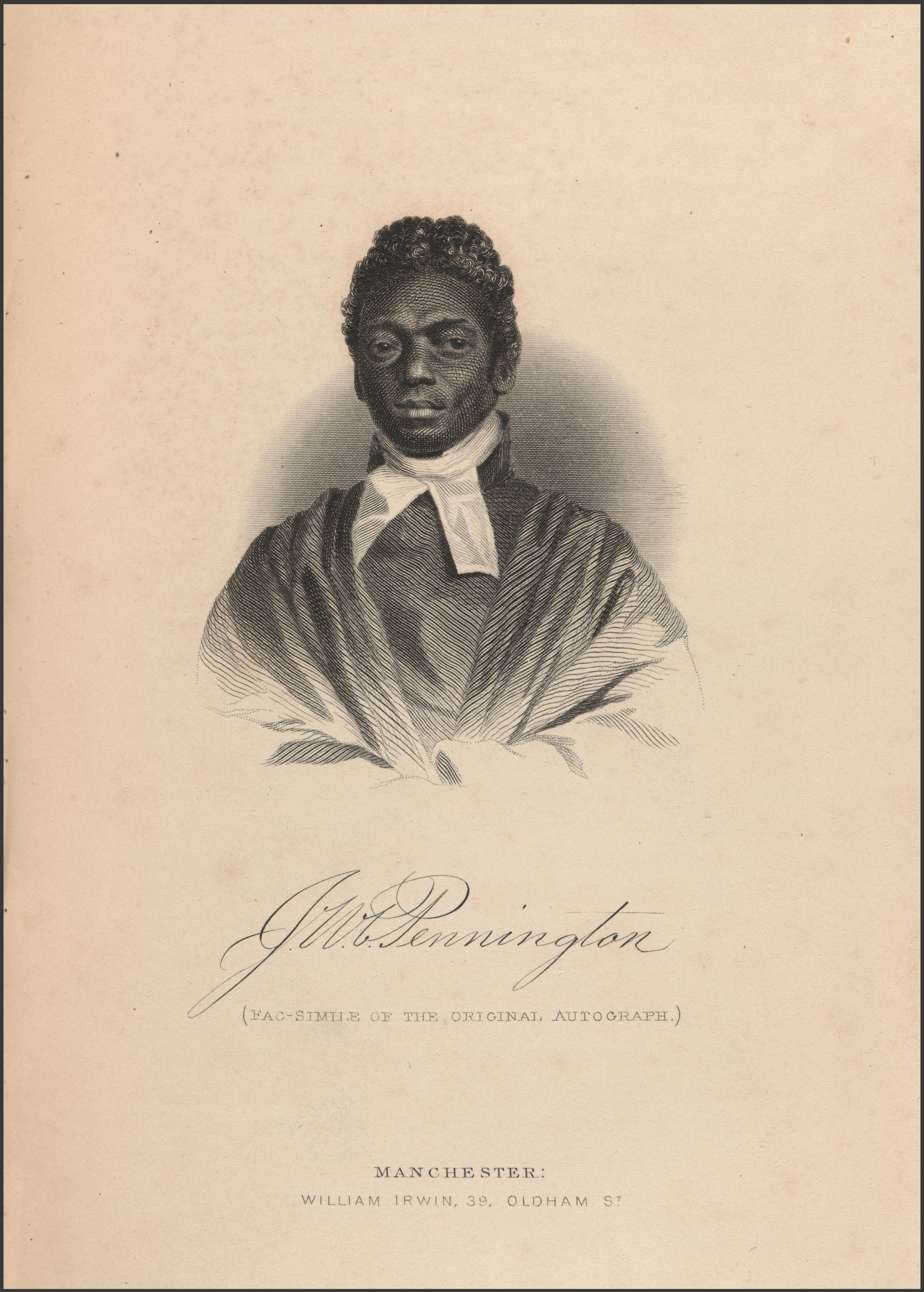
Portrait of James W.C. Pennington (1984)

Pennington happened to be in Scotland when the Fugitive Slave Law of 1850 was passed, which increased the risk to him as a fugitive from the South. It required even law enforcement and officials in such free states as New York to cooperate in the capture and prosecution of fugitive slaves, and was biased in favor of slave catchers and masters. Bounties were offered for slaves' capture and documentation requirements were light, making it easy for slave catchers even to take free persons. Although Pennington was called to New York in 1850 to serve the Shiloh Presbyterian Church, he feared returning while at such risk. Hooker worked with abolitionists in England to raise money to purchase Pennington from Tilghman's estate (the planter had died). Friends of Pennington in Dunse, Berwickshire raised the funds. Hooker briefly took legal "ownership" of Pennington in order to legally manumit him in New York.

While remaining in the British Isles for nearly two years for his safety, Pennington traveled widely there and in Europe, speaking and raising money for the abolition cause. He had completed writing his memoir, The Fugitive Blacksmith, which was first published in 1849 in London. This slave narrative recounted his journey from slavery to the status of educated minister. With Pennington's permission, Ottilie Assing translated major passages from The Fugitive Blacksmith into German, but the German publishing house of Carl Cotta declined to publish it.

While in Europe, Pennington was awarded an honorary doctorate by the University of Heidelberg, becoming the first African American to be so honored.

After returning to the United States, Pennington helped form a committee to protest the segregation of the New York City public transit system. Schoolteacher Elizabeth Jennings had been arrested in 1854 for using a street car reserved for whites. Several private companies operated all the street cars and required black people to sit in segregated seating. Defended by young attorney Chester A. Arthur, Jennings won her case in February 1855 in the Brooklyn Circuit Court, after a three-day trial covered by The New York Times.

In June 1855, Pennington was arrested for boarding "a horse-drawn car of the South Avenue Railroad in violation of the company's segregation policy". Frederick Douglass wrote an article on Pennington's case. Pennington was convicted in 1859 after being represented by the Legal Rights Association. It had been formed by Elizabeth's father Thomas L. Jennings. He challenged the system successfully and on appeal, gained an 1855 ruling by the State Supreme Court that such racial segregation was illegal and must end. By 1865, after starts and stops, all the street car companies had desegregated their systems.

== Civil War and after ==
Pennington identified as a pacifist, but during the American Civil War (1861–1865), he helped recruit black troops for the Union Army. When the war was over, he served for a short time as a minister in Natchez, Mississippi. Next he was called to Portland, Maine, where he served for three years.

Early in 1870, he returned to the South, where he had been appointed by the Presbyterian Church to serve in Florida. He organized an African-American congregation in Jacksonville. He died there on October 22, 1870, after a short illness.

== Legacy and honors ==
In 1849 the University of Heidelberg awarded Pennington an honorary doctorate of divinity. The university has created the James W.C. Pennington Award in his honor. It is given to scholars who have done distinguished work on topics important to Pennington. The first recipient was Albert J. Raboteau. The award has also gone to Evelyn Brooks Higginbotham, Laurie Maffly-Kipp, William L. Andrews, and Christopher Cameron.

In 2016, Yale Divinity School renamed a classroom for Pennnington and hung a portrait of him in their common room. In 2023, the Yale Graduate and Professional Student Senate passed a resolution that made Pennington an honorary senator and commissioned a portrait of Pennington to hang in their Senate center, at Gryphon's Pub.

Also in 2016, Pennington was inducted into the National Abolition Hall of Fame, in Peterboro, New York.

In 2023, Yale University conferred a posthumous M.A. Privatum on Pennington, alongside Rev. Alexander Crummell, nearly two centuries after they attended Yale. This happened in large part due to the advocacy of the Pennington Legacy Group, led by Yale Divinity School students, the Yale Graduate and Professional Student Senate, Yale Divinity Student Government, Yale College Council, and other Yale student clubs.

== Works ==
- A Text Book of the Origin and History, &c. &c. of the Colored People (1841), considered the first history of African Americans. He directly challenged published statements by former President Thomas Jefferson as to the "inferiority" of black people.
- A two years' absence, or, A farewell sermon : preached in the Fifth Congregational Church / by J. W. C. Pennington. Nov. 2d, 1845.
- The Fugitive Blacksmith, or, Events in the History of James W. C. Pennington, Pastor of a Presbyterian Church, New York, Formerly a Slave in the State of Maryland, United States (1849), his memoir, a slave narrative, was published first in London.
- The reasonableness of the abolition of slavery at the South : a legitimate inference from the success of British emancipation : an address, delivered at Hartford, Conn., on the first of August, 1856.
- A Narrative of Events of the Life of J. H. Banks, an Escaped Slave, from the Cotton State, Alabama, in America (Liverpool, 1861)
- Pennington, James W.C. (2025). The Fugitive Blacksmith and Other Essential Writings by James W.C. Pennington. Edited by Jan Stievermann, Caitlin B. Smith, and Eddie S. Glaude Jr. Oxford University Press. ISBN 978-0-19-769079-6.

== See also ==
- List of African-American abolitionists

== Bibliography ==
- Nichols, Charles. Black Men in Chains: Narratives by Escaped Slaves. New York: Hill & Wang, 1972
- Pennington, James W. C. (1849). The Fugitive Blacksmith; or, Events in the History of James W. C. Pennington, Pastor of a Presbyterian Church, New York, Formerly a Slave in the State of Maryland, United States (2nd ed.). London: Charles Gilpin., text online at Documenting the American South, University of North Carolina
- Volk, Kyle G. (2014). Moral Minorities and the Making of American Democracy. New York: Oxford University Press. pp. 148–166. ISBN 019937192X.
- Webber, Christopher L. (2011). American to the Backbone: The Life of James W.C. Pennington, the Fugitive Slave Who Became One of the First Black Abolitionists. New York: Pegasus Books. ISBN 978-1605981758.
