= Howard H. Bell =

American scholar of African American history (1913–2012)

- Born: Howard Holman Bell; March 13, 1913; Morland, Kansas, U.S.
- Died: January 14, 2012 (aged 98)
- Occupation: Scholar
- Parent(s): Ernest Paul Bell; Irene Lucy Bell

Academic background
- Education: University of California, Berkeley; Northwestern University (PhD)

Howard Holman Bell (March 13, 1913 – January 14, 2012) was a scholar of African American history. His book Minutes of the Proceedings of the National Negro Conventions, 1830-1864 was published in 1969. He wrote an introduction to the 1970 edition of Black Separatism in the Caribbean, 1860. Several of his articles were published in the Journal of Negro Education. He worked at the Library of Congress, Texas Southern University, Dillard University, Morgan State University, and Howard University.

He was born in Morland, Kansas, the son of Ernest Paul Bell and Irene Lucy Bell. He graduated from the University of California, Berkeley, in 1941 with an undergraduate degree and served in the Navy in World War II. He received a graduate degree in 1947 from U.C. Berkeley and a PhD from Northwestern University in 1953. His thesis was a survey of the convention movement. He retired from teaching as a professor of Black history at Howard University in 1978.

He helped Floyd John Miller develop his thesis which became a book.

== Bibliography ==
- "The Negro Emigration Movement, 1849-1854: A Phase of Negro Nationalism ," Phylon 20 (Winter 1959): 134. 38.
- "Expressions of Negro Militancy in the North, 1840-1860", The Journal of Negro History 45, no. 1 (January 1960): 11–20
- "Dr. Benjamin Jesse Covington, 1961
- "Negro Nationalism; A Factor in Emigration Projects, 1848—1861," Journal of Negro History 47 (June 1962); pages 42–53.
- "The National Negro Convention", 1848
- Some Reform Interests of the Negro During the 1850s as Reflected in State Conventions, Phlyon v. 21/ 2 1960
- "The American Moral Reform Society, 1836-1841", The Journal of Negro Education
- Minutes of the Proceedings of the National Negro Conventions, 1830-1864, 1969
