= Abner Hunt Francis =

American businessman

Abner Hunt Francis (1813 – March 28, 1872) was an African-American abolitionist and entrepreneur who advocated for equality in New Jersey, Oregon, and British Columbia. He was a founding member of an anti-slavery institution, businessman, and became the first black lawmaker in British Columbia.

== Early life ==
Abner Hunt Francis was born on a small farm outside of Flemington, New Jersey around 1813. The success of his father's farm afforded Abner the opportunity to receive a "good English" education. Upon finishing his education in New Jersey, Francis moved to New York where he furthered his education in mathematics and bookkeeping, and trained as a tailor.

== Abolitionist work ==
Throughout his life, Abner Hunt Francis was an influential leader of the Black community. While in New Jersey, Francis protested the American Colonization Society, acted as an agent for the Liberator, and attended national black conventions. Francis later became a founding member of the Buffalo Anti-Slavery Society and sought progressive change such as school integration and even coordinated a state suffrage campaign. Moreover, Francis corresponded with Frederick Douglass, talking about abolitionist movements and the state of the nation. Abner's wife, Sydna Edmonia Robella Dandrich Francis was also an activist. She was a prominent leader in the women’s suffrage movement and worked toward the abolition of slavery. In addition to working alongside Abner, Sydna was the secretary of the Female Dorcas Society and president of the Ladies' Literary and Progressive Improvement Society of Buffalo. In addition, Sydna E.R. Francis's work was sometimes published in Frederik Douglass's newspaper, The North Star.

== West Coast migration and activism ==
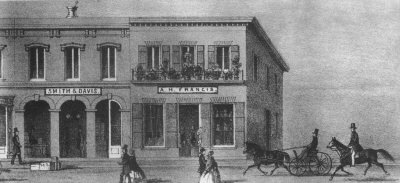
Boarding home owned by Abner Francis Hunt in Portland, Oregon

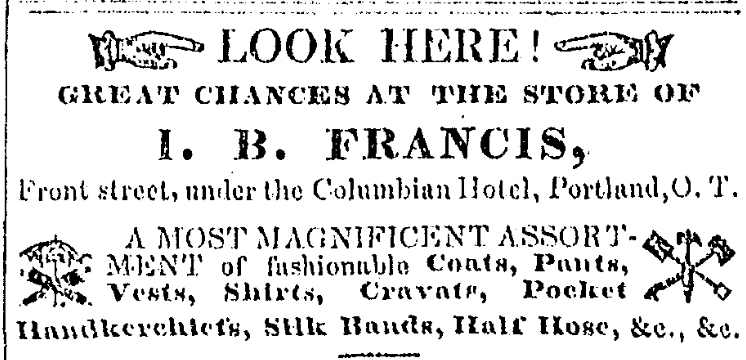
Advertisement for I. B. Francis whose store was on Front Street in Portland, Oregon

Abner Hunt Francis arrived with his wife and brother, I.B. Francis (Isaac B. Francis), in Portland, Oregon in 1851. Abner and his family were among the only African-American residents in the city. Shortly after opening their boarding house, Abner's brother was jailed for violating the territorial exclusion law of 1849. The family was subsequently ordered to appear in front of Justice Orville C. Pratt who ordered their removal from the territory within 4 months. In December 1851, an exception petition signed by 225 Oregon residents was presented to the territorial legislature which sparked an unsuccessful attempt to abolish the exclusion law. However, Abner and his family resided in Oregon for the next 10 years, amassing a fortune of $36,000 through his successful business ventures until bankruptcy finally encouraged the family to relocate. In 1865 they voluntary left Portland and begun residing in Victoria, Canada where he became the first black person elected to Victoria city council. However in 1865, the day after being sworn in, Francis resigned since he was not listed in the 1863 Assessment Role.

== Death ==
Abner Hunt Francis's obituary was published in the March 28th edition of Daily British Colonist in 1872. Francis was accredited as an influential member of the colored community. His death was quite sudden and attributed to inflammation of the bowels.
