= 1847 National Convention of Colored People and Their Friends =

The 1847 National Convention of Colored People and Their Friends, held in Troy, New York, established a newspaper that would report on the future conventions. Noteworthy black abolitionists in attendance included Henry Highland Garnet, who was hosting the convention in his church, and Frederick Douglass, who gave a speech asking blacks to stop attending pro-slavery churches.

== Issues ==
The convention examined several issues, from how to boost the black economy to what could be done about agriculture. The convention also determined that the 1848 national convention would be held in Newark, New Jersey. The convention also voted on and established a newspaper to publish about this and any future conventions. The convention also discussed the creation of a college specifically for black men. (See New Haven Excitement.) There was a discussion of the causes of slavery and what could be done to combat it, a report recommending blacks move into rural areas to find more freedom, and a debate on an economic trade deal with some Jamaicans.

== Participants ==
Participants included Henry Highland Garnet, Frederick Douglass, and Alexander Crummell. Crummell argued for the establishment of a college for black men to help avoid discrimination. Douglass and Garnet argued against the self enforced segregation and stated that there was no need for the creation of the college. When debating the causes of slavery Garnet and Douglass had a disagreement over the why the South continued to practice it. Douglas blamed religious institutions teaching and promoting a culture of slavery. Garnet disagreed and requested that the report be reconstructed to acknowledge that it was specifically pro-slavery religious institutions instead of just religious institutions. Later Douglass gave a speech requesting that blacks stop attending pro-slavery churches and stop supporting them. Garnet did not make any radical speeches in this convention although he was known for them. James McCune Smith was also present and spoke on the importance of establishing a black press.

Additionally black women were involved in raising money to finance both the convention and the new projects.

== See also ==
- Colored Conventions Movement
