= Niagara Falls conference =

The Niagara Falls convention was a meeting of twenty-nine activists, held at the Erie Beach Hotel, Fort Erie, Ontario, on the Canadian side of the Niagara River, from July 11 until 14 July 1905. It was the first meeting of The Niagara Movement, a group of African Americans, led by W. E. B. Du Bois, John Hope, and William Monroe Trotter. Instrumental in forming the National Association for the Advancement of Colored People. The subsequent Niagara Conference was held the following year at Storer College, Harpers Ferry, West Virginia.
