= Hampton Negro Conference =

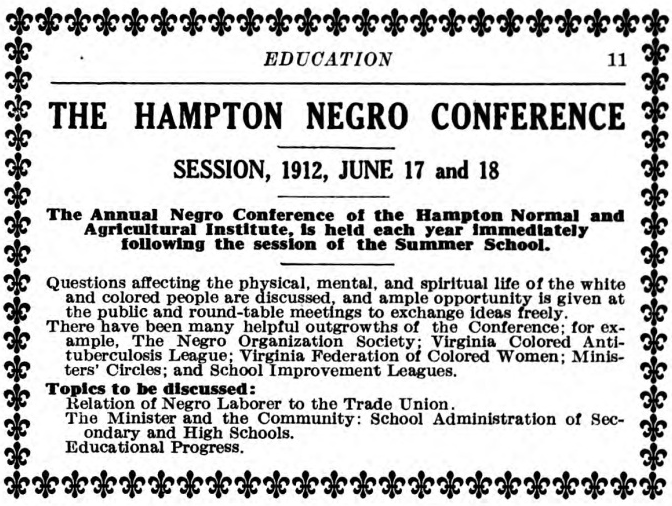
- 1912 advertisement for the Conference in the Negro Year Book and Annual Encyclopedia of the Negro
- Status: defunct
- Genre: conference
- Begins: 1897
- Ends: 1912
- Frequency: Annually
- Venue: Hampton Institute
- Locations: Hampton, Virginia, United States

The Hampton Negro Conference was a series of conferences held between 1897 and 1912 hosted by the Hampton Institute (now Hampton University) in Hampton, Virginia. It brought together Black leaders from across the Southern United States, as well as some white participants, to promote, analyze, and advertise the progress of Black Americans. According to a description in the institute's catalog, through the conferences "a general summary of the material and intellectual progress of the Negro race [was] obtained."

The first Conference was held from July 21 to July 22, 1897. The conferences ranged over a variety of topics including health, agriculture, women's issues, crime, and education. In preceding years there appear to have been more informal meetings of alumni at the institute, also referred to as the Hampton Negro Conference, as seen for example in the papers of Booker T. Washington.

The 1907 trustees report of the John F. Slater Fund for the Education of Freedmen, which had directed $10,000 to the Hampton Institute in that year, stated that the conference was attended by four hundred to five hundred teachers, prominent business and professional men, and farmers.

Writing in 1917, John Manuel Gandy characterized the Conference as "the clearing house of ideas of Negro activities" for its time.

== Publications ==
"Annual reports" and "Proceedings of" links
Year	HathiTrust link	Internet Archive link	Google Books link
1897—1st		·	
1898—2nd			
1899—3rd			·
1900—4th		·	
1901—5th			
1902—6th			
1903—7th			
1904—8th		·	·
1905—9th			·
1906—10th		·	·
1907—11th		·	
1908—12th			
1909—13th			
1910—14th			
1911—15th		·	
1912—16th			

1. † The first annual report was published as an article in The Southern Worker and Hampton School Record volume 26, number 9, September 1897, whereas the annual reports and proceedings of other years were independent publications.

== See also ==
- Colored Conventions Movement
- Atlanta Conference of Negro Problems
