= Legal Rights Association =

The Legal Rights Association (LRA) was a foundational African-American civil rights organization formed in New York City in 1855 to challenge racial segregation in the city's public transit. It served as a powerful example to subsequent rights associations, including the National Equal Rights League and the NAACP.

== Origins ==
Public transit aboard stagecoaches, streetcars, railroads, and steamboats was regularly segregated by race in the early nineteenth century. Black and white abolitionists who crusaded against southern slavery also challenged racial prejudice and discrimination in the "free" northern states. Beginning in Massachusetts in the late 1830s, activists challenged racial segregation and discrimination in public transportation. After a black woman named Elizabeth Jennings was ejected from a "white's only" streetcar in New York in July 1854, her father Thomas Jennings sued the streetcar company and won damages for what the jury deemed an unlawful ejection. Following the decision, Jennings and prominent Black activists James McCune Smith and James W.C. Pennington founded the New York Legal Rights Association to continue the struggle against segregation in New York. Their near decade-long crusade was completed in 1864 when another black woman, Ellen Anderson, successfully sued a policeman who had aided in her ejection from a "white's only" streetcar.

== Tactics ==
The Legal Rights Association pioneered long-lasting practices of minority-rights advocacy that subsequent civil-rights and civil-liberties activists have used. This included waging public-opinion campaigns, lobbying officials, fundraising, organizing the local community, civil disobedience, and initiating "test cases" to challenge racial discrimination in court. The LRA amassed a legal defense fund to support the legal costs of its members who challenged segregation in court.

== See also ==
- American Society for Legal History

== Bibliography ==
- Volk, Kyle G. (2014). Moral Minorities and the Making of American Democracy. New York: Oxford University Press. pp. 146–166, 213-214.
- Volk, Kyle G. (August 4, 2014). "NYC's 19th century Rosa Parks". New York Daily News. Archived from the original on 2014-08-05.
