= Martin Luther King Jr. =

American minister and civil rights activist (1929–1968)

The Reverend Martin Luther King Jr.
- King in 1966

1st President of the Southern Christian Leadership Conference
- In office January 10, 1957 – April 4, 1968
- Preceded by: Position established
- Succeeded by: Ralph Abernathy

Personal details
- Born: Michael King Jr. January 15, 1929 Atlanta, Georgia, U.S.
- Died: April 4, 1968 (aged 39) Memphis, Tennessee, U.S.
- Cause of death: Assassination by gunshot
- Resting place: Martin Luther King Jr. National Historical Park
- Spouse: Coretta Scott (m. 1953)
- Children: Yolanda; Martin III; Dexter; Bernice
- Parents: Martin Luther King Sr.; Alberta Williams King
- Relatives: Christine King Farris (sister); A. D. King (brother); Alveda King (niece); Edythe Scott Bagley (sister-in-law)
- Education: Morehouse College (BA); Crozer Theological Seminary (BDiv); Boston University (PhD)
- Occupation: Baptist minister; activist; leader; author
- Monuments: Full list
- Movement: Civil rights; peace; anti-war
- Awards: Nobel Peace Prize (1964); Presidential Medal of Freedom (posthumous, 1977); Congressional Gold Medal (posthumous, 2004)
- Nickname: MLK
- Martin Luther King Jr.'s voice King discussing the nomination of Barry Goldwater; Recorded August 1964

Martin Luther King Jr. (born Michael King Jr.; January 15, 1929 – April 4, 1968) was an American civil rights activist and Baptist minister who was a prominent leader of the civil rights movement from 1955 until his assassination in 1968. He advanced civil rights in the United States through the use of nonviolence and sometimes civil disobedience against Jim Crow laws and other forms of legalized discrimination, which most commonly affected African Americans.

A Black church leader, King participated in and led marches for the right to vote, desegregation, labor rights, and other civil rights. He oversaw the 1955 Montgomery bus boycott and was the first president of the Southern Christian Leadership Conference (SCLC), leading the unsuccessful Albany Movement in Albany, Georgia, and helping organize nonviolent 1963 protests in Birmingham, Alabama. King was one of the leaders of the 1963 March on Washington, where he delivered his "I Have a Dream" speech, and helped organize two of the three Selma to Montgomery marches during the 1965 Selma voting rights movement. There were dramatic standoffs with segregationist authorities, who often responded violently. The civil rights movement achieved pivotal legislative gains in the Civil Rights Act of 1964, the Voting Rights Act of 1965, and the Fair Housing Act of 1968.

King was jailed several times. Federal Bureau of Investigation (FBI) director J. Edgar Hoover considered King a radical and made him an object of COINTELPRO from 1963. FBI agents investigated him for possible communist ties, spied on his personal life, and secretly recorded him. In 1964, the FBI mailed King a threatening anonymous letter, which he interpreted as an attempt to make him commit suicide. King won the 1964 Nobel Peace Prize for combating racial inequality through nonviolent resistance. In his final years, he expanded his focus to include opposition towards poverty and the Vietnam War.

In 1968, King was planning a national occupation of Washington, D.C., to be called the Poor People's Campaign, when he was assassinated on April 4 in Memphis, Tennessee. James Earl Ray was convicted of the assassination, though it remains the subject of conspiracy theories. King's death led to riots in US cities. King was posthumously awarded the Presidential Medal of Freedom in 1977 and Congressional Gold Medal in 2003. Martin Luther King Jr. Day was established as a holiday in cities and states throughout the United States beginning in 1971; the federal holiday was first observed in 1986. The Martin Luther King Jr. Memorial on the National Mall in Washington, D.C., was dedicated in 2011.

== Early life and education ==
=== Birth ===
Michael King Jr. was born on January 15, 1929, in Atlanta, the second of three children of Michael King and Alberta King (née Williams). Alberta's father, Adam Daniel Williams, was a minister in rural Georgia, moved to Atlanta in 1893, and became pastor of the Ebenezer Baptist Church in the following year. Williams married Jennie Celeste Parks. Michael Sr. was born to sharecroppers James Albert and Delia King of Stockbridge, Georgia; he was likely of Mende (Sierra Leone) descent. He enrolled in Morehouse College to study for entry to the ministry. Michael Sr. and Alberta began dating in 1920, and married on November 25, 1926. Until Jennie's death in 1941, their home was on the second floor of Alberta's parents' home, where King was born. Michael Jr. had an older sister, Christine King Farris, and a younger brother, Alfred Daniel King.

Shortly after marrying Alberta, King Sr. became assistant pastor of the Ebenezer church. Senior pastor Williams died in the spring of 1931 and that fall King Sr. took the role. With support from his wife, he raised attendance from six hundred to several thousand. In 1934, the church sent King Sr. on a multinational trip, including one stop in Berlin for the Fifth Congress of the Baptist World Alliance (BWA). He also visited sites in Germany associated with the Reformation leader Martin Luther. In reaction to the rise of Nazism, the Congress of the BWA adopted in August 1934 a resolution "deplor[ing] and condemn[ing] as a violation of the law of God the Heavenly Father, all racial animosity, and every form of oppression or unfair discrimination toward the Jews, toward colored people, or toward subject races in any part of the world." After returning home in August 1934, Michael Sr. changed his name to Martin Luther King and his five-year-old son's name to Martin Luther King Jr. (Note: King Jr's birth certificate was later altered to read "Martin Luther King Jr." on July 23, 1957, when he was 28 years old.)

=== Early childhood ===
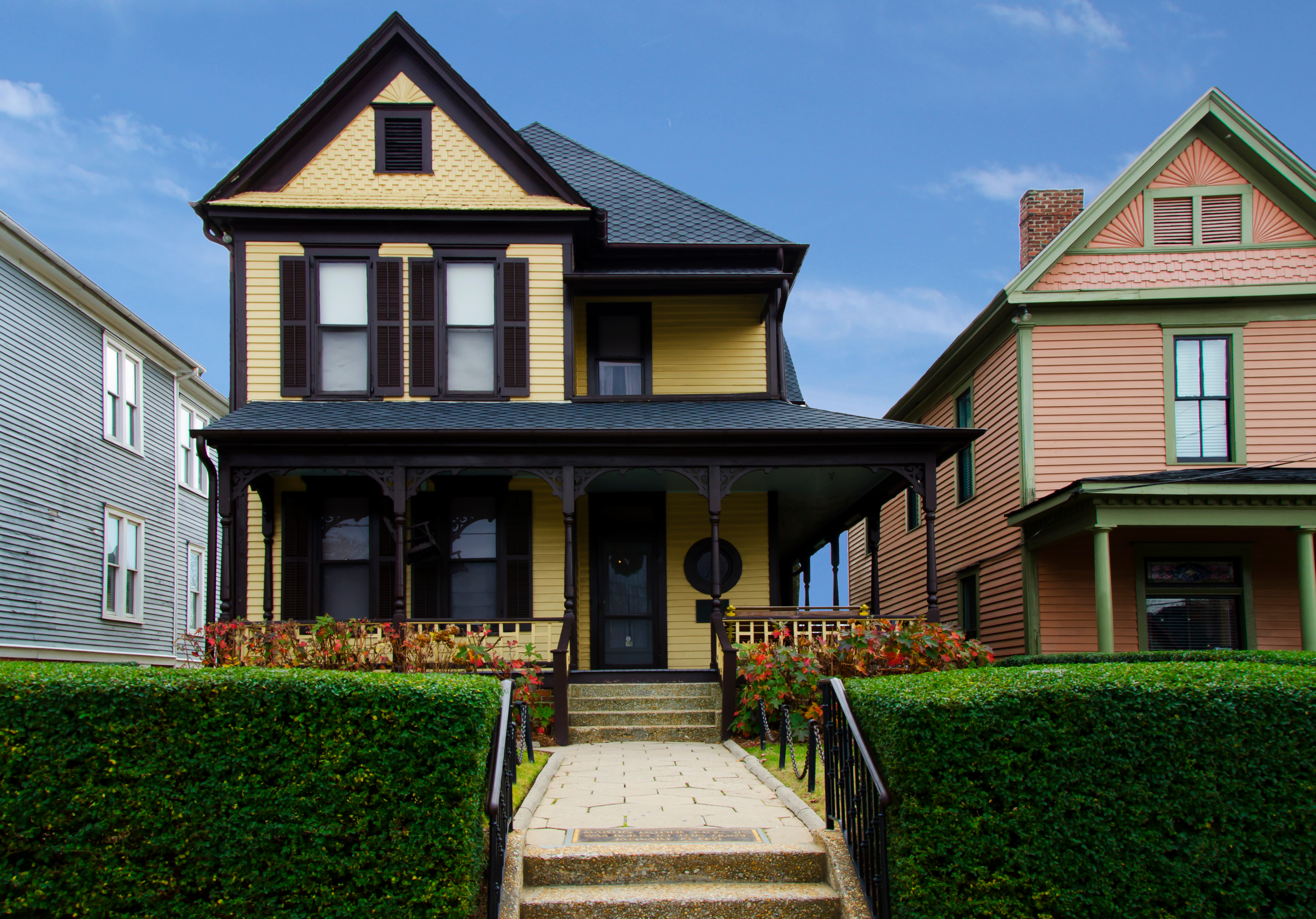
King's childhood home in Atlanta

At his childhood home, Martin Jr. and his two siblings read aloud the Bible as instructed by their father. After dinners, Martin Jr.'s grandmother Jennie, whom he affectionately referred to as "Mama", told lively stories from the Bible. Martin Jr.'s father regularly used whippings to discipline his children, sometimes having them whip each other. Martin Sr. later remarked, "[Martin Jr.] was the most peculiar child whenever you whipped him. He'd stand there, and the tears would run down, and he'd never cry." Once, when Martin Jr. witnessed his brother A.D. emotionally upset his sister Christine, he took a telephone and knocked A.D. unconscious with it. When Martin Jr. and his brother were playing at their home, A.D. slid from a banister and hit Jennie, causing her to fall unresponsive. Martin Jr., believing her dead, blamed himself and attempted suicide by jumping from a second-story window, but rose from the ground after hearing that she was alive.

Martin Jr. became friends with a white boy whose father owned a business across the street from his home. In September 1935, when the boys were about six years old, they started school. King had to attend a school for black children, Yonge Street Elementary School, while his playmate went to a separate school for white children only. Soon afterwards, the parents of the white boy stopped allowing King to play with their son, stating to him, "we are white, and you are colored". When King relayed this to his parents, they talked with him about the history of slavery and racism in America, which King would later say made him "determined to hate every white person". His parents instructed him that it was his Christian duty to love everyone.

Martin Jr. witnessed his father stand up against segregation and discrimination. Once, when stopped by a police officer who referred to Martin Sr. as "boy", Martin Sr. responded sharply that Martin Jr. was a boy but he was a man. When Martin Jr's father took him into a shoe store in downtown Atlanta, the clerk told them they needed to sit in the back. Martin Sr. refused, asserting "We'll either buy shoes sitting here or we won't buy any shoes at all", before leaving the store with Martin Jr. He told Martin Jr. afterward, "I don't care how long I have to live with this system, I will never accept it." In 1936, Martin Sr. led hundreds of African Americans in a civil rights march to the city hall in Atlanta to protest voting rights discrimination. Martin Jr. later remarked that Martin Sr. was "a real father" to him.

Martin Jr. memorized hymns and Bible verses by the time he was five years old. Beginning at six years old, he attended church events with his mother and sang hymns while she played piano. His favorite hymn was "I Want to Be More and More Like Jesus". King later became a member of the junior choir in his church. He enjoyed opera, and played the piano. King garnered a large vocabulary from reading dictionaries. He got into physical altercations with boys in his neighborhood, but oftentimes used his knowledge of words to stop or avoid fights. King showed a lack of interest in grammar and spelling, a trait that persisted throughout his life. In 1939, King sang as a member of his church choir dressed as a slave for the all-white audience at the Atlanta premiere of the film Gone with the Wind. In September 1940, at the age of 11, King was enrolled at the Atlanta University Laboratory School for the seventh grade. While there, King took violin and piano lessons and showed keen interest in history and English classes.

On May 18, 1941, when King had sneaked away from studying at home to watch a parade, he was informed that something had happened to his maternal grandmother. After returning home, he learned she had a heart attack and died while being transported to a hospital. He took her death very hard and believed that his deception in going to see the parade may have been responsible for God taking her. King again jumped out of a second-story window at his home but again survived. His father instructed him that Martin Jr. should not blame himself and that she had been called home to God as part of God's plan. Martin Jr. struggled with this. Shortly thereafter, Martin Sr. decided to move the family to a two-story brick home on a hill overlooking downtown Atlanta.

=== Adolescence ===
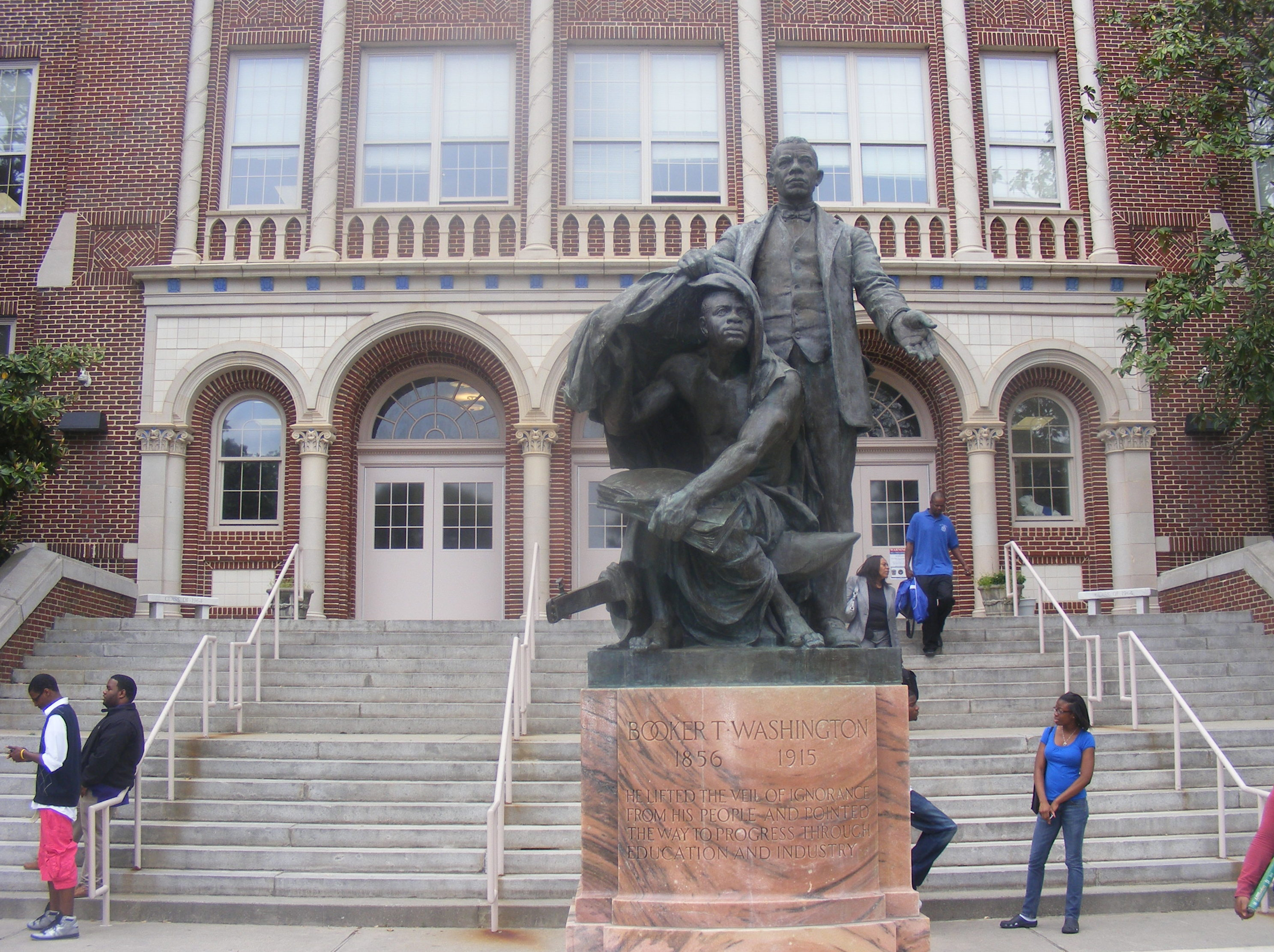
The high school that King attended was named after African-American educator Booker T. Washington.

As an adolescent, he initially felt resentment against whites due to the "racial humiliation" that he, his family, and his neighbors often had to endure. In 1942, when King was 13, he became the youngest assistant manager of a newspaper delivery station for the Atlanta Journal. In the same year, King skipped the ninth grade and enrolled in Booker T. Washington High School, where he maintained a B-plus average. The high school was the only one in the city for African-American students.

Martin Jr. was brought up in a Baptist home; as he entered adolescence he began to question the literalist teachings preached at his father's church. At the age of 13, he denied the bodily resurrection of Jesus during Sunday school. Martin Jr. said that he found himself unable to identify with the emotional displays from congregants who were frequent at his church; he doubted if he would ever attain personal satisfaction from religion. He later said of this point in his life, "doubts began to spring forth unrelentingly."

In high school, Martin Jr. became known for his public-speaking ability, with a voice that had grown into an orotund baritone. He joined the school's debate team. King continued to be most drawn to history and English, and chose English and sociology as his main subjects. King maintained an abundant vocabulary. However, he relied on his sister Christine to help him with spelling, while King assisted her with math. King also developed an interest in fashion, commonly wearing polished patent leather shoes and tweed suits, which gained him the nickname "Tweed" or "Tweedie" among his friends. He liked flirting with girls and dancing. His brother A.D. later remarked, "He kept flitting from chick to chick, and I decided I couldn't keep up with him. Especially since he was crazy about dances, and just about the best jitterbug in town."

On April 13, 1944, in his junior year, King gave his first public speech during an oratorical contest. In his speech he stated, "black America still wears chains. The finest negro is at the mercy of the meanest white man." King was selected as the winner of the contest. On the ride home to Atlanta by bus, he and his teacher were ordered by the driver to stand so that white passengers could sit. The driver of the bus called King a "black son-of-a-bitch". King initially refused but complied after his teacher told him that he would be breaking the law if he did not. As all the seats were occupied, he and his teacher were forced to stand the rest of the way to Atlanta. Later King wrote of the incident: "That night will never leave my memory. It was the angriest I have ever been in my life."

=== Morehouse College ===
During King's junior year in high school, Morehouse College—an all-male historically black college that King's father and maternal grandfather had attended—began accepting high school juniors who passed the entrance examination. As World War II was underway, many black college students had been enlisted, so the university aimed to increase their enrollment by allowing juniors to apply. In 1944, aged 15, King passed the examination and was enrolled at the university that autumn.

In the summer before King started at Morehouse, he boarded a train with his friend—Emmett "Weasel" Proctor—and a group of other Morehouse College students to work in Simsbury, Connecticut, at the tobacco farm of Cullman Brothers Tobacco. This was King's first trip into the integrated north. In a June 1944 letter to his father, King wrote about the differences that struck him: "On our way here we saw some things I had never anticipated to see. After we passed Washington there was no discrimination at all. The white people here are very nice. We go to any place we want to and sit anywhere we want to." The farm had partnered with Morehouse College to allot their wages towards the university's tuition, housing, and fees. On weekdays King and the other students worked in the fields, picking tobacco from 7:00 am to at least 5:00 pm, enduring temperatures above 100 °F, to earn roughly USD$4 per day. On Friday evenings, the students visited downtown Simsbury to get milkshakes and watch movies, and on Saturdays they would travel to Hartford, Connecticut, to see theatre performances, shop, and eat in restaurants. On Sundays, they attended church services in Hartford at a church filled with white congregants. King wrote to his parents about the lack of segregation, relaying how he was amazed they could go to "one of the finest restaurants in Hartford" and that "Negroes and whites go to the same church".

At Morehouse, King played freshman football. The summer before his last year there, in 1947, the 18-year-old King chose to enter the ministry. He would later credit the college's president, Baptist minister Benjamin Mays, with being his "spiritual mentor". King had concluded that the church offered the most assuring way to answer "an inner urge to serve humanity", and he made peace with the Baptist Church, as he believed he would be a "rational" minister with sermons that were "a respectful force for ideas, even social protest." King graduated from Morehouse with a Bachelor of Arts in sociology in 1948, aged nineteen.

== Religious education ==
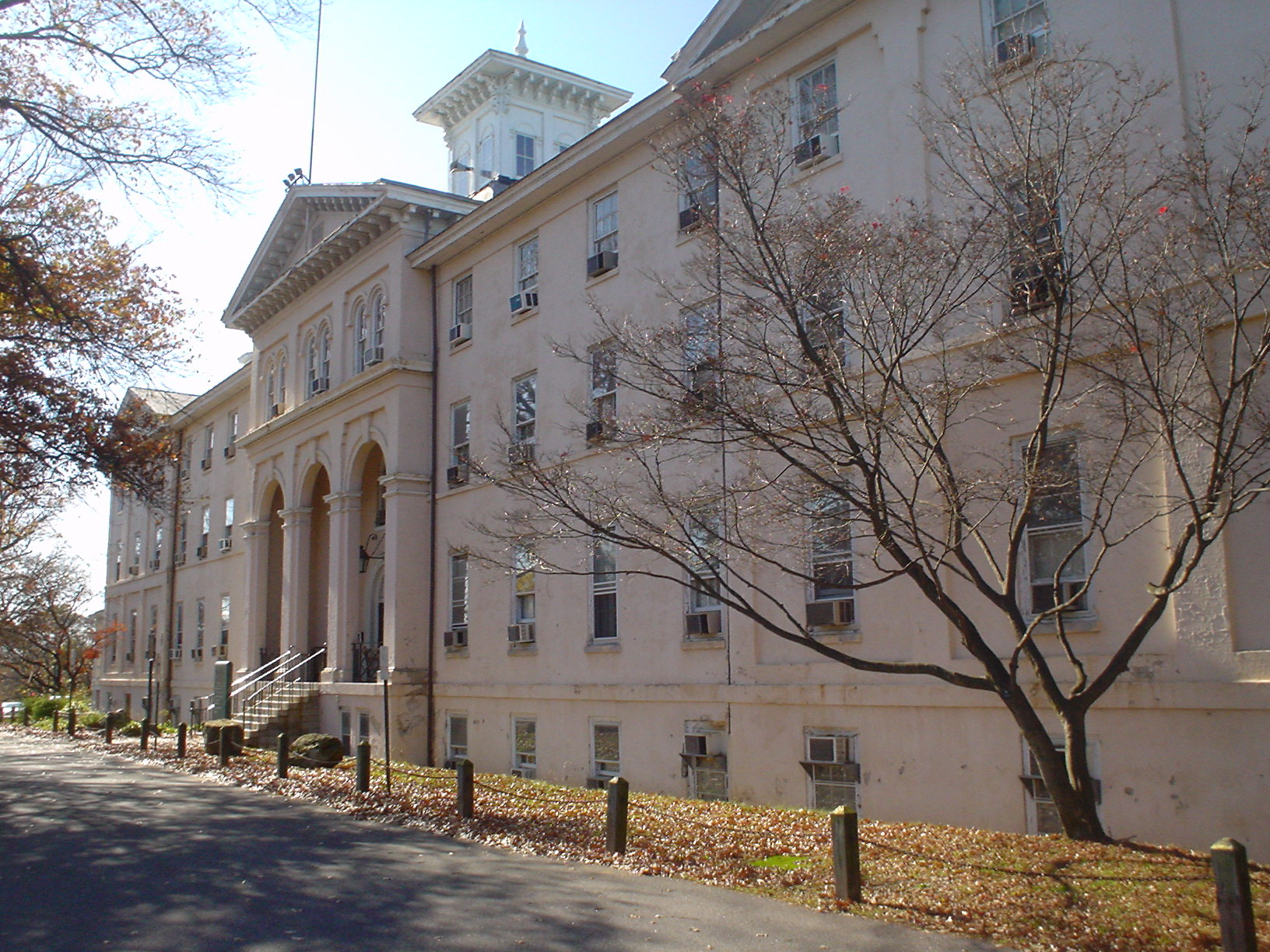
King received a Bachelor of Divinity degree from Crozer Theological Seminary in 1951 (pictured in 2009).

King enrolled in Crozer Theological Seminary in Upland, Pennsylvania, and took several courses at the University of Pennsylvania. At Crozer, King was elected president of the student body. At Penn, King took courses with William Fontaine, Penn's first African-American professor, and Elizabeth F. Flower, a professor of philosophy. King's father supported his decision to continue his education and made arrangements for King to work with J. Pius Barbour, a family friend and Crozer alumnus who pastored at Calvary Baptist Church in nearby Chester, Pennsylvania. King became known as one of the "Sons of Calvary", an honor he shared with William Augustus Jones Jr. and Samuel D. Proctor, who both went on to become well-known preachers.

King reproved another student for keeping beer in his room once, saying they shared responsibility as African Americans to bear "the burdens of the Negro race". For a time, he was interested in Walter Rauschenbusch's "social gospel". In his third year at Crozer, King became romantically involved with Betty Moitz, the white daughter of an immigrant German woman who worked in the cafeteria. King planned to marry her, but friends, as well as King's father, advised against it, saying that an interracial marriage would provoke animosity from both blacks and whites, potentially damaging his chances of ever pastoring a church in the South. King tearfully told a friend that he could not endure his mother's pain over the marriage and broke the relationship off six months later. One friend was quoted as saying, "He never recovered." Other friends, including Harry Belafonte, said Betty had been "the love of King's life." King graduated with a Bachelor of Divinity in 1951. He applied to the University of Edinburgh for a doctorate in the School of Divinity but ultimately chose Boston instead.

In 1951, King began doctoral studies in systematic theology at Boston University, and worked as an assistant minister at Boston's historic Twelfth Baptist Church with William Hunter Hester. Hester was an old friend of King's father and was an important influence on King. In Boston, King befriended a small cadre of local ministers his age, and sometimes guest pastored at their churches, including Michael E. Haynes, associate pastor at Twelfth Baptist Church in Roxbury. The young men often held bull sessions in their apartments, discussing theology, sermon style, and social issues.

At the age of 25 in 1954, King was called as pastor of the Dexter Avenue Baptist Church in Montgomery, Alabama. King received his PhD on June 5, 1955, with a dissertation (initially supervised by Edgar S. Brightman and, upon the latter's death, by Lotan Harold DeWolf) titled A Comparison of the Conceptions of God in the Thinking of Paul Tillich and Henry Nelson Wieman.

An academic inquiry in October 1991 concluded that portions of his doctoral dissertation were plagiarisms and that he had acted improperly. However, "[d]espite its finding, the committee said that 'no thought should be given to the revocation of Dr. King's doctoral degree,' an action that the panel said would serve no purpose." The committee found that the dissertation still "makes an intelligent contribution to scholarship." A letter is now attached to the copy of King's dissertation in the university library, noting that numerous passages were included without the appropriate quotations and citations of sources. Significant debate exists on how to interpret King's plagiarism.

== Marriage and family ==
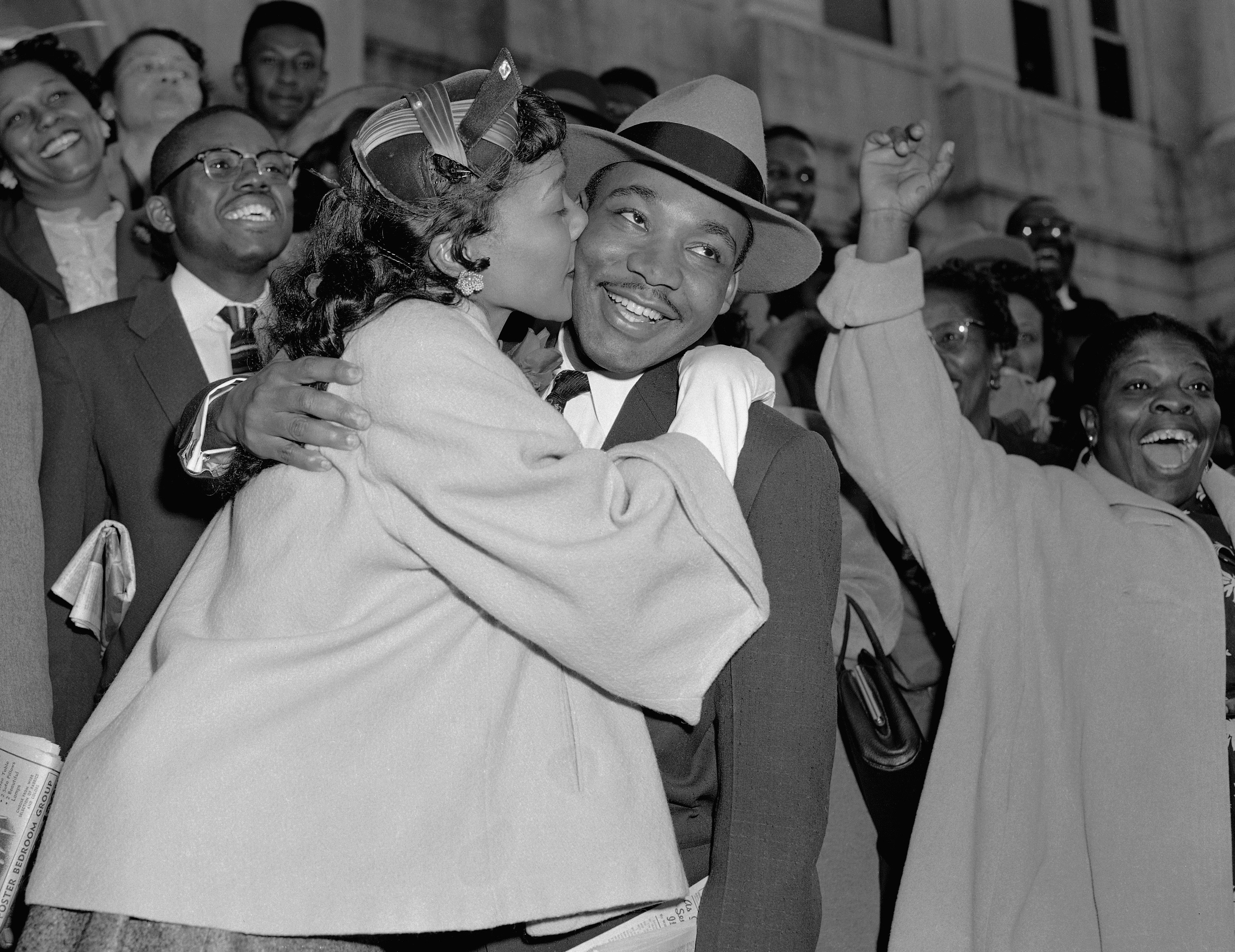
King is welcomed with a kiss from his wife, Coretta Scott King, after leaving court in Montgomery, AL, on March 22, 1956

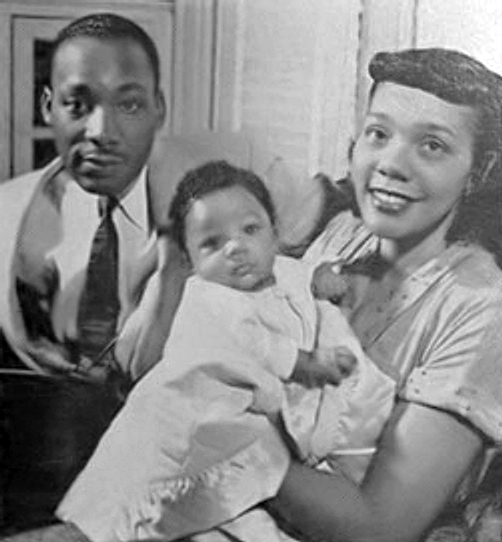
King with his wife, Coretta Scott King, and daughter, Yolanda Denise King, in 1956

While studying at Boston University, King asked a friend from Atlanta named Mary Powell, a student at the New England Conservatory of Music, if she knew any nice Southern girls. Powell spoke to fellow student Coretta Scott; Scott was not interested in dating preachers but eventually agreed to allow King to telephone her based on Powell's description and vouching. On their first call, King told Scott, "I am like Napoleon at Waterloo before your charms," to which she replied: "You haven't even met me."

King married Scott on June 18, 1953, on the lawn of her parents' house, in Heiberger, Alabama. They had four children: Yolanda King (1955–2007), Martin Luther King III (b. 1957), Dexter Scott King (1961–2024), and Bernice King (b. 1963). King limited Coretta's role in the civil rights movement, expecting her to be a housewife and mother.

== Activism and organizational leadership ==
=== Mary's Cafe Sit-In, 1950 ===
On Sunday, June 11, 1950, King, classmate at Crozer Seminary and housemate Walter McCall, and their dates Doris Wilson and Pearl Smith attended church services in Merchantville. Afterwards they stopped at tavern Mary's Cafe in Maple Shade for beers. The foursome were left waiting without anyone approaching them for service, not unexpectedly. A friend's father and King and McCall's landlord Jesthroe Hunt had warned them Black people were not welcome at Mary's. King replied to the effect of maybe they needed to go, so they could start to go anywhere they wanted. The seminarians had opted for Mary's Cafe with full knowledge of its reputation. After waiting without service, McCall approached the bar.

McCall asked bartender and Mary's Cafe owner Ernest Nichols for packaged goods (beer for takeaway). Nichols refused, explaining he could not sell packaged goods on Sundays or any day after 10pm, by law. McCall then requested 4 glasses of beer to which Nichols answered "no beer, Mr! Today is Sunday". Nichols would claim they sought him to violate New Jersey's blue law (a restriction common in South Jersey and Pennsylvania as a remnant of the influence of their Quakers roots). McCall requested ginger ales as non-alcoholic beverages were not subject to the blue law. Nichols refused the group even ginger ales and reportedly stated "the best thing would be for you to leave". King and company met refusal with refusal, and remained in their seats as was their right per New Jersey's 1945 anti-discrimination law, which guaranteed non-discrimination by race in public accommodations. Nichols stomped out and returned with a gun standing outside firing into the air reportedly shouting "I'd kill for less". Fearing for their lives, the four activists ran from the tavern. The group went to the Maple Shade Police Department where officers refused to file their complaint. King and McCall contacted Ulysses Simpson Wiggins then President of the Camden County Branch NAACP, who helped them successfully file a police report. The New York Times confirms "The complaint was against Ernest Nichols, a white tavern owner in Maple Shade, N.J., and said that he had refused to serve the black students and their dates in June 1950, and had threatened them by firing a gun in the air. The complaint was signed by the two students. One of the signatures, in a loopy, slanted cursive, reads 'M. L. King Jr.'"

Nichols was charged with disorderly conduct and violation of the anti-discrimination law. He was found guilty and fined $50, however the racial discrimination count was dismissed. In a statement submitted "in the spirit of assisting the Prosecutor" Nichol's attorney noted:

Mr. Nichols claims that this act was not intended as a threat to his colored patrons. The colored patrons, on the other hand, while they admit that the gun was not pointed at them or any of them, seemed to think that it was a threat. Mr. Nichols on the other hand states that he has been held up before and he wanted to alert his watchdog who was somewhere outside on the tavern grounds.

— Statement on Behalf of Ernest Nichols, State of New Jersey vs. Ernest Nichols, by W. Thomas McGann

King cited the incident saying it was "a formative step" in his "commitment to a more just society." The Mary's Cafe sit-in demonstrated the power of non-violent civil disobedience. Nichols' reaction in retrieving a weapon and discharging it to scare the group, or summon his guard dog, to young people's refusal to leave unserved, showed King the potency of such tactics. This sit-in is believed to be the first deployment of the non-violence and civil disobedience tactics which would distinguish King's activism and legacy.

The Mary's Cafe sit-in occurred six months prior to Mordecai Johnson's Lecture on Gandi at the First Unitarian Church of Philadelphia on November 19, 1950, where King would be formally exposed to these tactics. At that lecture and in discussions with Dr. Johnson at the Fellowship House, Dr. King would be inspired and galvanized by how Mahatma Gandhi integrated Henry David Thoreau's theory of Nonviolent resistance and civil disobedience tactics. Patrick Duff, a South Jersey resident, discovered the police report detailing the events at Mary's after searching the archive at The Martin Luther King, Jr. Research and Education Institute.

=== Montgomery bus boycott, 1955 ===
The Dexter Avenue Baptist Church was influential in the Montgomery African-American community. As the church's pastor, King became known for his oratorical preaching in Montgomery and surrounding region.

In March 1955, Claudette Colvin—a black schoolgirl in Montgomery—refused to give up her bus seat to a white man in violation of Jim Crow laws, local laws in the Southern US that enforced racial segregation. On December 1, 1955, Rosa Parks was arrested for refusing to give up her seat on a city bus. These incidents led to the Montgomery bus boycott, which was urged and planned by Edgar Nixon and led by King. The other ministers asked him to take a leadership role because his relative newness to community leadership made it easier for him to speak out. King was hesitant but decided to do so if no one else wanted it.

The boycott lasted for 385 days, and the situation became so tense that King's house was bombed. King was arrested for traveling 30 mph in a 25 mph zone and jailed, which drew the attention of national media, and increased King's public stature. The controversy ended when the US District Court issued a ruling in Browder v. Gayle that prohibited racial segregation on Montgomery public buses.

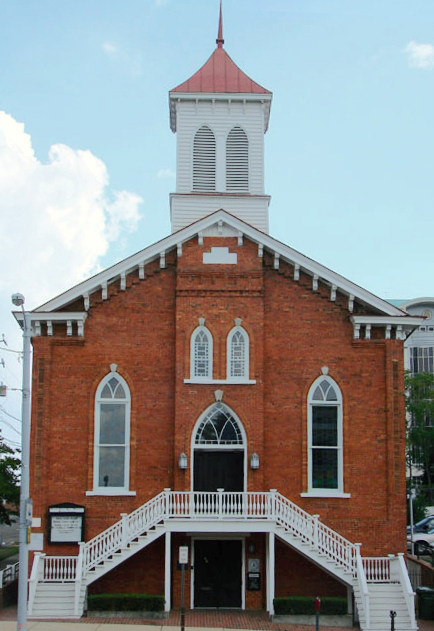
King first rose to prominence in the civil rights movement while minister of Dexter Avenue Baptist Church in Montgomery, Alabama.

King's role in the bus boycott transformed him into a national figure and the best-known spokesman of the civil rights movement.

=== Southern Christian Leadership Conference ===
In 1957, King, along with Christian ministers Ralph Abernathy, Fred Shuttlesworth, and Joseph Lowery, as well as Bayard Rustin and other activists founded the Southern Christian Leadership Conference (SCLC). The group was created to harness the moral authority and organizing power of black churches to conduct nonviolent protests in the service of civil rights reform. The group was inspired by the crusades of evangelist Billy Graham, who befriended King, as well as the national organizing of the group In Friendship, founded by King allies Stanley Levison and Ella Baker. King led the SCLC until his death. The SCLC's 1957 Prayer Pilgrimage for Freedom was the first time King addressed a national audience.

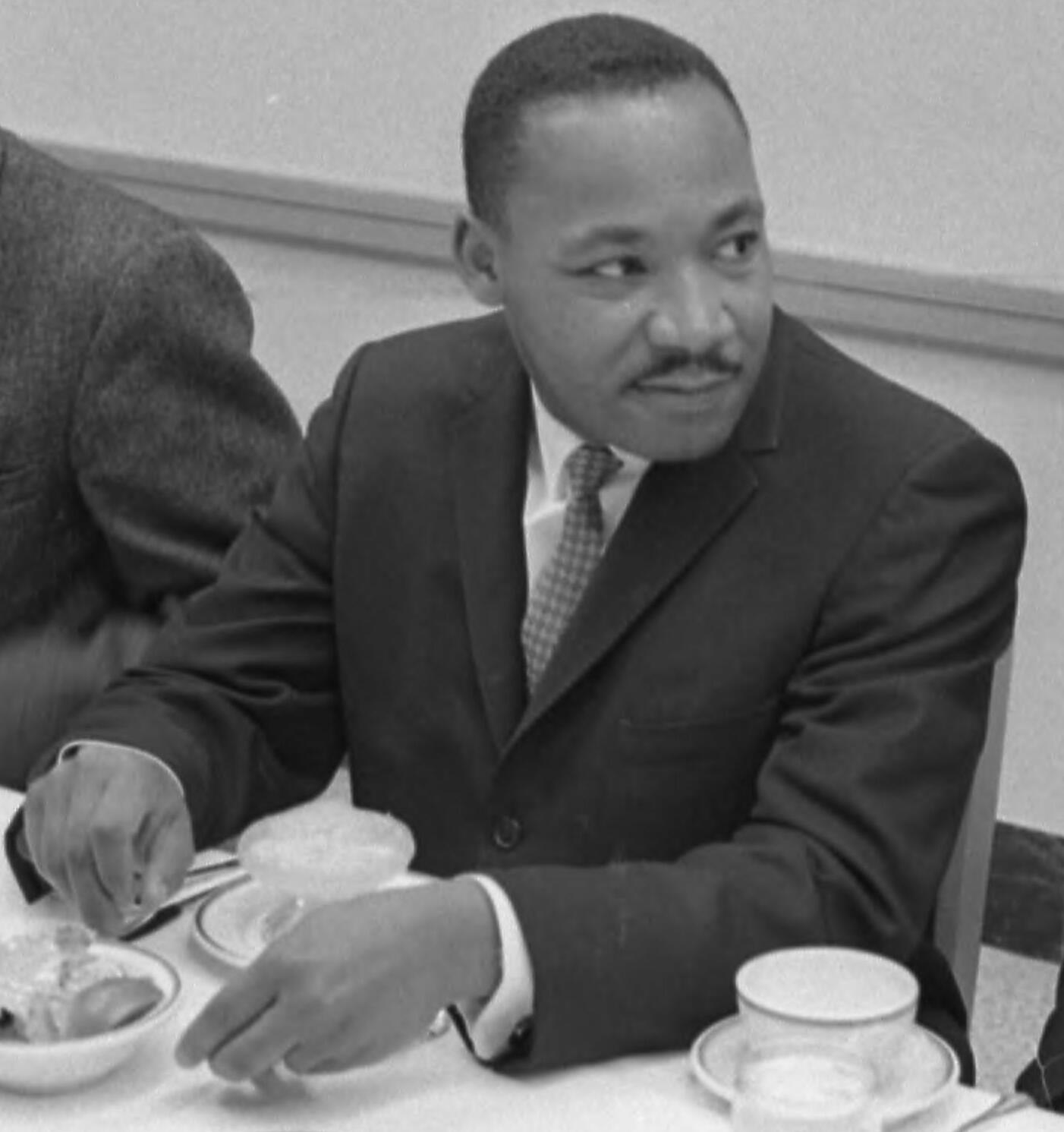
King in November 1962

Harry Wachtel joined King's legal advisor Clarence B. Jones in defending four ministers of the SCLC in the libel case Abernathy et al. v. Sullivan; the case was litigated about the newspaper advertisement "Heed Their Rising Voices". Wachtel founded a tax-exempt fund to cover the suit's expenses and assist the civil rights movement through more effective fundraising. King served as honorary president of this organization, named the "Gandhi Society for Human Rights". In 1962, King and the Gandhi Society produced a document that called on U.S. president John F. Kennedy to issue an executive order to deliver a blow to segregation as a kind of Second Emancipation Proclamation. Kennedy did not execute the order. The FBI, under written directive from Attorney General Robert F. Kennedy, began tapping King's telephone line in the fall of 1963. Kennedy was concerned that public allegations of communists in the SCLC would derail the administration's civil rights initiatives. He warned King to discontinue these associations and felt compelled to issue the directive that authorized the FBI to wiretap King and other SCLC leaders. FBI Director J. Edgar Hoover feared the civil rights movement and investigated the allegations of communist infiltration. When no evidence emerged to support this, the FBI used the incidental details caught on tape over the next five years, as part of its COINTELPRO program, in attempts to force King out of his leadership position.

King believed that organized, nonviolent protest against the system of southern segregation known as Jim Crow laws would lead to extensive media coverage of the struggle for black equality. Journalistic accounts and televised footage of the daily indignities suffered by southern blacks, and of segregationist violence and harassment, produced a wave of sympathetic public opinion that convinced most Americans that the civil rights movement was the most important political issue in the early 1960s.

King organized and led marches for blacks' right to vote, desegregation, labor rights, and other basic civil rights. Most of these rights were successfully enacted into law with the Civil Rights Act of 1964 and the 1965 Voting Rights Act. The SCLC used tactics of nonviolent protest with success, by strategically choosing the methods and places in which protests were carried out. There were often dramatic stand-offs with segregationist authorities, who sometimes turned violent.

=== Survived knife attack, 1958 ===
On September 20, 1958, King was signing copies of his book Stride Toward Freedom in Blumstein's department store in Harlem when Izola Curry—a mentally ill black woman who thought King was conspiring against her with communists—stabbed him in the chest with a letter opener. King underwent surgery by Aubre de Lambert Maynard, Emil Naclerio and John W. V. Cordice; he remained hospitalized for weeks. Curry was later found mentally incompetent to stand trial. Accepting his doctor's advice, King, along with Coretta and Alabama State College history professor Lawrence D. Reddick, traveled to Europe, India and the Middle East from February to March 1959 to recuperate. Upon returning to Montgomery, King agreed with the SCLC board to fire executive director John Lee Tilley, but hired co-founder Bayard Rustin to manage press relations.

=== Atlanta sit-ins, prison sentence, and the 1960 elections ===
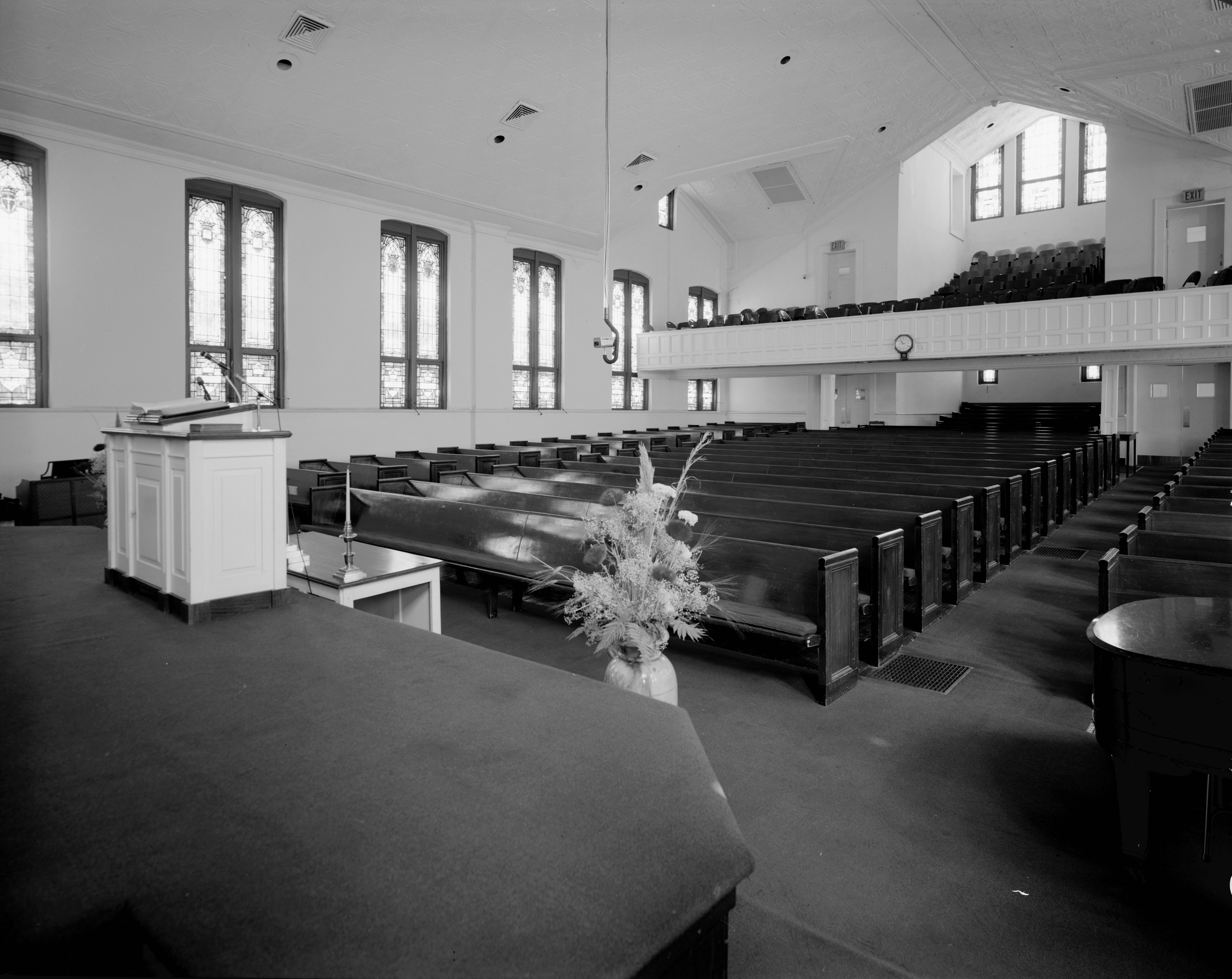
King led the Southern Christian Leadership Conference and later became co-pastor with his father at Ebenezer Baptist Church in Atlanta (pulpit and sanctuary pictured).

In December 1959, King announced his return to Atlanta at the request of the SCLC. In Atlanta, King served until his death as co-pastor with his father at the Ebenezer Baptist Church. Georgia governor Ernest Vandiver expressed open hostility towards King's return and vowed to keep King under surveillance. On May 4, 1960, King drove writer Lillian Smith to Emory University when police stopped them. King was cited for "driving without a license" because he had not yet been issued a Georgia license. King's Alabama license was still valid, and Georgia law did not mandate any time limit for issuing a local license. King paid a fine but was unaware his lawyer agreed to a plea deal that included probation.

Meanwhile, the Atlanta Student Movement had been acting to desegregate businesses and public spaces, organizing the Atlanta sit-ins from March 1960 onwards. In August the movement asked King to participate in a mass October sit-in, timed to highlight how 1960's presidential election campaigns had ignored civil rights. The coordinated day of action took place on October 19. King participated in a sit-in at the restaurant inside Rich's, Atlanta's largest department store, and was among the many arrested. The authorities released everyone over the next few days, except King. Invoking his probationary plea deal, Judge J. Oscar Mitchell sentenced King on October 25 to four months of hard labor. Before dawn the next day, King was transported to Georgia State Prison.

The arrest and harsh sentence drew nationwide attention. Many feared for King's safety, as he started a sentence with people convicted of violent crimes, many of whom were white and hostile to his activism. Presidential candidates were asked to weigh in, at a time when parties were courting the support of Southern Whites and their political leadership including Governor Vandiver. Nixon, with whom King had a closer relationship before, declined to make a statement despite a visit from Jackie Robinson requesting his intervention. Nixon's opponent John F. Kennedy called the governor, enlisted his brother Robert to exert more pressure on state authorities, and, at the request of Sargent Shriver, called King's wife to offer his help. The pressure from Kennedy and others proved effective, and King was released two days later. King's father decided to openly endorse Kennedy's candidacy for the November 8 election which he narrowly won.

After the October 19 sit-ins and following unrest, a 30-day truce was declared in Atlanta for desegregation negotiations. However, negotiations failed and sit-ins and boycotts resumed for several months. On March 7, 1961, a group of Black elders including King notified student leaders that a deal had been reached: the city's lunch counters would desegregate in fall 1961, in conjunction with the court-mandated desegregation of schools. Many students were disappointed at the compromise. In a meeting on March 10 at Warren Memorial Methodist Church, the audience was hostile and frustrated. King gave an impassioned speech calling participants to resist the "cancerous disease of disunity", helping to calm tensions. Rustin and King organized a civil rights march near the 1960 Democratic National Convention in Los Angeles. Representative Adam Clayton Powell Jr. threatened to leak rumors of a false affair between Rustin and King to the press. King canceled the march and Rustin resigned from his position with the SCLC.

=== Albany Movement, 1961 ===
The Albany Movement was a desegregation coalition formed in Albany, Georgia, in November 1961. In December, King and the SCLC became involved. The movement mobilized thousands of citizens for a nonviolent attack on segregation in the city and attracted nationwide attention. When King first visited on December 15, 1961, he "had planned to stay a day or so and return home after giving counsel." The following day he was swept up in a mass arrest of peaceful demonstrators, and he declined bail until the city made concessions. According to King, "that agreement was dishonored and violated by the city" after he left.

King returned in July 1962 and was given the option of 45 days in jail or a $178 fine (equivalent to $1,900 in 2025); he chose jail. Three days into his sentence, Police Chief Laurie Pritchett discreetly arranged for King's fine to be paid and ordered his release. King later wrote, "We had witnessed persons being kicked off lunch counter stools ... ejected from churches ... and thrown into jail ... But for the first time, we witnessed being kicked out of jail." It was later acknowledged by the King Center that Billy Graham was the one who bailed King out.

After nearly a year of intense activism with few tangible results, the movement began to deteriorate. King requested a halt to all demonstrations and a "Day of Penance" to promote nonviolence and maintain the moral high ground. Divisions within the black community and the canny, low-key response by local government defeated efforts. Though the Albany effort proved a key lesson in tactics for King and the civil rights movement, the national media was highly critical of King's role in the defeat, and the SCLC's lack of results contributed to a growing gulf between the organization and the more radical SNCC. After Albany, King sought to choose engagements for the SCLC in which he could control the circumstances, rather than entering into pre-existing situations.

=== Birmingham campaign, 1963 ===
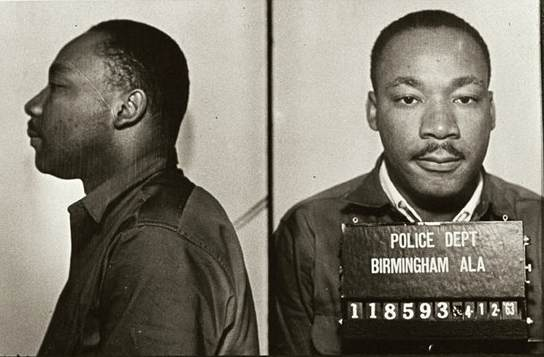
King was arrested in 1963 for protesting the treatment of black people in Birmingham.

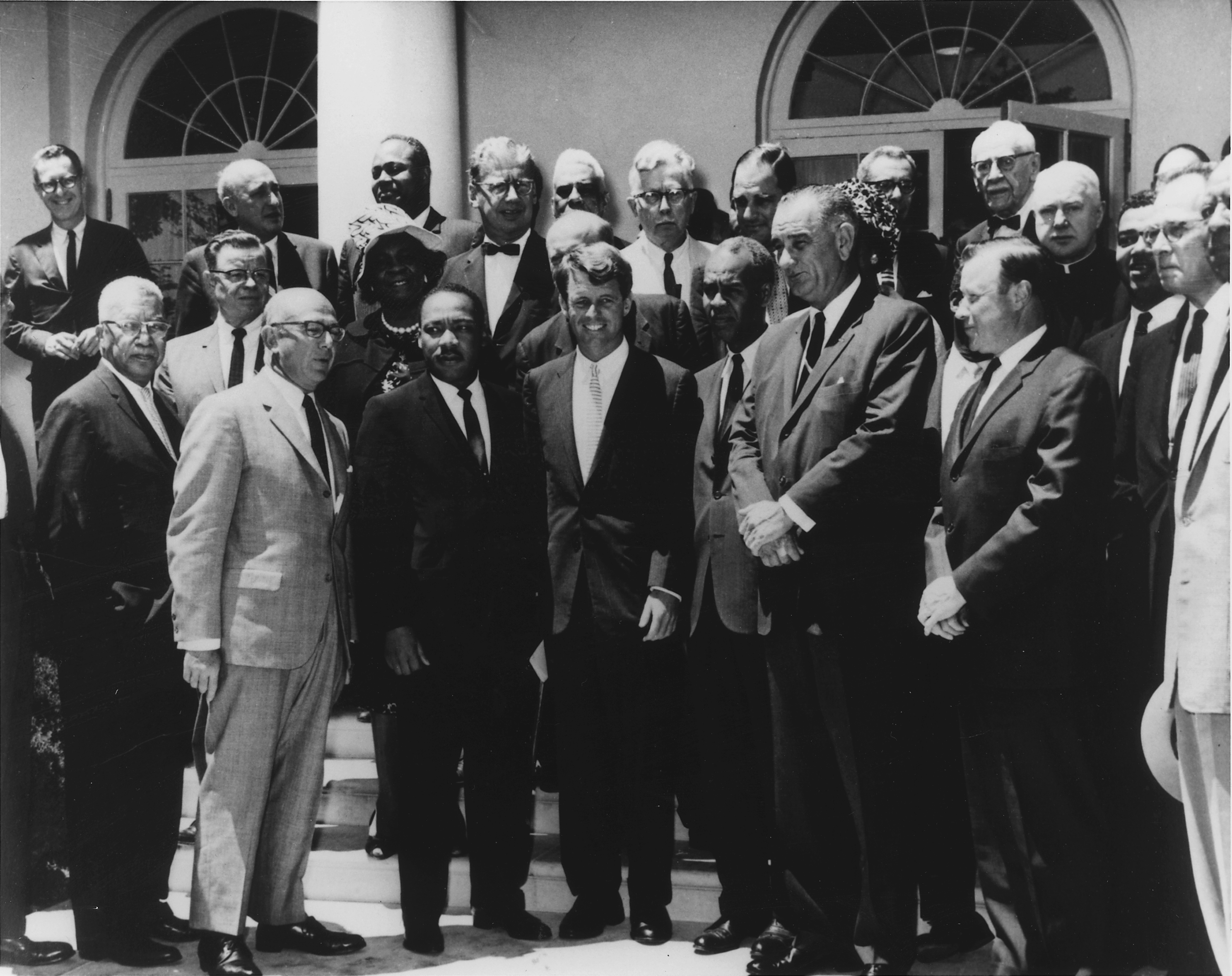
Vice President Lyndon B. Johnson and Attorney General Robert F. Kennedy with King, Benjamin Mays, and other civil rights leaders, June 22, 1963

In April 1963, the SCLC began a campaign against racial segregation and economic injustice in Birmingham, Alabama. The campaign used nonviolent but intentionally confrontational tactics, developed in part by Wyatt Tee Walker. Black people in Birmingham, organizing with the SCLC, occupied public spaces with marches and sit-ins, openly violating laws that they considered unjust.

King's intent was to provoke mass arrests and "create a situation so crisis-packed that it will inevitably open the door to negotiation." The campaign's early volunteers did not succeed in shutting down the city, or in drawing media attention to the police's actions. Over the concerns of an uncertain King, SCLC strategist James Bevel changed the course of the campaign by recruiting children and young adults to join the demonstrations. Newsweek called this strategy a Children's Crusade.

The Birmingham Police Department, led by Eugene "Bull" Connor, used high-pressure water jets and police dogs against protesters, including children. Footage of the police response was broadcast on national television, shocking many white Americans and consolidating black Americans behind the movement. Not all demonstrators were peaceful, despite the avowed intentions of the SCLC. In some cases, bystanders attacked the police, who responded with force. King and the SCLC were criticized for putting children in harm's way. But the campaign was a success: Connor lost his job, the "Jim Crow" signs came down, and public places became more open to blacks. King's reputation improved immensely.

King was arrested and jailed early in the campaign—his 13th arrest out of 29. From his cell, he composed the now-famous "Letter from Birmingham Jail" that responds to calls to pursue legal channels for social change. The letter has been described as "one of the most important historical documents penned by a modern political prisoner". King argues that the crisis of racism is too urgent, and the current system too entrenched: "We know through painful experience that freedom is never voluntarily given by the oppressor; it must be demanded by the oppressed." He points out that the Boston Tea Party, a celebrated act of rebellion in the American colonies, was illegal civil disobedience, and that, conversely, "everything Adolf Hitler did in Germany was 'legal'." Walter Reuther, president of the United Auto Workers, arranged for $160,000 to bail out King and his fellow protestors.

"I have almost reached the regrettable conclusion that the Negro's great stumbling block in his stride toward freedom is not the White Citizen's Councilor or the Ku Klux Klanner, but the white moderate, who is more devoted to "order" than to justice; who prefers a negative peace which is the absence of tension to a positive peace which is the presence of justice; who constantly says: "I agree with you in the goal you seek, but I cannot agree with your methods of direct action"; who paternalistically believes he can set the timetable for another man's freedom; who lives by a mythical concept of time and who constantly advises the Negro to wait for a "more convenient season."

— Martin Luther King Jr.

=== March on Washington, 1963 ===
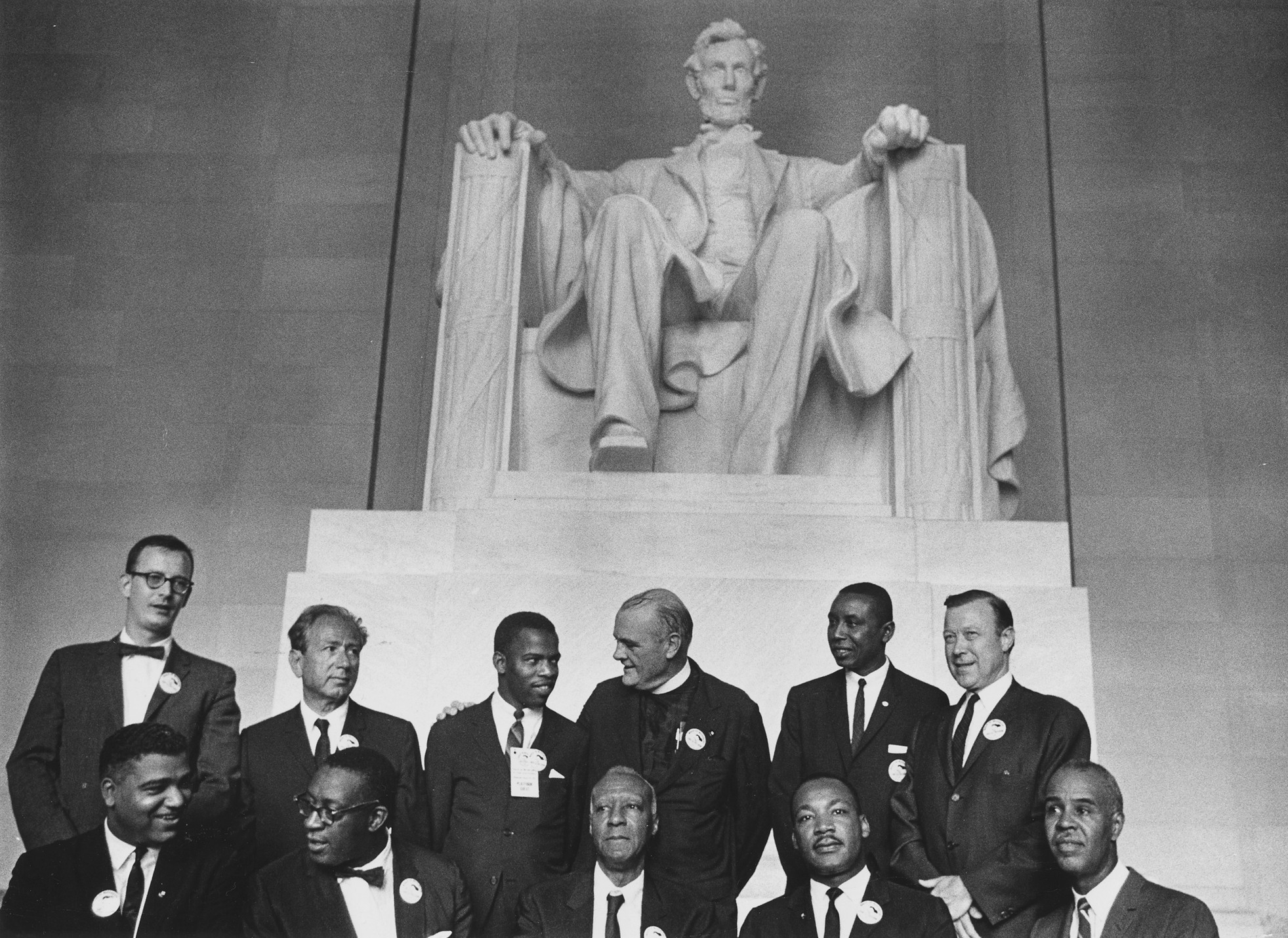
Leaders of the March on Washington posing in front of the Lincoln Memorial

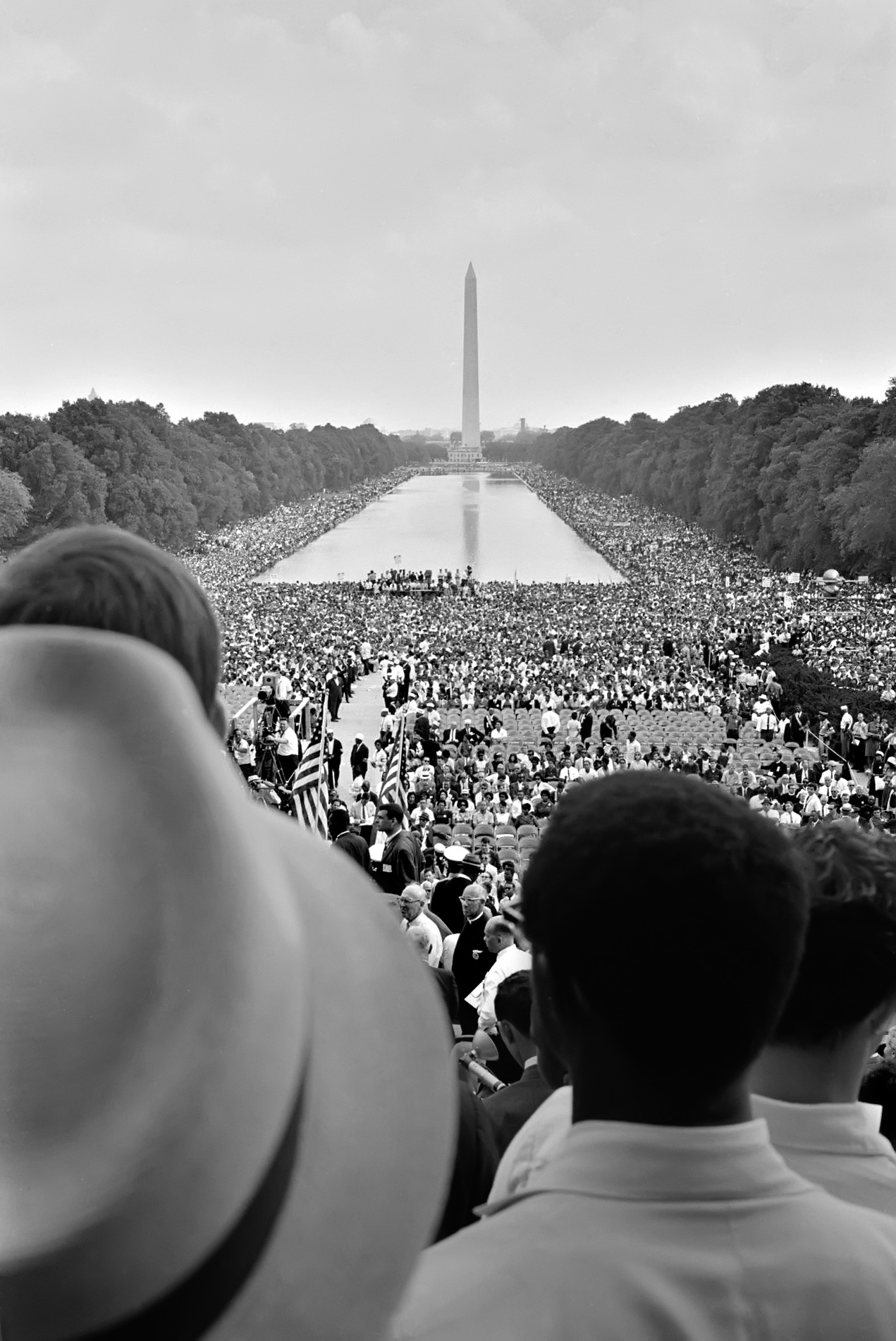
The March on Washington for Jobs and Freedom (1963)

King, representing the SCLC, was among the leaders of the "Big Six" civil rights organizations who were instrumental in the organization of the March on Washington for Jobs and Freedom, which took place on August 28, 1963. The other leaders and organizations comprising the Big Six were Roy Wilkins from the National Association for the Advancement of Colored People; Whitney Young, National Urban League; A. Philip Randolph, Brotherhood of Sleeping Car Porters; John Lewis, SNCC; and James L. Farmer Jr., Congress of Racial Equality.

Bayard Rustin's open homosexuality, support of socialism, and former ties to the Communist Party USA caused many white and African-American leaders to demand King distance himself, which King agreed to do. However, he did collaborate in the 1963 March on Washington, for which Rustin was the primary organizer. For King, this role was another which courted controversy, since he was a key figure who acceded to the wishes of President Kennedy in changing the focus of the march. Kennedy initially opposed the march outright, because he was concerned it would negatively impact the drive for passage of civil rights legislation. However, the organizers were firm the march would proceed. With the march going forward, the Kennedys decided it was important to ensure its success. President Kennedy was concerned the turnout would be less than 100,000 and enlisted the aid of additional church leaders and Walter Reuther, president of the United Automobile Workers, to help mobilize demonstrators.

The March, a 1964 documentary film produced by the United States Information Agency. King's speech has been redacted from this video because of the copyright held by King's estate.

The march originally was planned to dramatize the desperate condition of blacks in the southern US and place organizers' concerns and grievances squarely before the seat of power in the capital. Organizers intended to denounce the federal government for its failure to safeguard the civil rights and physical safety of civil rights workers and blacks. The group acquiesced to presidential pressure, and the event ultimately took on a less strident tone. As a result, some civil rights activists felt it presented an inaccurate, sanitized pageant of racial harmony; Malcolm X called it the "Farce on Washington", and the Nation of Islam forbade its members from attending.

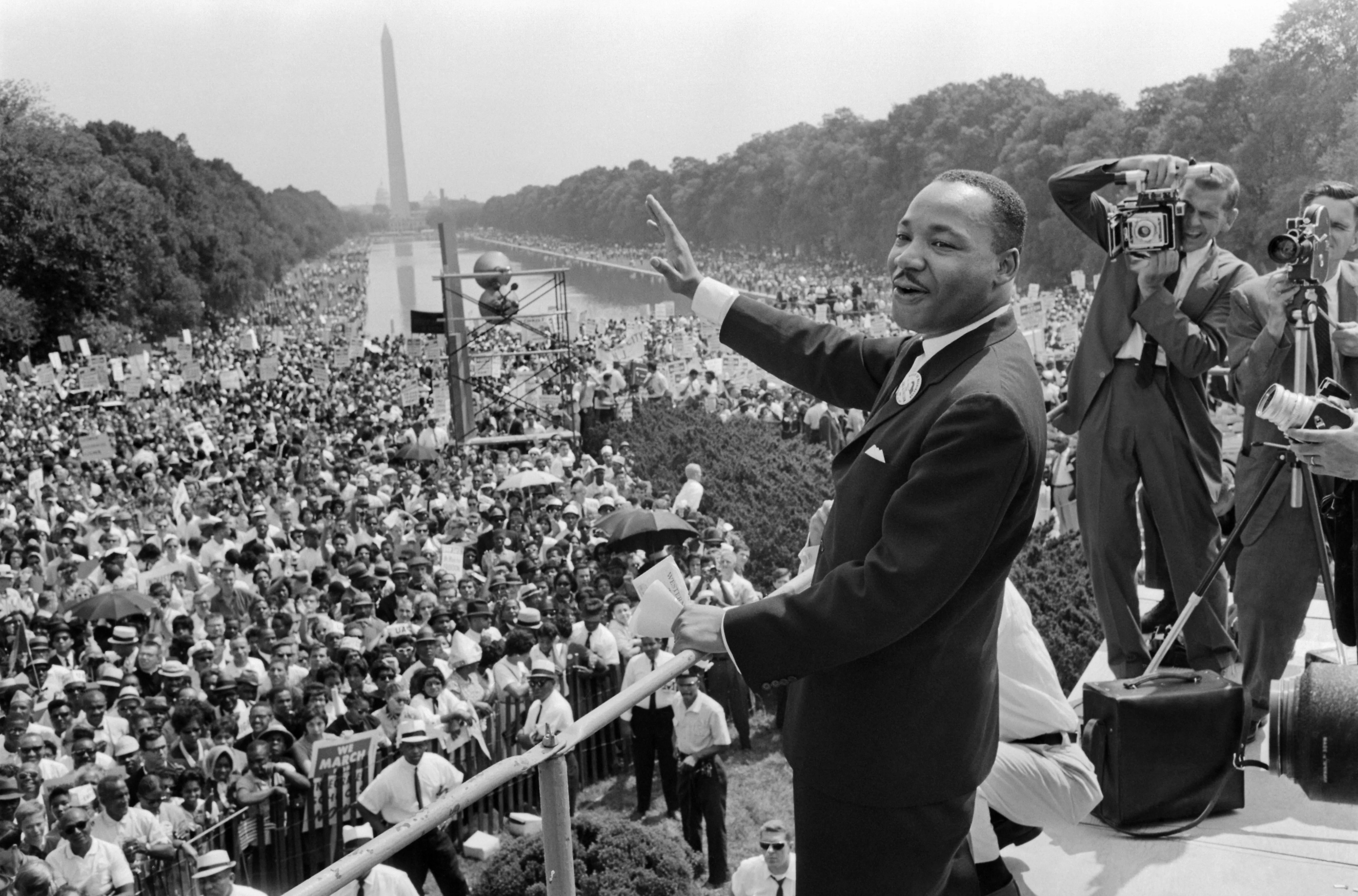
King gave his most famous speech, "I Have a Dream", before the Lincoln Memorial during the 1963 March on Washington for Jobs and Freedom.

I Have a Dream
30-second sample from "I Have a Dream" speech by Martin Luther King Jr. at the March on Washington for Jobs and Freedom on August 28, 1963

The march made specific demands: an end to racial segregation in public schools; meaningful civil rights legislation, including a law prohibiting racial discrimination in employment; protection of civil rights workers from police brutality; a $2 minimum wage for all workers (equivalent to $21 in 2025); and self-government for Washington, D.C., then governed by congressional committee. Despite tensions, the march was a resounding success. More than a quarter of a million people of diverse ethnicities attended, sprawling from the steps of the Lincoln Memorial onto the National Mall. At the time, it was the largest gathering of protesters in Washington, D.C.'s history.

King delivered a 17-minute speech, later known as "I Have a Dream". In the speech's most famous passage – in which he departed from his prepared text, possibly at the prompting of Mahalia Jackson, who shouted, "Tell them about the dream!" – King said:

I say to you today, my friends, so even though we face the difficulties of today and tomorrow, I still have a dream. It is a dream deeply rooted in the American dream.

I have a dream that one day this nation will rise up and live out the true meaning of its creed: "We hold these truths to be self-evident: that all men are created equal."

I have a dream that one day on the red hills of Georgia the sons of former slaves and the sons of former slave owners will be able to sit down together at the table of brotherhood.

I have a dream that one day even the state of Mississippi, a state sweltering with the heat of injustice, sweltering with the heat of oppression, will be transformed into an oasis of freedom and justice.

I have a dream that my four little children will one day live in a nation where they will not be judged by the color of their skin but by the content of their character.

I have a dream today.

I have a dream that one day, down in Alabama, with its vicious racists, with its governor having his lips dripping with the words of interposition and nullification; one day right there in Alabama, little black boys and black girls will be able to join hands with little white boys and white girls as sisters and brothers.

I have a dream today.

"I Have a Dream" came to be regarded as one of the finest speeches in the history of oratory. The March, and especially King's speech, helped put civil rights at the top of the agenda of reformers and facilitated passage of the Civil Rights Act of 1964.

=== New York City, 1964 ===
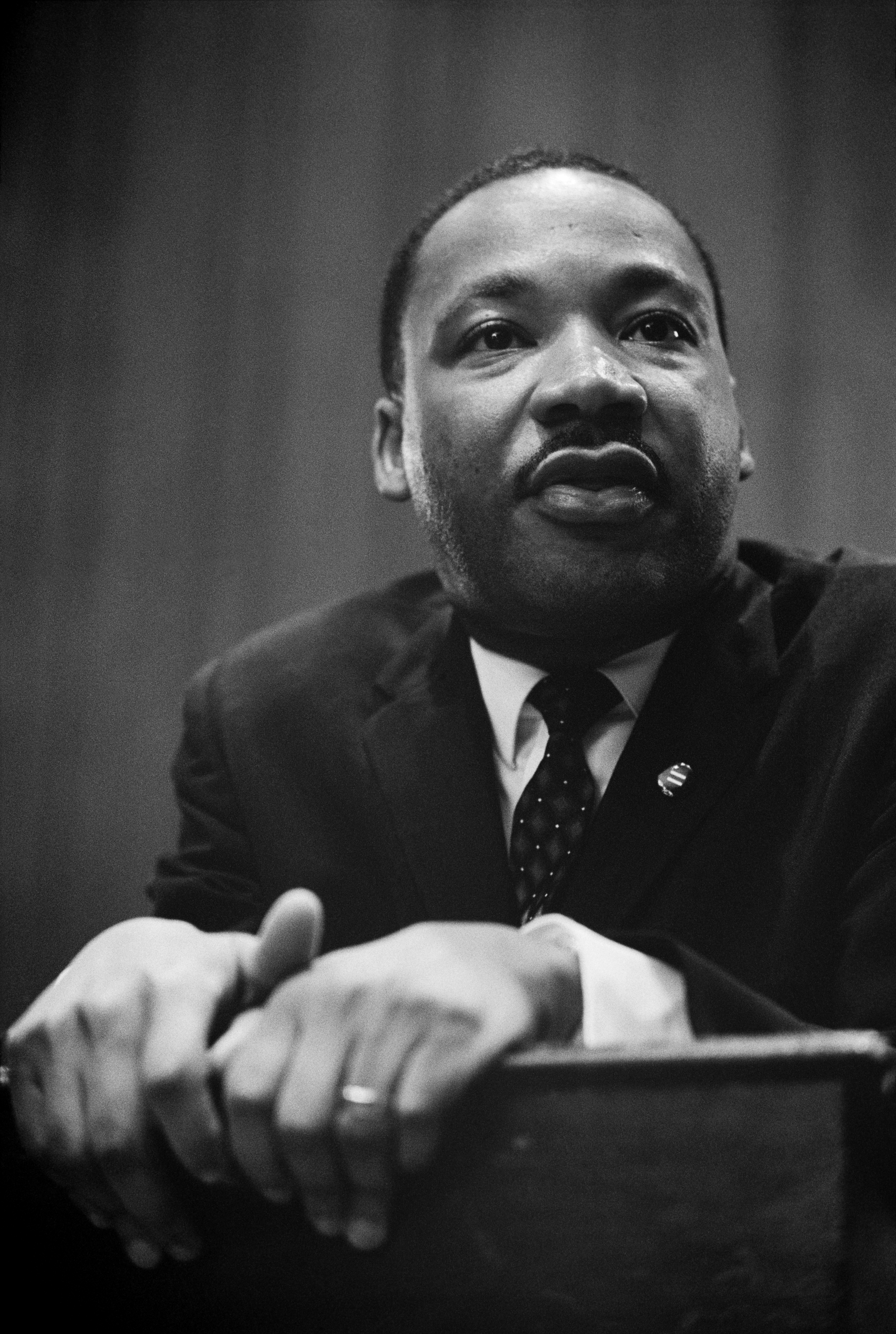
King at a press conference in March 1964

On February 6, 1964, King delivered the inaugural speech of a lecture series initiated at the New School called "The American Race Crisis". In his remarks, King referred to a conversation he had recently had with Jawaharlal Nehru in which he compared the sad condition of many African Americans to that of India's untouchables. In his March 18, 1964, interview with Robert Penn Warren, King compared his activism to his father's, citing his training in non-violence as a key difference. He also discusses the next phase of the civil rights movement and integration.

=== St. Augustine, Florida, 1964 ===
In March 1964, King and the SCLC joined forces with Robert Hayling's then-controversial movement in St. Augustine, Florida. Hayling's group had been affiliated with the NAACP but was forced out of the organization for advocating armed self-defense alongside nonviolent tactics. However, the pacifist SCLC accepted them. King and the SCLC worked to bring white Northern activists to St. Augustine, including a delegation of rabbis and the 72-year-old mother of the governor of Massachusetts, all of whom were arrested. During June, the movement marched nightly through the city, "often facing counter demonstrations by the Klan, and provoking violence that garnered national media attention." Hundreds of the marchers were arrested and jailed. During this movement, the Civil Rights Act of 1964 was passed.

=== Biddeford, Maine, 1964 ===
On May 7, 1964, King spoke at Saint Francis College's "The Negro and the Quest for Identity", in Biddeford, Maine. This was a symposium that brought together many civil rights leaders. King spoke about how "We must get rid of the idea of superior and inferior races," through nonviolent tactics.

=== Scripto strike in Atlanta, 1964 ===
Starting in November 1964, King supported a labor strike by several hundred workers at the Scripto factory in Atlanta, just a few blocks from Ebenezer Baptist. Many of the strikers were congregants of his church, and the strike was supported by other civil rights leaders. King helped elevate the labor dispute from a local to nationally known event and led the SCLC to organize a nationwide boycott of Scripto products. However, as the strike stretched into December, King, who was wanting to focus more on a civil rights campaign in Selma, Alabama, began to negotiate in secret with Scripto's president Carl Singer and eventually brokered a deal where the SCLC would call off their boycott in exchange for the company giving the striking employees their Christmas bonuses. King's involvement in the strike ended on December 24 and a contract between the company and union was signed on January 9.

=== Selma voting rights movement and "Bloody Sunday", 1965 ===
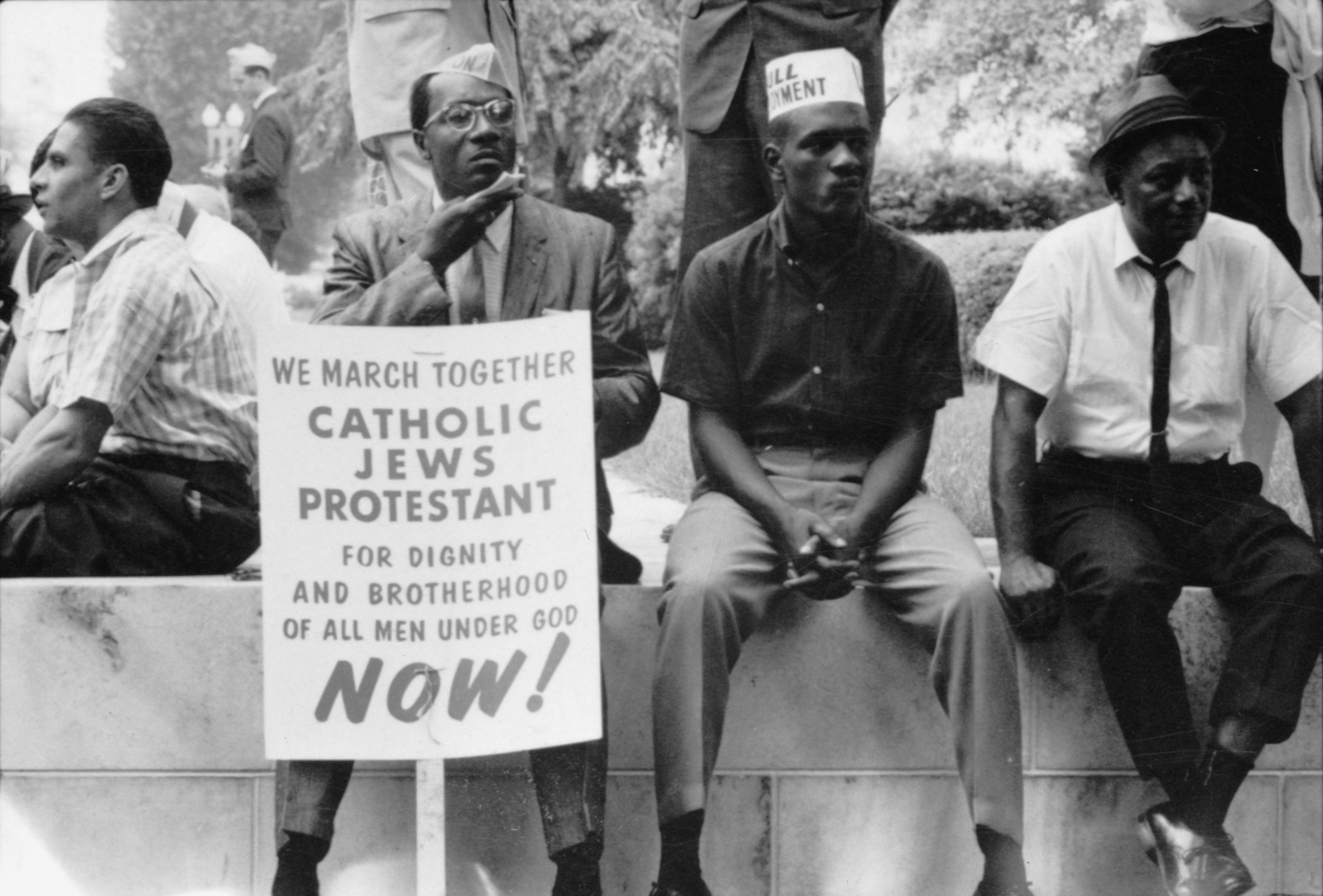
The civil rights march from Selma to Montgomery, Alabama, in 1965

In December 1964, King and the SCLC joined forces with the Student Nonviolent Coordinating Committee (SNCC) in Selma, Alabama, where the SNCC had been working on voter registration for several months. A local judge issued an injunction that barred any gathering of three or more people affiliated with the SNCC, SCLC, DCVL, or any of 41 named civil rights leaders. This injunction temporarily halted civil rights activity until King defied it by speaking at Brown Chapel on January 2, 1965. During the 1965 march to Montgomery, Alabama, violence by state police and others against the peaceful marchers resulted in much publicity, which made racism in Alabama visible nationwide.

Acting on James Bevel's call for a march from Selma to Montgomery, Bevel and other SCLC members, in partial collaboration with SNCC, attempted to organize a march to the state's capital. The first attempt to march on March 7, 1965, at which King was not present, was aborted because of mob and police violence against the demonstrators. This day has become known as Bloody Sunday and was a turning point in the effort to gain public support for the civil rights movement. It was the clearest demonstration up to that time of the dramatic potential of King and Bevel's nonviolence strategy.

On March 5, King met with officials in the Johnson Administration to request an injunction against any prosecution of the demonstrators. He did not attend the march due to church duties, but later wrote, "If I had any idea that the state troopers would use the kind of brutality they did, I would have felt compelled to give up my church duties altogether to lead the line." Footage of police brutality against the protesters was broadcast extensively and aroused public outrage.

King next attempted to organize a march for March 9. The SCLC petitioned for an injunction in federal court against Alabama; this was denied and the judge issued an order blocking the march until after a hearing. Nonetheless, King led marchers on March 9 to the Edmund Pettus Bridge in Selma, then held a prayer session before turning the marchers around and asking them to disperse so as not to violate the court order. The unexpected ending of this second march aroused the surprise and anger of many within the local movement. The march finally went ahead fully on March 25, 1965. At the conclusion of the march on the steps of the state capitol, King delivered a speech that became known as "How Long, Not Long". King stated that equal rights for African Americans could not be far away, "because the arc of the moral universe is long, but it bends toward justice" and "you shall reap what you sow". (Note: Though commonly attributed to King, this expression originated with 19th-century abolitionist Theodore Parker.)

=== Chicago open housing movement, 1966 ===
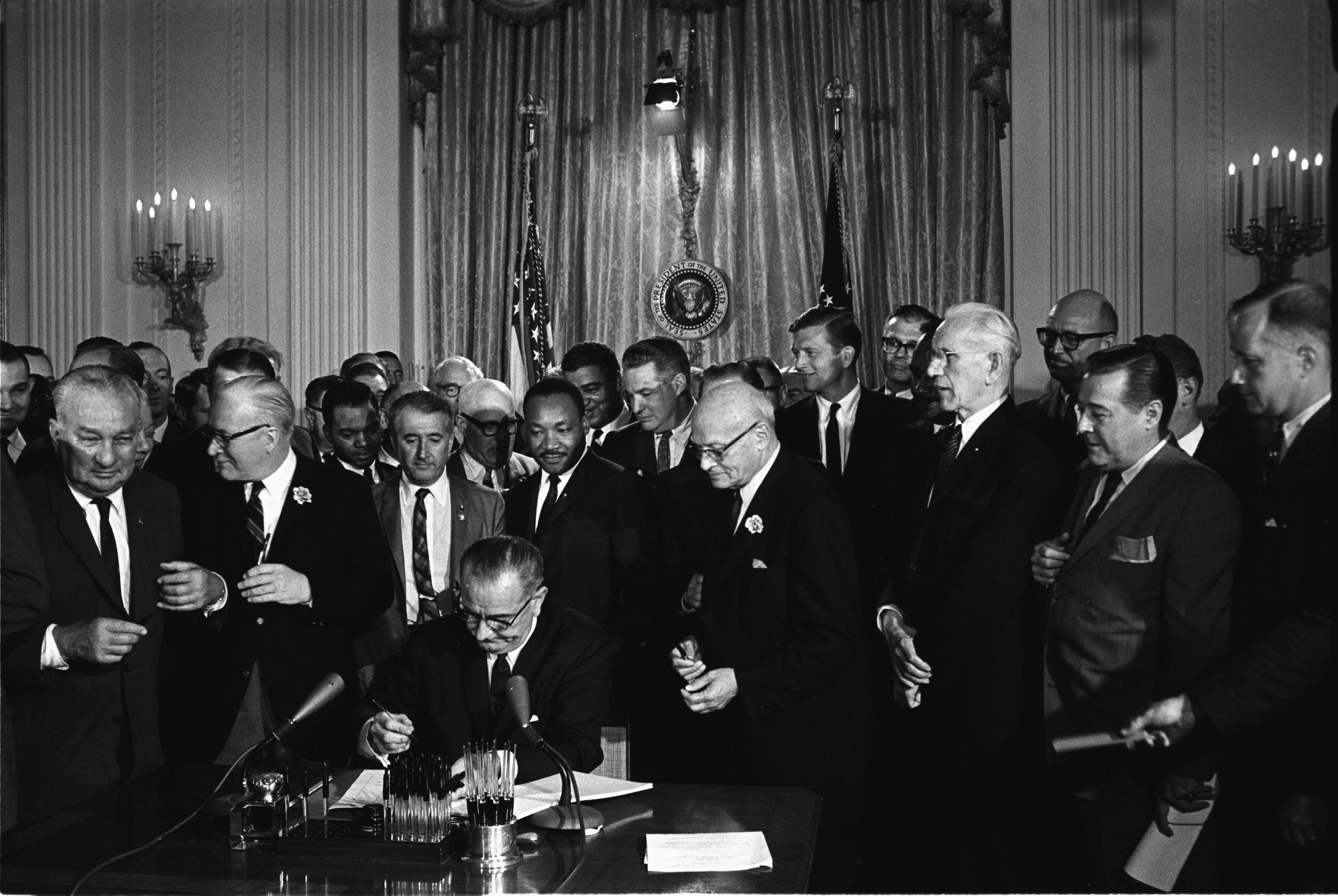
King standing behind President Johnson as he signs the Civil Rights Act of 1964

In 1966, after several successes in the south, King, Bevel, and others in the civil rights organizations took the movement to the North. King and Ralph Abernathy, both from the middle class, moved into a building at 1550 S. Hamlin Avenue, in the slums of North Lawndale on Chicago's West Side, as an educational experience and to demonstrate their support and empathy for the poor.

The SCLC formed a coalition with Coordinating Council of Community Organizations (CCCO), an organization founded by Albert Raby, and the combined organizations' efforts were fostered under the aegis of the Chicago Freedom Movement. During that spring, several white couple/black couple tests of real estate offices uncovered racial steering, discriminatory processing of housing requests by couples who were exact matches in income and background. Larger marches were planned and executed: in Bogan, Belmont Cragin, Jefferson Park, Evergreen Park, Gage Park, Marquette Park, and others.

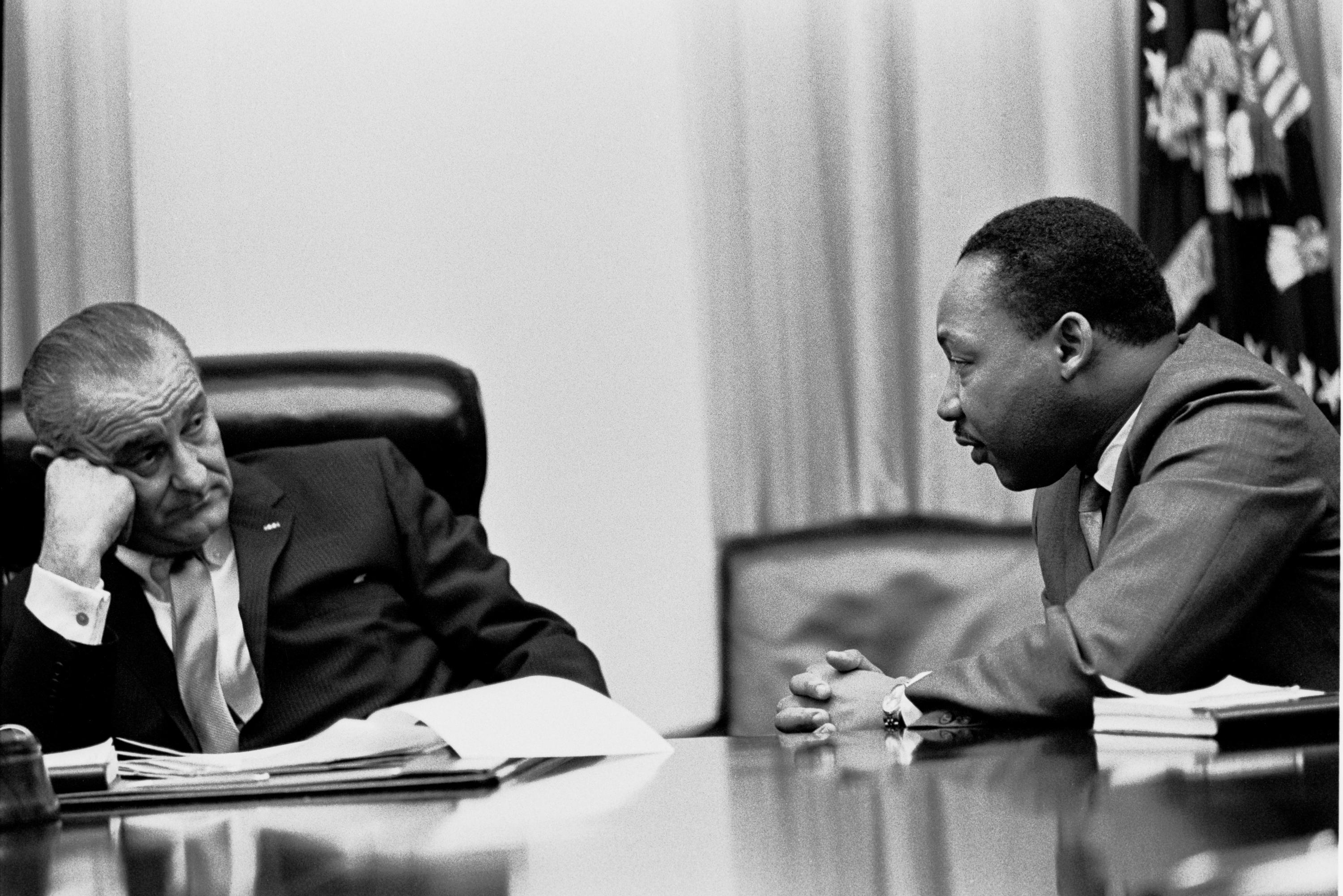
President Lyndon B. Johnson meeting with King in the White House Cabinet Room in 1966

King later stated and Abernathy wrote that the movement received a worse reception in Chicago than in the South. Marches, especially the one through Marquette Park on August 5, 1966, were met by thrown bottles and screaming throngs. Rioting seemed very possible. King's beliefs militated against his staging a violent event, and he negotiated an agreement with Mayor Richard J. Daley to cancel a march to avoid the violence he feared would result. King was hit by a brick during one march, but continued to lead marches in the face of personal danger.

When King and his allies returned to the South, they left Jesse Jackson, a seminary student who had previously joined the movement in the South, in charge of their organization. Jackson continued their struggle for civil rights by organizing the Operation Breadbasket movement that targeted chain stores that did not deal fairly with blacks. A 1967 CIA document declassified in 2017 downplayed King's role in the "black militant situation" in Chicago, with a source stating that King "sought at least constructive, positive projects."

=== Opposition to the Vietnam War ===
The black revolution is much more than a struggle for the rights of Negroes. It is forcing America to face all its interrelated flaws—racism, poverty, militarism, and materialism. It is exposing evils that are rooted deeply in the whole structure of our society. It reveals systemic rather than superficial flaws and suggests that radical reconstruction of society itself is the real issue to be faced.

— Martin Luther King Jr.

We must recognize that we can't solve our problem now until there is a radical redistribution of economic and political power... this means a revolution of values and other things. We must see now that the evils of racism, economic exploitation, and militarism are all tied together... you can't really get rid of one without getting rid of the others... the whole structure of American life must be changed. America is a hypocritical nation and [we] must put [our] own house in order.

— Martin Luther King Jr.

King was long opposed to American involvement in the Vietnam War, but at first avoided the topic in speeches to avoid interference with civil rights goals that criticism of President Johnson's policies might have created. At the urging of SCLC's former Director of Direct Action and now the head of the Spring Mobilization Committee to End the War in Vietnam, James Bevel, and inspired by the outspokenness of Muhammad Ali, King eventually agreed to publicly oppose the war, as opposition was growing among the public.

During an April 1967 appearance at the New York City Riverside Church, King delivered a speech titled "Beyond Vietnam: A Time to Break Silence". He spoke against America's role in the war, arguing the US was in Vietnam "to occupy it as an American colony" and calling the US government "the greatest purveyor of violence in the world today". He connected the war with economic injustice, arguing that the country needed serious moral change:

A true revolution of values will soon look uneasily on the glaring contrast of poverty and wealth. With righteous indignation, it will look across the seas and see individual capitalists of the West investing huge sums of money in Asia, Africa and South America, only to take the profits out with no concern for the social betterment of the countries, and say: "This is not just."

King opposed the war because it took resources away from social welfare at home: "A nation that continues year after year to spend more money on military defense than on programs of social uplift is approaching spiritual death." He stated that North Vietnam "did not begin to send in any large number of supplies or men until American forces had arrived in the tens of thousands", and accused the U.S. of having killed a million Vietnamese, "mostly children". King also criticized American opposition to North Vietnam's land reforms.

King's opposition cost him significant support among white allies including Johnson, Billy Graham, union leaders, and powerful publishers. "The press is being stacked against me", King said, complaining of what he described as a double standard that applauded his nonviolence at home, but deplored it when applied "toward little brown Vietnamese children". Life magazine called the speech "demagogic slander that sounded like a script for Radio Hanoi", and The Washington Post declared that King had "diminished his usefulness to his cause, his country, his people."

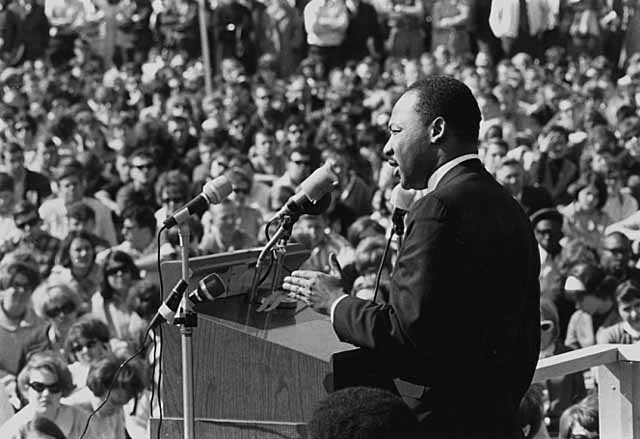
King speaking to an anti-Vietnam war rally at the University of Minnesota in St. Paul on April 27, 1967

The "Beyond Vietnam" speech reflected King's evolving political advocacy in his later years, which paralleled the teachings of the progressive Highlander Research and Education Center, with which he was affiliated. King began to speak of the need for fundamental changes in the American political and economic situation, and more frequently expressed his opposition to the war and his desire to see a redistribution of resources to correct injustice. He guarded his language in public to avoid being linked to communism, but in private sometimes spoke of his support for democratic socialism.

King stated in "Beyond Vietnam" that "true compassion is more than flinging a coin to a beggar ... it comes to see that an edifice which produces beggars needs restructuring." King quoted a US official who said that from Vietnam to Latin America, the country was "on the wrong side of a world revolution." King condemned America's "alliance with the landed gentry of Latin America", and said the US should support "the shirtless and barefoot people" in the Third World rather than suppressing their attempts at revolution.

King's stance on Vietnam encouraged Allard K. Lowenstein, William Sloane Coffin and Norman Thomas, with the support of anti-war Democrats, to attempt to persuade King to run against President Johnson in the 1968 presidential election. King contemplated but decided against this as he felt uneasy with politics and considered himself better suited to activism.

On April 15, 1967, King spoke at an anti-war march from Manhattan's Central Park to the UN. The march was organized by the Spring Mobilization Committee to End the War in Vietnam under chairman James Bevel. At the UN King brought up issues of civil rights and the draft:

I have not urged a mechanical fusion of the civil rights and peace movements. There are people who have come to see the moral imperative of equality, but who cannot yet see the moral imperative of world brotherhood. I would like to see the fervor of the civil-rights movement imbued into the peace movement to instill it with greater strength. And I believe everyone has a duty to be in both the civil-rights and peace movements. But for those who presently choose but one, I would hope they will finally come to see the moral roots common to both.

Seeing an opportunity to unite civil rights and anti-war activists, Bevel convinced King to become even more active in the anti-war effort. Despite his growing public opposition to the war, King was not fond of the hippie culture developed from the anti-war movement. In his 1967 Massey Lecture, King stated:

The importance of the hippies is not in their unconventional behavior, but in the fact that hundreds of thousands of young people, in turning to a flight from reality, are expressing a profoundly discrediting view on the society they emerge from.

On January 13, 1968, King called for a large march on Washington against "one of history's most cruel and senseless wars":

We need to make clear in this political year, to congressmen on both sides of the aisle and to the president of the United States, that we will no longer tolerate, we will no longer vote for men who continue to see the killings of Vietnamese and Americans as the best way of advancing the goals of freedom and self-determination in Southeast Asia.

==== Correspondence with Thích Nhất Hạnh ====
Thích Nhất Hạnh was an influential Vietnamese Buddhist who wrote a letter to King in 1965 entitled: "In Search of the Enemy of Man". It was during his 1966 stay in the US that Nhất Hạnh met with King and urged him to publicly denounce the war. On April 4, 1967, King gave a speech in New York City, his first to publicly question U.S. involvement in Vietnam. Later that year, King nominated Nhất Hạnh for the Nobel Peace Prize. In his nomination, King said, "I do not personally know of anyone more worthy of [this prize] than this gentle monk from Vietnam. His ideas for peace, if applied, would build a monument to ecumenism, to world brotherhood, to humanity".

=== Poor People's Campaign, 1968 ===
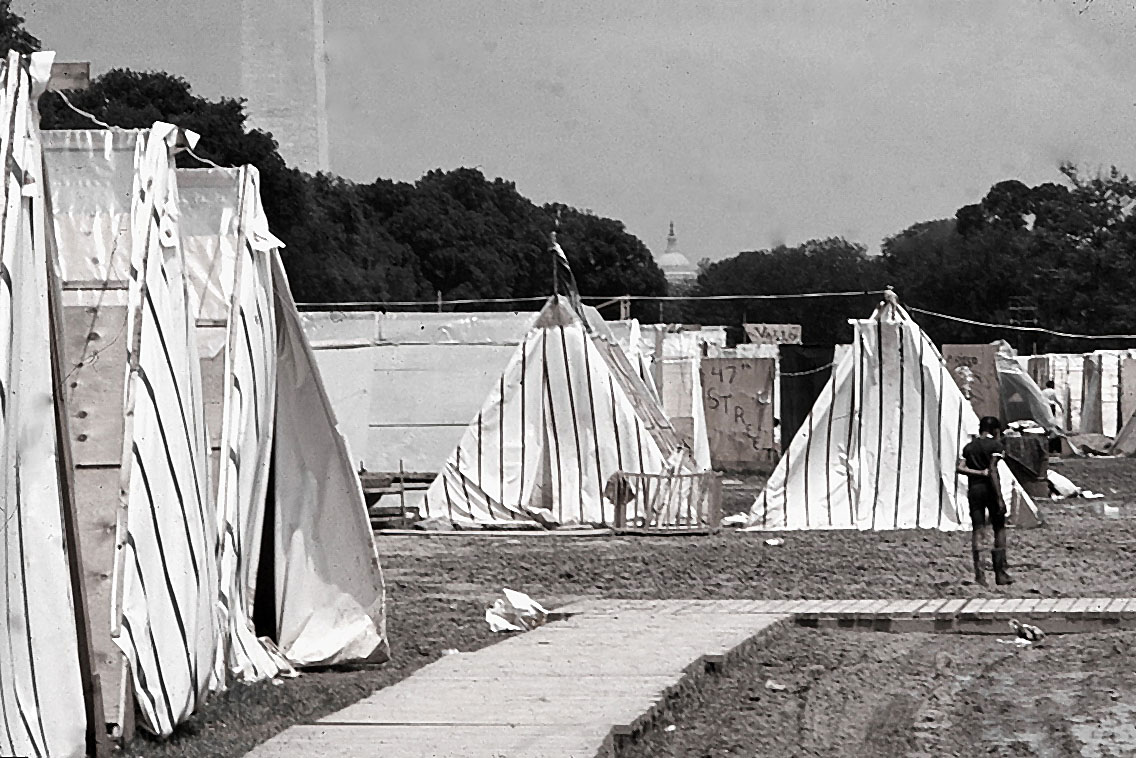
A shantytown established in Washington, D.C. to protest economic conditions as a part of the Poor People's Campaign

In 1968, King and the SCLC organized the "Poor People's Campaign" to address economic justice. King traveled the country to assemble "a multiracial army of the poor" that would march on Washington to engage in nonviolent civil disobedience at the Capitol until Congress created an "economic bill of rights".

The campaign was preceded by King's final book, Where Do We Go from Here: Chaos or Community? which laid out his view of how to address social issues and poverty. King quoted from Henry George's book Progress and Poverty, particularly in support of a guaranteed basic income. The campaign culminated in a march on Washington, D.C., demanding economic aid to the poorest communities of the U.S.

King and the SCLC called on the government to invest in rebuilding America's cities. He felt that Congress had shown "hostility to the poor" by spending "military funds with alacrity and generosity". He contrasted this with the situation faced by poor Americans, claiming that Congress had merely provided "poverty funds with miserliness". His vision was for change that was more revolutionary than mere reform: he cited systematic flaws of "racism, poverty, militarism and materialism", and argued that "reconstruction of society itself is the real issue to be faced."

The Poor People's Campaign was controversial even within the civil rights movement. Rustin resigned from the march, stating that the goals of the campaign were too broad, that its demands were unrealizable, and that he thought that these campaigns would accelerate repression on the poor and the black.

=== Global policy ===
King was one of the signatories of the agreement to convene a convention for drafting a world constitution. As a result, in 1968 a World Constituent Assembly convened to draft and adopt the Constitution for the Federation of Earth.

== Assassination and aftermath ==
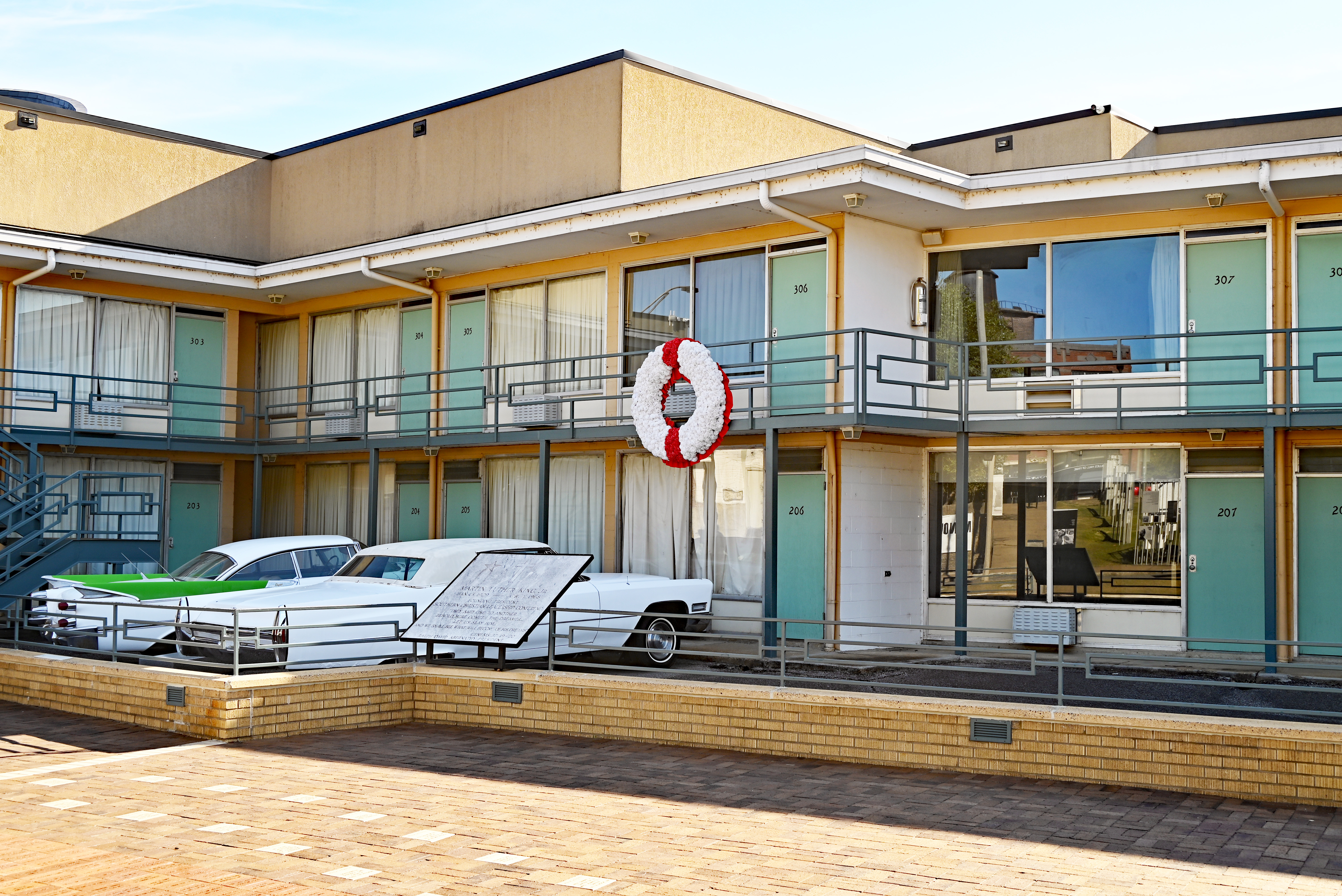
The Lorraine Motel, where King was assassinated, is now the site of the National Civil Rights Museum.

I've Been to the Mountaintop
Final 30 seconds of "I've Been to the Mountaintop" speech by Martin Luther King Jr.

On March 29, 1968, King went to Memphis, Tennessee, in support of the black sanitation workers, who were represented by American Federation of State, County and Municipal Employees (AFSCME) Local 1733. The workers had been on strike since March 12 for higher wages and better treatment. In one incident, black street repairmen received pay for two hours when they were sent home because of bad weather, but white employees were paid for the full day.

On April 3, King addressed a rally and delivered his "I've Been to the Mountaintop" address at Mason Temple. King's flight to Memphis had been delayed by a bomb threat against his plane. In reference to the bomb threat, King said:

And then I got to Memphis. And some began to say the threats, or talk about the threats that were out. What would happen to me from some of our sick white brothers? Well, I don't know what will happen now. We've got some difficult days ahead. But it doesn't matter with me now. Because I've been to the mountaintop. And I don't mind. Like anybody, I would like to live a long life. Longevity has its place. But I'm not concerned about that now. I just want to do God's will. And He's allowed me to go up to the mountain. And I've looked over. And I've seen the promised land. I may not get there with you. But I want you to know tonight, that we, as a people, will get to the promised land. So I'm happy, tonight. I'm not worried about anything. I'm not fearing any man. Mine eyes have seen the glory of the coming of the Lord.

King was booked in Room 306 at the Lorraine Motel in Memphis. Ralph Abernathy, who was present at the assassination, testified to the United States House Select Committee on Assassinations that King and his entourage stayed at Room 306 so often that it was known as the "King-Abernathy suite". According to Jesse Jackson, who was present, King's last words were spoken to musician Ben Branch, who was scheduled to perform that night at an event King was attending: "Ben, make sure you play 'Take My Hand, Precious Lord' in the meeting tonight. Play it real pretty."

King was fatally shot by James Earl Ray at 6:01 p.m., Thursday, April 4, 1968, as he stood on the motel's second-floor balcony. The bullet entered through his right cheek, smashing his jaw, then traveled down his spinal cord before lodging in his shoulder. Abernathy heard the shot from inside the motel room and ran to the balcony to find King on the floor.

After emergency surgery, King died at St. Joseph's Hospital at 7:05 p.m. According to biographer Taylor Branch, King's autopsy revealed that though only 39 years old, he "had the heart of a 60 year old", which Branch attributed to stress. King was initially interred in South View Cemetery in South Atlanta, but in 1977, his remains were transferred to a tomb on the site of the Martin Luther King Jr. National Historical Park.

=== Aftermath ===
The assassination led to race riots in Washington, D.C., Chicago, Baltimore, Louisville, Kansas City, and dozens of other cities. Presidential candidate Robert F. Kennedy was on his way to Indianapolis for a campaign rally when he was informed of King's death. He gave a short, improvised speech to the gathering of supporters informing them of the tragedy and urging them to continue King's ideal of nonviolence. The following day, he delivered a prepared response in Cleveland. James Farmer Jr. and other civil rights leaders also called for non-violent action, while the more militant Stokely Carmichael called for a more forceful response. The city of Memphis quickly settled the strike on terms favorable to the sanitation workers.

The plan to set up a shantytown in Washington, D.C., was carried out soon after the April 4 assassination. Criticism of King's plan was subdued in the wake of his death, and the SCLC received an unprecedented wave of donations to carry it out. The campaign officially began in Memphis, on May 2, at the hotel where King was murdered. Thousands of demonstrators arrived on the National Mall and stayed for six weeks, establishing a camp they called "Resurrection City".

President Johnson tried to quell the riots by making telephone calls to civil rights leaders, mayors and governors and told politicians that they should warn the police against the unwarranted use of force. "I'm not getting through," Johnson told his aides. "They're all holing up like generals in a dugout getting ready to watch a war." Johnson declared April 7 a national day of mourning for King. Vice President Hubert Humphrey attended King's funeral on behalf of the President, as there were fears that Johnson's presence might incite protests and perhaps violence. At his widow's request, King's last sermon at Ebenezer Baptist Church, given on February 4, 1968, was played at the funeral,

I'd like somebody to mention that day that Martin Luther King Jr. tried to give his life serving others. I'd like for somebody to say that day that Martin Luther King Jr. tried to love somebody. I want you to say that day that I tried to be right on the war question. I want you to be able to say that day that I did try to feed the hungry. I want you to be able to say that day that I did try in my life to clothe those who were naked. I want you to say on that day that I did try in my life to visit those who were in prison. And I want you to say that I tried to love and serve humanity. Yes, if you want to say that I was a drum major. Say that I was a drum major for justice. Say that I was a drum major for peace. I was a drum major for righteousness. And all of the other shallow things will not matter. I won't have any money to leave behind. I won't have the fine and luxurious things of life to leave behind. But I just want to leave a committed life behind.

His friend Mahalia Jackson sang his favorite hymn, "Take My Hand, Precious Lord", at the funeral. The assassination helped to spur the enactment of the Civil Rights Act of 1968. Two months after King's death, James Earl Ray—on the loose from a previous prison escape—was captured at London Heathrow Airport while trying to reach white-ruled Rhodesia on a false Canadian passport. He was using the alias Ramon George Sneyd. Ray was quickly extradited to Tennessee and charged with King's murder. He confessed on March 10, 1969, though he recanted this confession three days later. On the advice of his attorney Percy Foreman, Ray pleaded guilty to avoid the possibility of the death penalty. He was sentenced to a 99-year prison term. Ray later claimed a man he met in Montreal, Quebec, with the alias "Raoul" was involved and that the assassination was the result of a conspiracy. He spent the remainder of his life attempting, unsuccessfully, to withdraw his guilty plea and secure the trial he never had. Ray died in 1998 at age 70.

=== Allegations of conspiracy ===
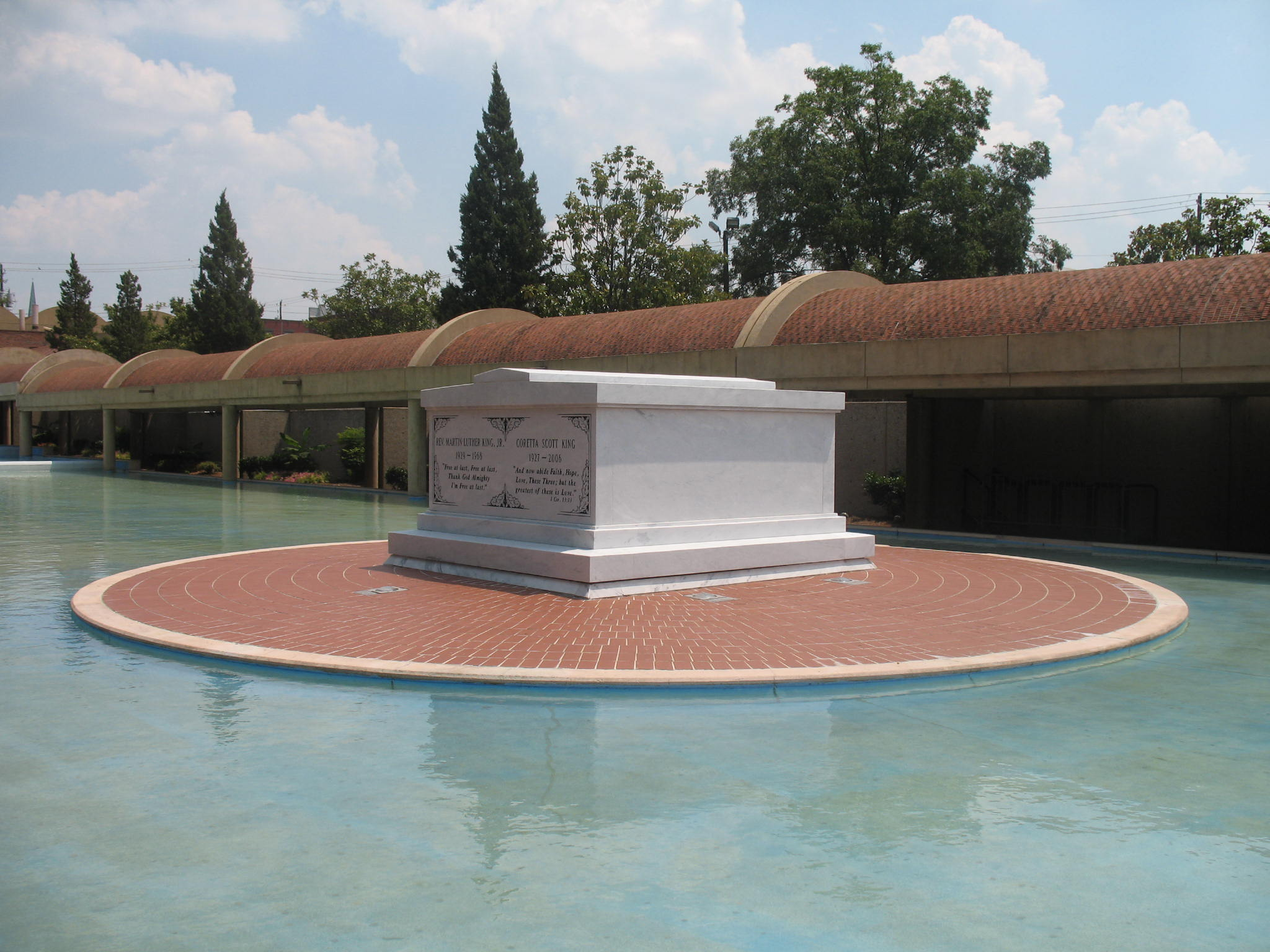
The sarcophagus for Martin Luther King Jr. and Coretta Scott King is within the Martin Luther King Jr. National Historical Park in Atlanta, Georgia.

Ray's lawyers maintained he was a scapegoat similar to the way that John F. Kennedy's assassin Lee Harvey Oswald is seen by conspiracy theorists. Supporters of this assertion said that Ray's confession was given under pressure and that he had been threatened with the death penalty. They admitted that Ray was a thief and burglar, but claimed that he had no record of committing violent crimes with a weapon. However, prison records in different U.S. cities have shown that he was incarcerated on numerous occasions for armed robbery. In a 2008 interview with CNN, Jerry Ray, the younger brother of James Earl Ray, claimed that James was smart and was sometimes able to get away with armed robbery. "I never been with nobody as bold as he is," Jerry said. "He just walked in and put that gun on somebody, it was just like it's an everyday thing."

Those suspecting a conspiracy point to the two successive ballistics tests which proved that a rifle similar to Ray's Remington Gamemaster had been the murder weapon. Those tests did not implicate Ray's specific rifle. Witnesses near King said that the shot came from another location, from behind thick shrubbery near the boarding house—which had been cut away in the days following the assassination—and not from the boarding house window. However, Ray's fingerprints were found on various objects in the bathroom where it was determined the gunfire came from. An examination of the rifle containing Ray's fingerprints determined that at least one shot was fired from the firearm at the time of the assassination.

In 1997, King's son Dexter Scott King met with Ray, and publicly supported Ray's efforts to obtain a new trial. Two years later, King's widow Coretta Scott King and the couple's children, represented by William F. Pepper, won a wrongful death claim against Loyd Jowers and "other unknown co-conspirators". Jowers claimed to have received $100,000 to arrange King's assassination. The jury found Jowers to be complicit in a conspiracy and that government agencies were party to the assassination.

In 2000, the U.S. Department of Justice completed the investigation into Jowers' claims but did not find evidence of conspiracy. The investigation report recommended no further investigation unless new reliable facts are presented. A sister of Jowers admitted that he had fabricated the story so he could make $300,000 from selling the story, and she corroborated his story to get money to pay her income tax.

In 2002, The New York Times reported that a church minister, Ronald Denton Wilson, claimed his father, Henry Clay Wilson, assassinated King. He stated, "It wasn't a racist thing; he thought Martin Luther King was connected with communism, and he wanted to get him out of the way." Wilson provided no evidence to back up his claims.

King researchers David Garrow and Gerald Posner disagreed with Pepper's claims that the government killed King. In 2003, Pepper published a book about the investigation and trial, as well as his representation of James Earl Ray in his bid for a trial. James Bevel also disputed the argument that Ray acted alone, stating, "There is no way a ten-cent white boy could develop a plan to kill a million-dollar black man." In 2004, Jesse Jackson stated:

The fact is there were saboteurs to disrupt the march. And within our own organization, we found a very key person who was on the government payroll. So infiltration within, saboteurs from without and the press attacks. ... I will never believe that James Earl Ray had the motive, the money and the mobility to have done it himself. Our government was very involved in setting the stage for and I think the escape route for James Earl Ray.

On January 23, 2025, President Donald Trump signed an Executive Order declassifying the records concerning the assassination.

== Legacy ==
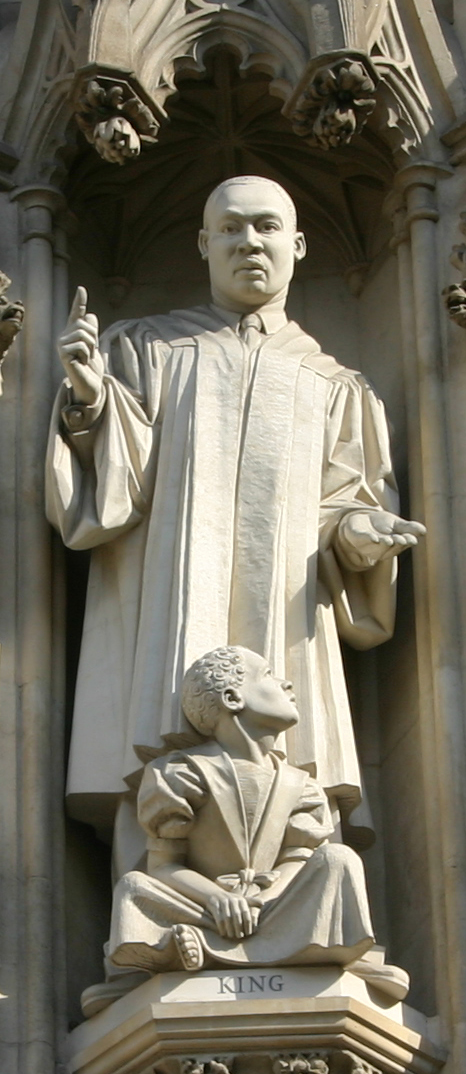
Martin Luther King Jr. statue over the west entrance of Westminster Abbey, installed in 1998

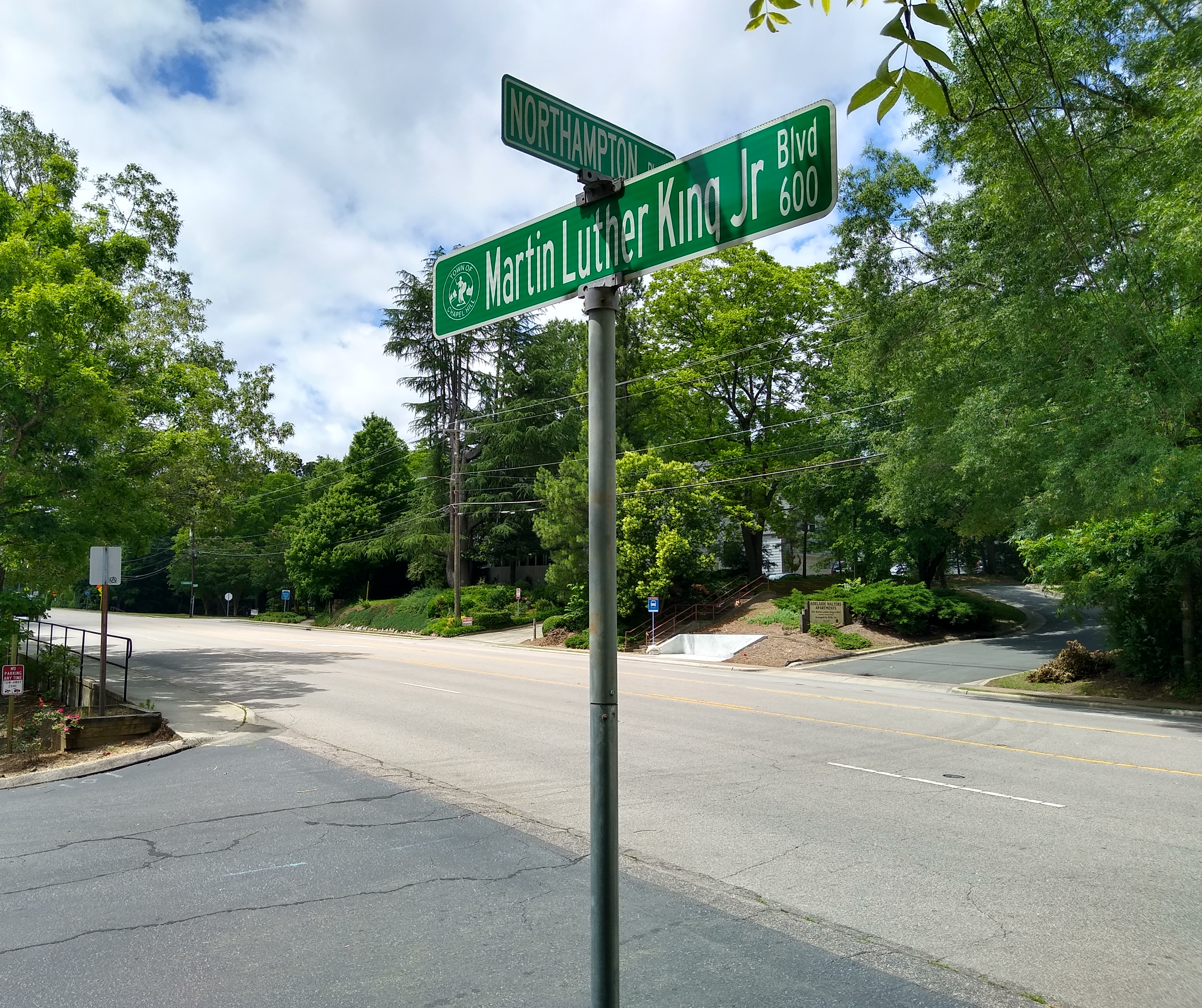
Martin Luther King Jr Blvd, in Chapel Hill, North Carolina

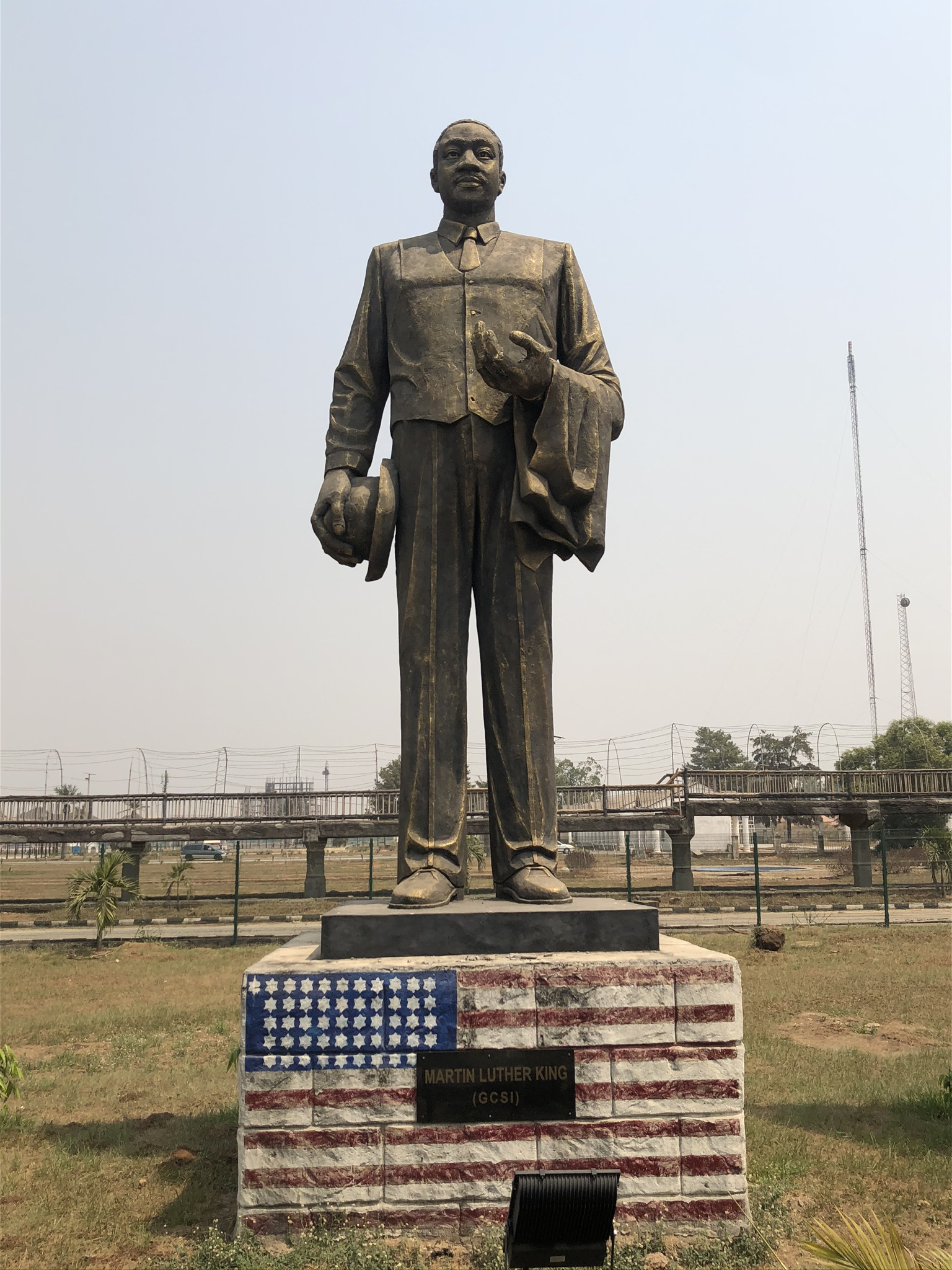
Martin Luther King Jnr. at The Heroes Square in Owerri, Imo State

=== South Africa ===
King's legacy includes influences on the Black Consciousness Movement and civil rights movement in South Africa. King's work was cited by, and served as, an inspiration for South African leader Albert Luthuli, who fought for racial justice in his country during apartheid and was later awarded the Nobel Peace Prize.

=== United Kingdom ===
John Hume, the former leader of the Social Democratic and Labour Party, cited King's legacy as quintessential to the Northern Ireland civil rights movement and the signing of the Good Friday Agreement, calling him "one of my great heroes of the century".

The Martin Luther King Fund and Foundation in the UK was set up as a charity on December 30, 1969, after King's assassination and following a visit to the UK in 1969 by his widow, Coretta King. The Foundation's first chairman, Canon John Collins, stated that the Foundation was to be an active UK national campaign for racial equality, its work also to include community projects in areas of social need, and education. International Personnel (IP), an employment agency, was formed in 1970 out of the foundation's base in Balham, to find employment for professionally qualified black people. In its first year, the agency placed ten percent of its applicants in jobs equal to their ability. The Balham Training Scheme operated an evening school with lecturers in Typing, Shorthand, English and Math. The foundation was removed from the Charity Commission list on November 18, 1996, as it had ceased to exist. The Northumbria and Newcastle Universities Martin Luther King Peace Committee still exists to honor King's legacy, as represented by his final visit to the UK to receive an honorary degree from Newcastle University in 1967. Northumbria and Newcastle remain centers for the study of Martin Luther King and the US civil rights movement. Inspired by King's vision, the committee undertakes a range of activities across the UK to "build cultures of peace".

In 2017, Newcastle University unveiled a bronze statue of King to celebrate the 50th anniversary of his honorary doctorate ceremony. The Students Union also voted to rename their bar "Luther's".

=== United States ===
King has become an icon in the history of American liberalism and American progressivism. His main legacy was to secure progress on civil rights in the U.S. Just days after King's assassination, Congress passed the Civil Rights Act of 1968. Title VIII of the Act, commonly known as the Fair Housing Act, prohibited discrimination in housing and housing-related transactions on the basis of race, religion, or national origin (later expanded to include sex, familial status, and disability). This legislation was seen as a tribute to King's struggle in his final years to combat residential discrimination. The day following King's assassination, teacher Jane Elliott conducted her first "Blue Eyes/Brown Eyes" exercise with her class of elementary school students to help them understand King's death as it related to racism.

King's wife Coretta Scott King was active in matters of social justice and civil rights until her death in 2006. The same year that King was assassinated, she established the King Center in Atlanta, Georgia, dedicated to preserving his legacy and the work of championing nonviolent conflict resolution and tolerance worldwide. Their son, Dexter King, who died in 2024, served as the center's chairman until 2010. In 2010, Martin Luther King III became president. In 2012, King's youngest child, Bernice King, became the CEO. Daughter Yolanda King, who died in 2007, was a motivational speaker, author and founder of Higher Ground Productions, an organization specializing in diversity training.

King family members disagree about his views about LGBTQ people. King's widow Coretta said that she believed her husband would have supported them. However, King's youngest child, Bernice, said that he would have been opposed to gay marriage. King himself, in a 1958 advice column written for Ebony, called homosexuality a "problem" and suggested that it could be resolved through psychiatric treatment.

==== Martin Luther King Jr. Day ====
Beginning in 1971, cities and states established annual holidays to honor King. On November 2, 1983, President Ronald Reagan signed a bill creating a federal holiday to honor King. Observed for the first time on January 20, 1986, it is called Martin Luther King Jr. Day. Following President George H. W. Bush's 1992 proclamation, the holiday is observed on the third Monday of January each year, near the time of King's birthday. On January 17, 2000, for the first time, Martin Luther King Jr. Day was officially observed in all fifty U.S. states. Arizona (1992), New Hampshire (1999) and Utah (2000) were the last states to recognize the holiday. Utah previously celebrated the holiday under the name Human Rights Day.

== Veneration ==
Martin Luther King of Georgia

Pastor and Martyr
- Honored in: Holy Christian Orthodox Church; Episcopal Church (United States); Evangelical Lutheran Church in America
- Canonized: September 9, 2016, The Christian Cathedral by Timothy Paul Baymon
- Feast: April 4 January 15 (Episcopalian and Lutheran)

King was canonized by Archbishop Timothy Paul of the Holy Christian Orthodox Church on September 9, 2016. His feast day was set as April 4, the date of his assassination. King is also honored with a Lesser Feast on the liturgical calendar of the Episcopal Church on April 4 or January 15, the anniversary of his birth. The Evangelical Lutheran Church in America commemorates King liturgically on January 15.

== Ideas, influences, and political stances ==
=== Christianity ===
As a Christian minister, King's main influence was Jesus Christ and the Christian gospels, which he frequently cited in his speeches. King's faith was strongly based in the Golden Rule, loving God above all, and loving your enemies. His nonviolent thought was also based in the injunction to turn the other cheek in the Sermon on the Mount, and Jesus' teaching of putting the sword back into its place (Matthew 26:52). In his Letter from Birmingham Jail, King urged action consistent with what he describes as Jesus' "extremist" love, and also quoted numerous other Christian pacifist authors. In another sermon, he stated:

Before I was a civil rights leader, I was a preacher of the Gospel. This was my first calling and it still remains my greatest commitment. You know, actually all that I do in civil rights I do because I consider it a part of my ministry. I have no other ambitions in life but to achieve excellence in the Christian ministry. I don't plan to run for any political office. I don't plan to do anything but remain a preacher. And what I'm doing in this struggle, along with many others, grows out of my feeling that the preacher must be concerned about the whole man.

King's private writings as an undergraduate in seminary show that he rejected biblical literalism; he described the Bible as "mythological", doubted that Jesus was born of a virgin and did not believe that the story of Jonah and the whale was true.

Among the thinkers who influenced King's theological outlook were L. Harold DeWolf, Edgar Brightman, Peter Bertocci, Walter George Muelder, Walter Rauschenbusch, and Reinhold Niebuhr.

==== The Measure of a Man ====
In 1959, King published a short book called The Measure of a Man, which contained his sermons "What is Man?" and "The Dimensions of a Complete Life". The sermons argued for man's need for God's love and criticized the racial injustices of Western civilization.

=== Nonviolence ===
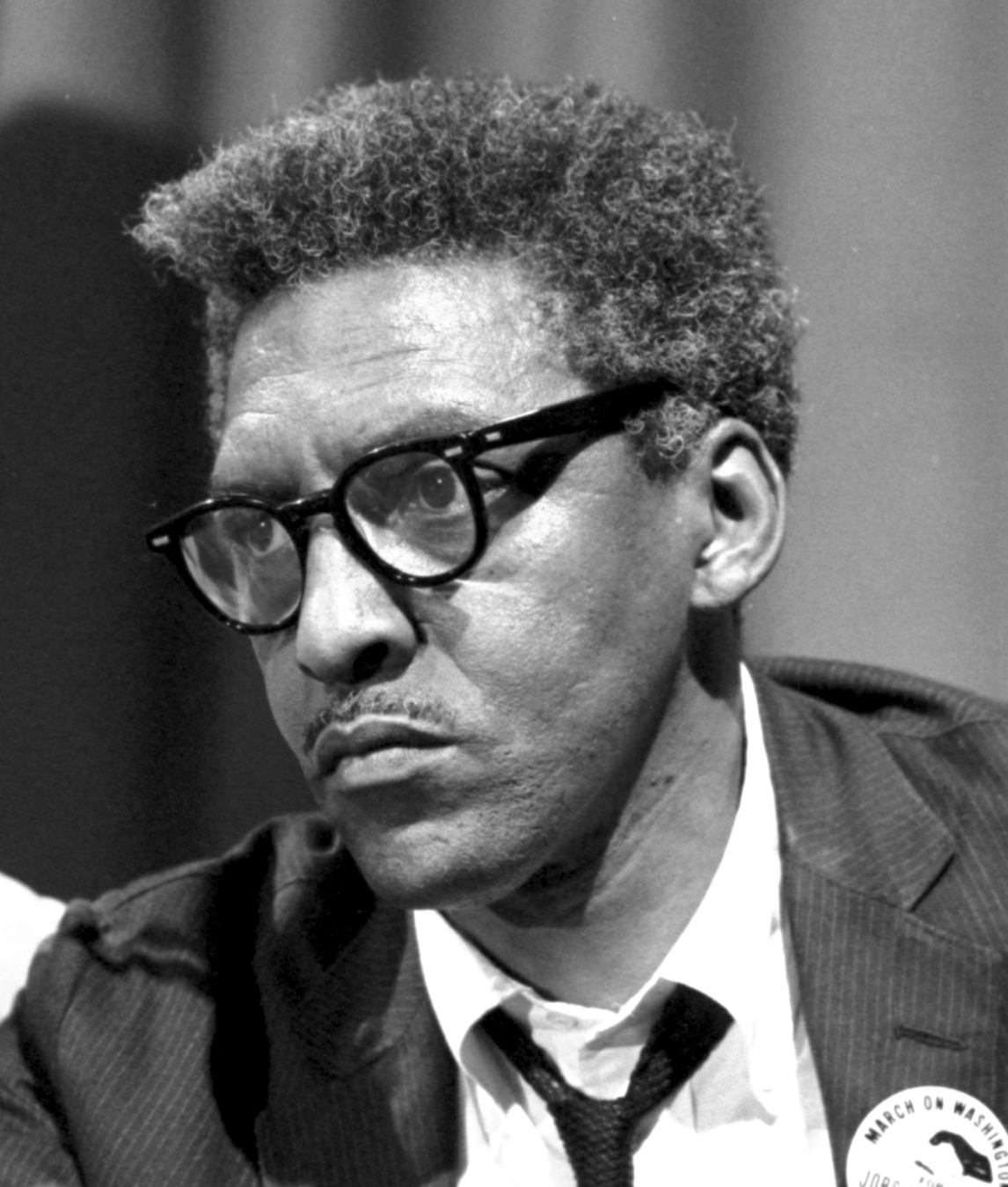
King worked alongside Quakers such as Bayard Rustin to develop nonviolent tactics.

World peace through nonviolent means is neither absurd nor unattainable. All other methods have failed. Thus we must begin anew. Nonviolence is a good starting point. Those of us who believe in this method can be voices of reason, sanity, and understanding amid the voices of violence, hatred, and emotion. We can very well set a mood of peace out of which a system of peace can be built.

— Martin Luther King Jr.

African-American civil rights activist Bayard Rustin was King's first regular advisor on nonviolence. King was also advised by the white activists Harris Wofford and Glenn Smiley. Rustin and Smiley came from the Christian pacifist tradition, and Wofford and Rustin both studied Mahatma Gandhi's teachings. Rustin had applied nonviolence with the Journey of Reconciliation campaign in the 1940s, and Wofford had been promoting Gandhism to Southern blacks since the early 1950s.

King initially knew little about Gandhi and rarely used the term "nonviolence" during his early activism. King initially believed in and practiced self-defense, even obtaining guns to defend against possible attackers. The pacifists showed him the alternative of nonviolent resistance, arguing that this would be a better means to accomplish his goals. King then vowed to no longer personally use arms.

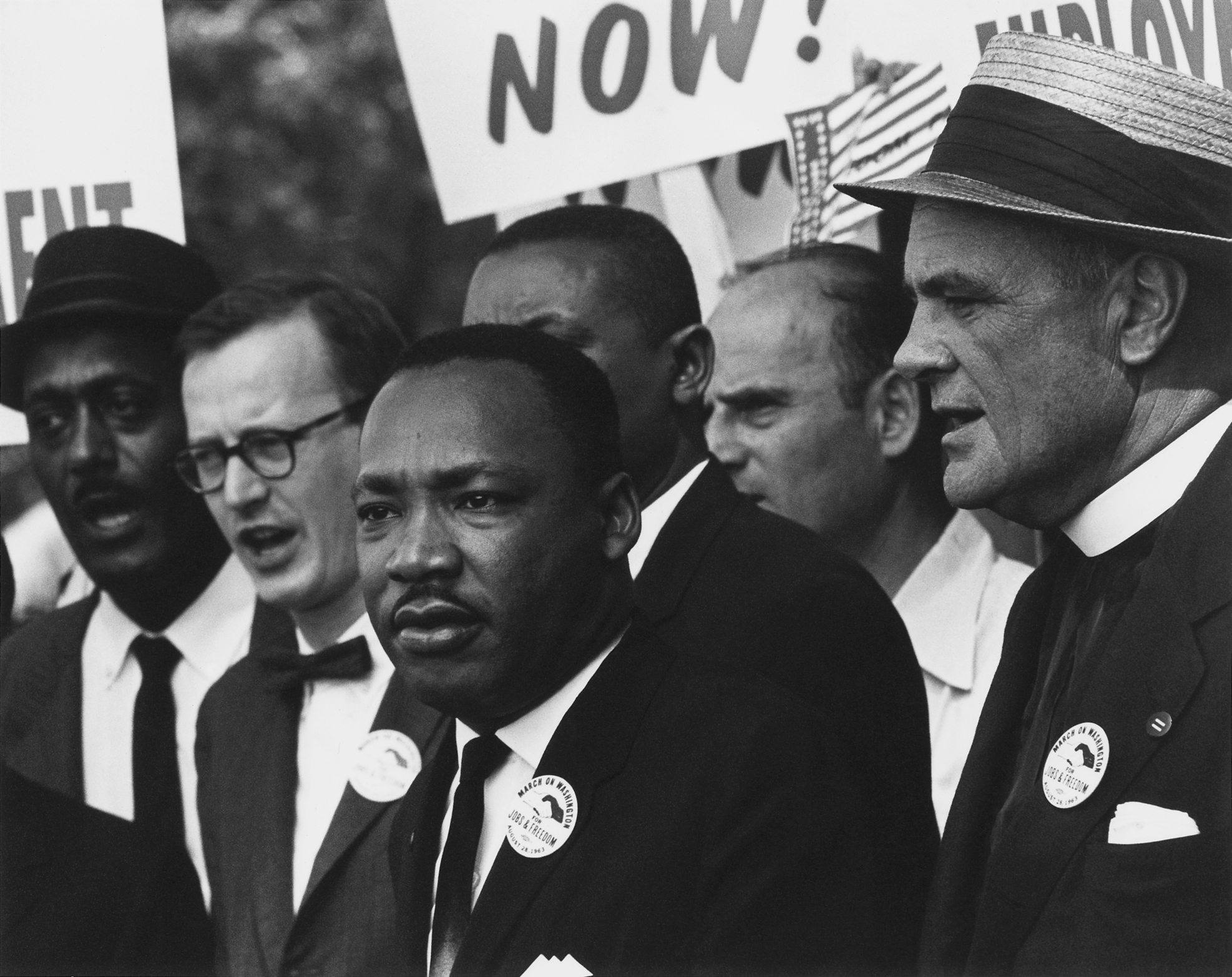
King at the 1963 Civil Rights March in Washington, D.C.

In a chapter of Stride Toward Freedom, King outlined his understanding of nonviolence, which seeks to win an opponent to friendship, rather than to humiliate or defeat him. The chapter draws from an address by Wofford, with Rustin and Stanley Levison also providing guidance and ghostwriting.

King was inspired by Gandhi and his success with nonviolent activism, and as a theology student, King described Gandhi as being one of the "individuals who greatly reveal the working of the Spirit of God". King had "for a long time ... wanted to take a trip to India." With assistance from Harris Wofford, the American Friends Service Committee, and other supporters, he was able to fund the journey in February 1959. The trip deepened his understanding of nonviolent resistance and his commitment to America's struggle for civil rights. In a radio address made during his final evening in India, King reflected, "Since being in India, I am more convinced than ever before that the method of nonviolent resistance is the most potent weapon available to oppressed people in their struggle for justice and human dignity."

When receiving the Nobel Peace Prize in 1964, King hailed the "successful precedent" of using nonviolence "by Mohandas K. Gandhi to challenge the might of the British Empire ... He struggled only with the weapons of truth, soul force, non-injury and courage." Another influence was Henry David Thoreau's essay On Civil Disobedience and its theme of refusing to cooperate with an evil system. He also was greatly influenced by the works of Protestant theologians Reinhold Niebuhr and Paul Tillich, and said that Walter Rauschenbusch's Christianity and the Social Crisis left an "indelible imprint" on his thinking by giving him a theological grounding for his social concerns. King was moved by Rauschenbusch's vision of Christians spreading social unrest in "perpetual but friendly conflict" with the state, simultaneously critiquing it and calling it to act as an instrument of justice. However, he was apparently unaware of the American tradition of Christian pacifism exemplified by Adin Ballou and William Lloyd Garrison. King frequently referred to Jesus' Sermon on the Mount as central for his work. Before 1960, King also sometimes used the concept of "agape" (brotherly Christian love).

Even after renouncing personal use of guns, King had a complex relationship with self-defense in the movement. He publicly discouraged it as a widespread practice but acknowledged that it was sometimes necessary. Throughout his career King was frequently protected by other civil rights activists who carried arms, such as Colonel Stone Johnson, Robert Hayling, and the Deacons for Defense and Justice.

Amid recurring riots in the mid-1960s, King reaffirmed his commitment to nonviolence. He stated that riots were "the language of the unheard", the result of a failure to improve economic conditions and address racial injustice, but condemned them as "self-defeating and socially destructive".

=== Criticism within the movement ===
King was criticized by other black leaders in the civil rights movement. This included more militant thinkers such as Nation of Islam member Malcolm X. Student Nonviolent Coordinating Committee founder Ella Baker regarded King as a charismatic media figure who lost touch with the grassroots of the movement as he became close to elite figures like Nelson Rockefeller. Stokely Carmichael, a protege of Baker's, became a black separatist and disagreed with King's plea for racial integration because he considered it an insult to a uniquely African-American culture. He also took issue that King's non-violence approach depended on appealing to America's conscience, feeling America had none to appeal to.

=== Activism and involvement with Native Americans ===
King was an avid supporter of Native American rights and Native Americans were active supporters of King's civil rights movement. The Native American Rights Fund (NARF) was patterned after the NAACP's Legal Defense and Education Fund. The National Indian Youth Council (NIYC) was especially supportive in King's campaigns especially the Poor People's Campaign in 1968. In King's book Why We Can't Wait he writes:

Our nation was born in genocide when it embraced the doctrine that the original American, the Indian, was an inferior race. Even before there were large numbers of Negroes on our shores, the scar of racial hatred had already disfigured colonial society. From the sixteenth century forward, blood flowed in battles over racial supremacy. We are perhaps the only nation which tried as a matter of national policy to wipe out its indigenous population. Moreover, we elevated that tragic experience into a noble crusade. Indeed, even today we have not permitted ourselves to reject or to feel remorse for this shameful episode. Our literature, our films, our drama, our folklore all exalt it.

In the late 1950s, the remaining Creek in Alabama were trying to completely desegregate schools. Light-complexioned Native children were allowed to ride buses to previously all-white schools, while dark-skinned Native children from the same band were barred from the same buses. Tribal leaders, hearing of King's desegregation campaign in Birmingham, contacted him for assistance. Through his intervention the problem was quickly resolved.

In September 1959, after giving a speech at the University of Arizona on the ideals of using nonviolent methods in creating social change, King stated his belief that one must not use force in this struggle "but match the violence of his opponents with his suffering." King then went to Southside Presbyterian, a predominantly Native American church, and was fascinated by their photos; he wanted to go to an Indian Reservation to meet the people so Casper Glenn took King to the Papago Indian Reservation. He met with all the tribal leaders, visited another Presbyterian church near the reservation, and preached there, attracting a Native American crowd. He later returned to Old Pueblo in March 1962 where he preached again to a Native American congregation. King would continue to attract the attention of Native Americans throughout the civil rights movement. During the 1963 March on Washington there was a sizable Native American contingent, including many from South Dakota and from the Navajo nation.

King was a major inspiration, along with the civil rights movement, of the Native American rights movement of the 1960s and many of its leaders. John Echohawk, a member of the Pawnee tribe who was the executive director and a founder of the Native American Rights Fund, stated:

Inspired by Dr. King, who was advancing the civil rights agenda of equality under the laws of this country, we thought that we could also use the laws to advance our Indianship, to live as tribes in our territories governed by our own laws under the principles of tribal sovereignty that had been with us ever since 1831. We believed that we could fight for a policy of self-determination that was consistent with U.S. law and that we could govern our own affairs, define our own ways and continue to survive in this society.

=== Politics ===
As the leader of the SCLC, King maintained a policy of not publicly endorsing a U.S. political party or candidate: "I feel someone must remain in the position of non-alignment, so that he can look objectively at both parties and be the conscience of both—not the servant or master of either." In a 1958 interview, he expressed his view that neither party was perfect, saying, "I don't think the Republican party is a party full of the almighty God nor is the Democratic party. They both have weaknesses ... And I'm not inextricably bound to either party." King praised Democratic senator Paul Douglas of Illinois as being the "greatest of all senators" because of his fierce advocacy for civil rights causes.

King critiqued both parties' performance on promoting racial equality:

Actually, the Negro has been betrayed by both the Republican and the Democratic party. The Democrats have betrayed him by capitulating to the whims and caprices of the Southern Dixiecrats. The Republicans have betrayed him by capitulating to the blatant hypocrisy of reactionary right-wing northern Republicans. And this coalition of southern Dixiecrats and right-wing reactionary northern Republicans defeats every bill and every move towards liberal legislation in the area of civil rights.

Although King never publicly supported a political party or candidate for president, in a letter to a civil rights supporter in October 1956 he said that he had not decided whether he would vote for Democrat Adlai Stevenson II or Republican Dwight D. Eisenhower at the 1956 presidential election, but that "In the past, I always voted the Democratic ticket." In his autobiography, King says that in 1960 he privately voted for Democratic candidate John F. Kennedy: "I felt that Kennedy would make the best president. I never came out with an endorsement. My father did, but I never made one." King adds that he likely would have made an exception to his non-endorsement policy for a second Kennedy term, saying "Had President Kennedy lived, I would probably have endorsed him in 1964."

In 1964, King urged his supporters "and all people of goodwill" to vote against Republican Senator Barry Goldwater for president, saying that his election "would be a tragedy, and certainly suicidal almost, for the nation and the world." King believed Robert F. Kennedy would make for a good president, but also believed that he wouldn't beat Johnson in the 1968 Democratic Party presidential primaries. He also expressed support for the possible presidential candidacies of Republicans Nelson Rockefeller, George Romney and Charles Percy.

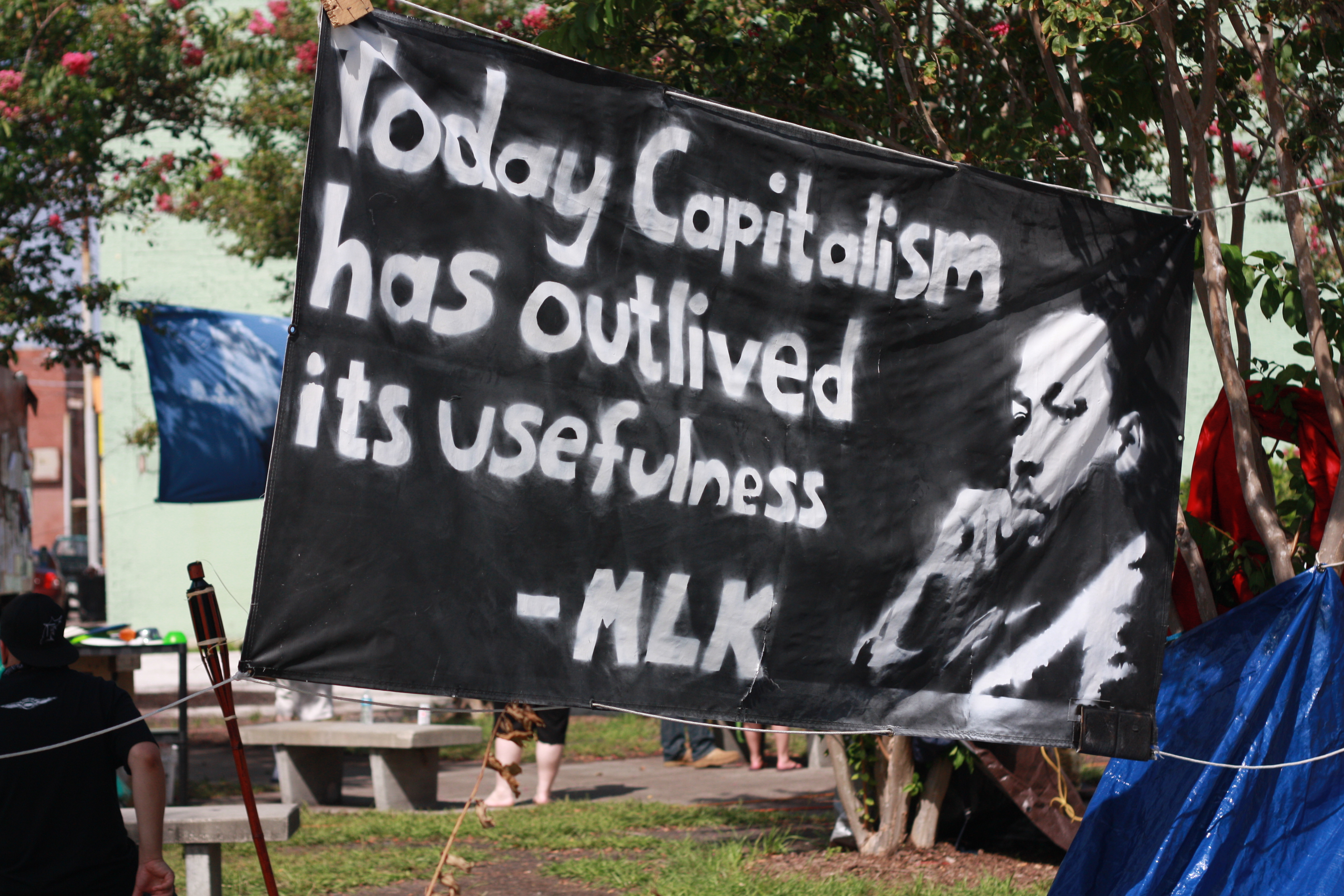
Banner at the 2012 Republican National Convention

King rejected both laissez-faire capitalism and communism; King had read Marx while at Morehouse but rejected communism because of its "materialistic interpretation of history" that denied religion, its "ethical relativism", and its "political totalitarianism". He stated that one focused too much on the individual while the other focused too much on the collective.

In a 1952 letter to Coretta Scott, he said: "I imagine you already know that I am much more socialistic in my economic theory than capitalistic ..." In one speech, he stated that "something is wrong with capitalism" and said, "There must be a better distribution of wealth, and maybe America must move toward a democratic socialism." King further said that "capitalism has outlived its usefulness" and "failed to meet the needs of the masses".

King was critical of American culture saying "when machines and computers, profit motives and property rights are considered more important than people, the giant triplets of racism, materialism and militarism are incapable of being conquered" and that America must undergo a "radical revolution of values". King considered that in America "the problem is that we all too often have socialism for the rich and rugged free enterprise capitalism for the poor". While supporting the Memphis sanitation strike he told a reporter that "in a sense you could say we are engaged in the class struggle."

=== Compensation ===
King stated that black Americans, as well as other disadvantaged Americans, should be compensated for historical wrongs. In an interview conducted for Playboy in 1965, he said that granting black Americans only equality could not realistically close the economic gap between them and whites. King said that he did not seek a full restitution of wages lost to slavery, which he believed impossible, but proposed a government compensatory program of $50 billion over ten years to all disadvantaged groups.

He posited that "the money spent would be more than amply justified by the benefits that would accrue to the nation through a spectacular decline in school dropouts, family breakups, crime rates, illegitimacy, swollen relief rolls, rioting and other social evils." He presented this idea as an application of the common law regarding settlement of unpaid labor but clarified that he felt that the money should not be spent exclusively on blacks. He stated, "It should benefit the disadvantaged of all races."

=== Television ===
Actress Nichelle Nichols planned to leave the science-fiction television series Star Trek in 1967 after its first season. She changed her mind after talking to King, who was a fan of the show. King explained that her character signified a future of greater racial cooperation. King told Nichols, "You are our image of where we're going, you're 300 years from now, and that means that's where we are and it takes place now. Keep doing what you're doing, you are our inspiration." As Nichols recounted:

Star Trek was one of the only shows that [King] and his wife Coretta would allow their little children to watch. And I thanked him and I told him I was leaving the show. All the smile came off his face. And he said, 'Don't you understand for the first time we're seen as we should be seen. You don't have a black role. You have an equal role.'

The series' creator, Gene Roddenberry, was deeply moved upon learning of King's support.

== State surveillance and coercion ==
=== FBI surveillance and wiretapping ===
Memo describing FBI attempts to disrupt the Poor People's Campaign with fraudulent claims about King‍—‌part of the COINTELPRO campaign against the anti-war and civil rights movements

FBI director J. Edgar Hoover personally ordered surveillance of King, with the intent to undermine his power as a civil rights leader. The Church Committee, a 1975 investigation by the U.S. Congress, found that "From December 1963 until his death in 1968, Martin Luther King Jr. was the target of an intensive campaign by the Federal Bureau of Investigation to 'neutralize' him as an effective civil rights leader."

In the fall of 1963, the FBI received authorization from Attorney General Robert F. Kennedy to proceed with wiretapping of King's phone lines, purportedly due to his association with Stanley Levison. The Bureau informed President John F. Kennedy. He and his brother unsuccessfully tried to persuade King to dissociate himself from Levison, a New York lawyer who had been involved with Communist Party USA. Although Robert Kennedy only gave written approval for limited wiretapping of King's telephone lines "on a trial basis, for a month or so", Hoover extended the clearance so his men were "unshackled" to look for evidence in any areas of King's life they deemed worthy.

The Bureau placed wiretaps on the home and office phone lines of both Levison and King, and bugged King's rooms in hotels as he traveled across the country. In 1967, Hoover listed the SCLC as a black nationalist hate group, with the instructions: "No opportunity should be missed to exploit through counterintelligence techniques the organizational and personal conflicts of the leaderships of the groups ... to insure [sic] the targeted group is disrupted, ridiculed, or discredited."

=== Police surveillance ===
King was also the subject of extensive surveillance by local police agencies throughout the United States. At the March on Washington, where King declared, "We can never be satisfied as long as the Negro is the victim of the unspeakable horrors of police brutality", undercover police from both the Birmingham Police Department and the Philadelphia Police Department were on hand to monitor the day's proceedings. Additional documented instances of local police that monitored King include the New York Police Department and the Chicago Police Department.

The Memphis Police Department also spied on King in the spring of 1968, as the civil rights leader was taking part in a campaign to support striking sanitation workers in the Tennessee city. A fire station was located across from the Lorraine Motel, next to the boarding house in which James Earl Ray was staying. Police officers were stationed in the fire station to keep King under surveillance. Agents were watching King at the time he was shot. Immediately following the shooting, officers rushed to the motel. Marrell McCollough, an undercover police officer, was the first person to administer first aid to King. The antagonism between King and the FBI, the lack of an all points bulletin to find the killer, and the police presence nearby led to speculation that the FBI was involved in the assassination.

=== NSA monitoring of King's communications ===
In a secret operation code-named "Minaret", the National Security Agency monitored the communications of leading Americans, including King, who were critical of the U.S. war in Vietnam. A review by the NSA itself concluded that Minaret was "disreputable if not outright illegal".

=== Allegations of communism ===
For years, Hoover had been suspicious of potential influence of communists in social movements such as labor unions and civil rights. Hoover directed the FBI to track King in 1957, and the SCLC when it was established.

Due to the relationship between King and Stanley Levison, the FBI feared Levison was working as an "agent of influence" over King, in spite of its own reports in 1963 that Levison had left the Party and was no longer associated in business dealings with them. Another King lieutenant, Jack O'Dell, was also linked to the Communist Party by sworn testimony before the House Un-American Activities Committee (HUAC).

Despite the extensive surveillance, by 1976 the FBI had acknowledged that it had not obtained any evidence that King himself or the SCLC were actually involved with any communist organizations.

For his part, King adamantly denied having any connections to communism. In a 1965 Playboy interview, he stated that "there are as many Communists in this freedom movement as there are Eskimos in Florida." He argued that Hoover was "following the path of appeasement of political powers in the South" and that his concern for communist infiltration of the civil rights movement was meant to "aid and abet the salacious claims of southern racists and the extreme right-wing elements." Hoover replied by saying that King was "the most notorious liar in the country". After his "I Have A Dream" speech, the FBI described King as "the most dangerous and effective Negro leader in the country". It alleged that he was "knowingly, willingly and regularly cooperating with and taking guidance from communists."

The attempts to prove that King was a communist were related to the feeling of many segregationists that blacks in the South were content with the status quo but had been stirred up by "communists" and "outside agitators". King said that "the Negro revolution is a genuine revolution, born from the same womb that produces all massive social upheavals—the womb of intolerable conditions and unendurable situations."

=== CIA surveillance ===
CIA files declassified in 2017 revealed that the agency was investigating possible links between King and Communism after a Washington Post article dated November 4, 1964, claimed he was invited to the Soviet Union and that Ralph Abernathy, as spokesman for King, refused to comment on the source of the invitation. Mail belonging to King and other civil rights activists was intercepted by the CIA program HTLINGUAL.

=== Allegations of adultery ===
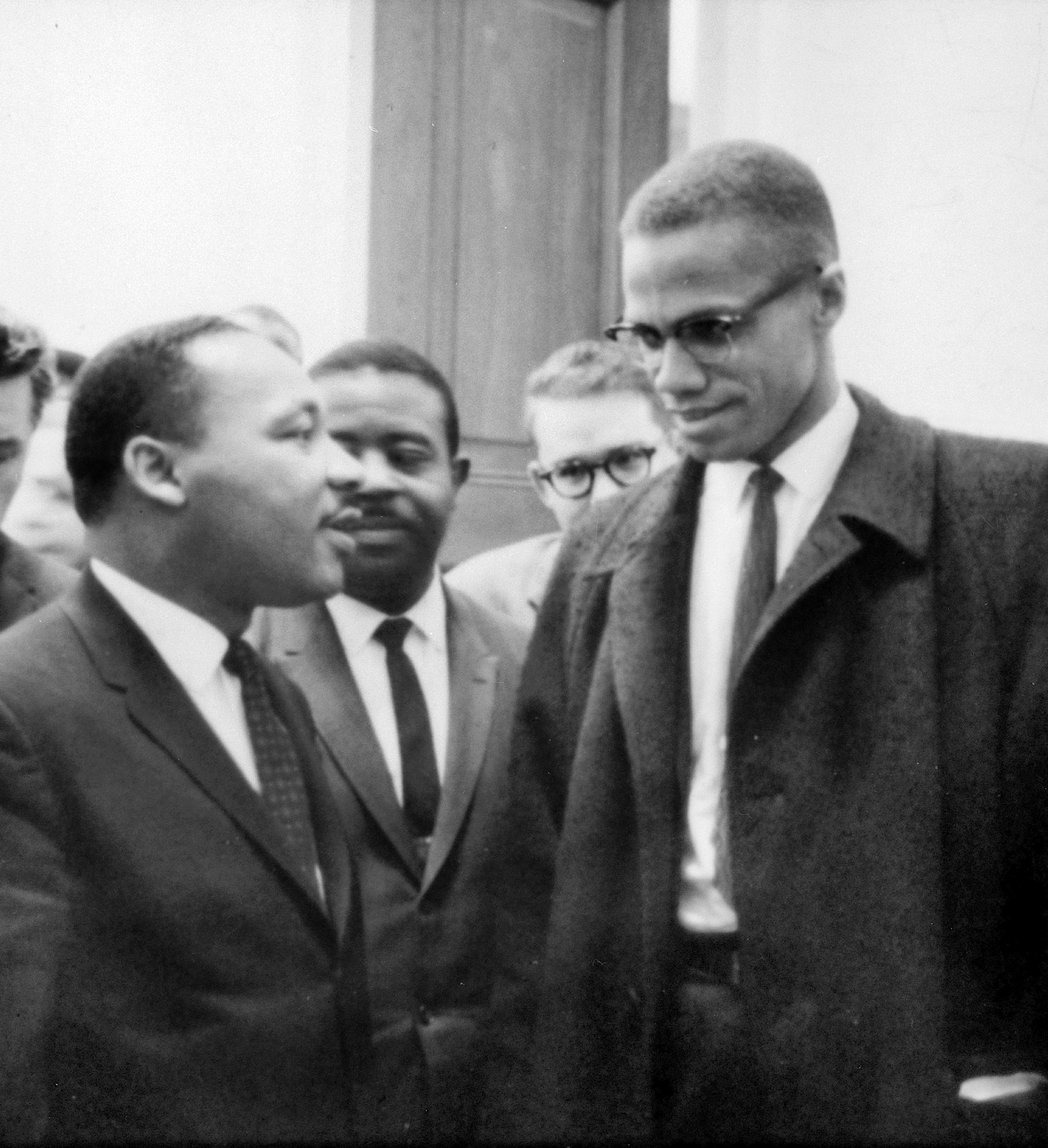
The only meeting of King and Malcolm X, outside the United States Senate chamber, March 26, 1964, during the Senate debates regarding the (eventual) Civil Rights Act of 1964

The FBI attempted to discredit King through revelations regarding his private life. FBI surveillance, some of it since made public, attempted to demonstrate that he had extramarital affairs. The FBI distributed reports regarding such affairs to the executive branch, friendly reporters, potential coalition partners and funding sources of the SCLC, and King's family. The bureau sent anonymous letters to King threatening to reveal information about his affairs. The FBI–King letter sent to King just before he received the Nobel Peace Prize read, in part:

Part of the FBI–King letter, mailed anonymously by the FBI. Other portions of the letter which were previously not made public would be uncovered in 2014.

The American public, the church organizations that have been helping—Protestants, Catholics and Jews will know you for what you are—an evil beast. So will others who have backed you. You are done. King, there is only one thing left for you to do. You know what it is. You have just 34 days in which to do (this exact number has been selected for a specific reason, it has definite practical significant [sic]). You are done. There is but one way out for you. You better take it before your filthy fraudulent self is bared to the nation.

The letter was accompanied by a tape recording—excerpted from FBI wiretaps—of several of King's extramarital liaisons. King interpreted this package as an attempt to drive him to suicide, although William Sullivan, then head of the Domestic Intelligence Division, argued it may have only been intended to "convince Dr. King to resign from the SCLC." Upon the release of the full letter in 2014, Yale history professor Beverly Gage noted in a New York Times article that the claim that the FBI "simply meant to push King out, not induce suicide" was a possibility, pointing out that "Another uncovered portion of the note praises "older leaders" like the NAACP executive director Roy Wilkins, urging King to step aside and let other men lead the civil rights movement." King refused to succumb to the FBI's threats.

In 1977, district court judge John Lewis Smith Jr. ordered the recorded audiotapes and written transcripts resulting from the FBI's electronic surveillance of King between 1963-68 to be sealed from public access in the National Archives until 2027. In 2019, an FBI file emerged on which a handwritten note alleged that King "looked on, laughed and offered advice" as one of his friends raped a woman. Historians who have examined this notional evidence have dismissed it as highly unreliable, as an uncorroborated FBI report during a period when it was undertaking an operation to attempt to discredit King. The tapes that could confirm or refute the allegation are scheduled to be declassified in 2027.

In his 1989 autobiography And the Walls Came Tumbling Down, Ralph Abernathy stated that King had a "weakness for women", although they "all understood and believed in the biblical prohibition against sex outside of marriage. It was just that he had a particularly difficult time with that temptation." In a later interview, Abernathy said he only wrote the term "womanizing", that he did not specifically say King had extramarital sex and that the infidelities were emotional rather than sexual. Abernathy criticized the media for sensationalizing the statements he wrote about King's affairs, such as the allegation King had a sexual affair the night before he was assassinated. In his 1986 book Bearing the Cross, Garrow wrote about affairs, including one woman King saw almost daily. According to Garrow, "that relationship ... increasingly became the emotional centerpiece of King's life, but it did not eliminate the incidental couplings ... of King's travels." He alleged that King explained his affairs as "a form of anxiety reduction". Garrow asserted that King's supposed promiscuity caused him "painful and at times overwhelming guilt". King's wife, Coretta, appeared to have accepted his affairs with equanimity, saying once that "all that other business just doesn't have a place in the very high-level relationship we enjoyed." Shortly after Bearing the Cross was released, civil rights author Howell Raines gave the book a positive review but opined that Garrow's allegations about King's sex life were "sensational" and stated that Garrow was "amassing facts rather than analyzing them".

== Awards and recognition ==
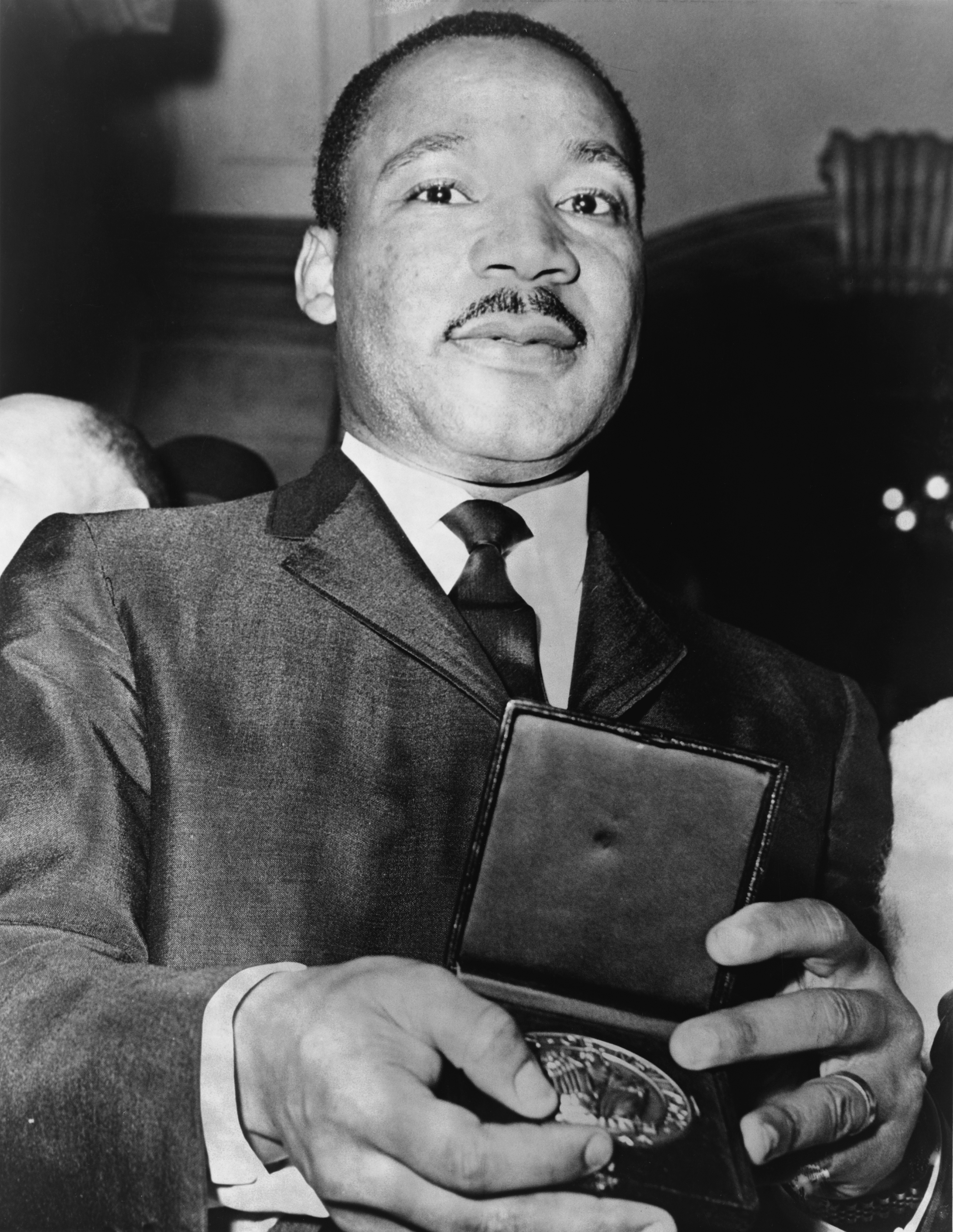
King showing his medallion, which he received from Mayor Wagner, 1964

King was awarded at least fifty honorary degrees from colleges and universities. On October 14, 1964, King became the youngest winner of the Nobel Peace Prize, which was awarded to him for leading nonviolent resistance to racial prejudice in the U.S. In 1965, he was awarded the American Liberties Medallion by the American Jewish Committee for his "exceptional advancement of the principles of human liberty." In his acceptance remarks, King said, "Freedom is one thing. You have it all or you are not free."

In 1957, he was awarded the Spingarn Medal from the NAACP. Two years later, he won the Anisfield-Wolf Book Award for Stride Toward Freedom: The Montgomery Story. In 1966, the Planned Parenthood Federation of America awarded King the Margaret Sanger Award for "his courageous resistance to bigotry and his lifelong dedication to the advancement of social justice and human dignity." Also in 1966, King was elected as a fellow of the American Academy of Arts and Sciences. In November 1967, he made a 24-hour trip to the UK to receive an honorary Doctorate in Civil Law from Newcastle University, becoming the first African American the institution had recognized in this way. In an impromptu acceptance speech, he said:

There are three urgent and indeed great problems that we face not only in the United States of America but all over the world today. That is the problem of racism, the problem of poverty and the problem of war.

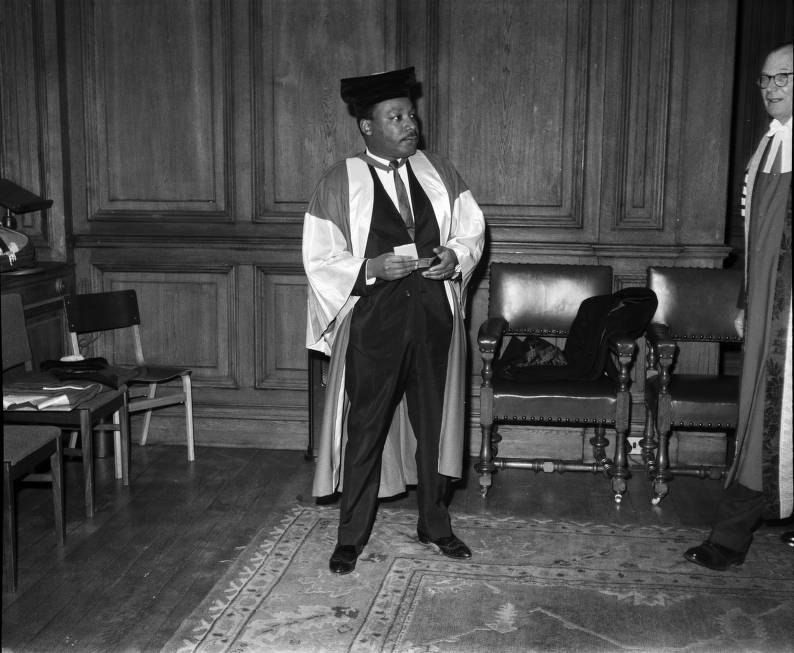
King after receiving his honorary doctorate from Newcastle University

In addition to his nominations for three Grammy Awards, King posthumously won for Best Spoken Word Recording in 1971 for "Why I Oppose The War In Vietnam".

In 1977, President Jimmy Carter posthumously awarded the Presidential Medal of Freedom to King. The citation read:

Martin Luther King Jr. was the conscience of his generation. He gazed upon the great wall of segregation and saw that the power of love could bring it down. From the pain and exhaustion of his fight to fulfill the promises of our founding fathers for our humblest citizens, he wrung his eloquent statement of his dream for America. He made our nation stronger because he made it better. His dream sustains us yet.

King and his wife were also awarded the Congressional Gold Medal in 2004.

King was second in Gallup's List of Most Widely Admired People of the 20th Century. In 1963, he was named Time Person of the Year, and, in 2000, he was voted sixth in an online "Person of the Century" poll by the same magazine. King placed third in The Greatest American conducted by the Discovery Channel and AOL.

=== Five-dollar bill ===
On April 20, 2016, Treasury Secretary Jacob Lew announced that the $5, $10, and $20 bills would all undergo redesign prior to 2020. Lew said that while Lincoln would remain on the front of the $5 bill, the reverse would be redesigned to depict various historical events that had occurred at the Lincoln Memorial. Among the planned designs are images from King's "I Have a Dream" speech.

=== Memorials ===
Many memorial sites, buildings and sculptures have been created to honor Martin Luther King Jr, including the Martin Luther King Jr. Memorial Library in Washington, D.C., the Dr. Martin Luther King Jr. Library in San Jose, California, and the Martin Luther King Jr. Memorial in West Potomac Park next to the National Mall in Washington, D.C.

=== Honorary doctorates ===
King has received several honorary doctorates.

- 1957: Doctor of Humane Letters, Morehouse College; Doctor of Laws, Howard University; Doctor of Divinity, Chicago Theological Seminary
- 1958: Doctor of Laws, Morgan State College; Doctor of Humanities, Central State College
- 1959: Doctor of Divinity, Boston University
- 1961: Doctor of Laws, Lincoln University; Doctor of Laws, University of Bridgeport
- 1962: Doctor of Civil Laws, Bard College
- 1963: Doctor of Letters, Keuka College
- 1964: Doctor of Divinity, Wesleyan College; Doctor of Laws, Jewish Theological Seminary; Doctor of Laws, Yale University; Doctor of Divinity, Springfield College
- 1965: Doctor of Laws, Hofstra University; Doctor of Humane Letters, Oberlin College; Doctor of Social Science, Amsterdam Free University; Doctor of Divinity, St. Peter's College
- 1967: Doctor of Civil Law, University of Newcastle upon Tyne; Doctor of Laws, Grinnell College

== Works ==
- Stride Toward Freedom: The Montgomery Story (1958) ISBN 978-0-06-250490-6
- The Measure of a Man (1959) ISBN 978-0-8006-0877-4
- Strength to Love (1963) ISBN 978-0-8006-9740-2
- Why We Can't Wait (1964) ISBN 978-0-8070-0112-7
- Where Do We Go from Here: Chaos or Community? (1967) ISBN 978-0-8070-0571-2
- The Trumpet of Conscience (1968) ISBN 978-0-8070-0170-7
- A Testament of Hope: The Essential Writings and Speeches of Martin Luther King Jr. (1986) ISBN 978-0-06-250931-4
- The Autobiography of Martin Luther King Jr. (1998), ed. Clayborne Carson ISBN 978-0-446-67650-2
- "All Labor Has Dignity" (2011) ed. Michael Honey ISBN 978-0-8070-8600-1
- "Thou, Dear God": Prayers That Open Hearts and Spirits. Collection of King's prayers. (2011), ed. Lewis Baldwin ISBN 978-0-8070-8603-2
- MLK: A Celebration in Word and Image (2011). Photographed by Bob Adelman, introduced by Charles Johnson ISBN 978-0-8070-0316-9

== Discography ==
=== Albums ===
Charted albums by Martin Luther King Jr.
| Title | Year | Peak |
| Title | Year | US |
|---|---|---|
| The Great March to Freedom | 1963 | 141 |
| The March on Washington | 1963 | 102 |
| Freedom March on Washington | 1963 | 119 |
| I Have a Dream | 1968 | 69 |
| The American Dream | 1968 | 173 |
| In Search of Freedom | 1968 | 150 |
| In the Struggle for Freedom and Human Dignity | 1968 | 154 |

=== Singles ===
Charted singles by Martin Luther King Jr.
| Title | Year | Peak | Album |
| Title | Year | US | Album |
|---|---|---|---|
| "I Have a Dream" (Gordy 7023 – b/w We Shall Overcome, Liz Lands) | 1968 | 88 | I Have a Dream (1968) |

== See also ==
- African American founding fathers of the United States – Activists for legal equality and human liberty
- Civil rights movement – 1954–1968 U.S. social movement
- Civil rights movement in popular culture
- Equality before the law – Judicial principle
- List of civil rights leaders
- List of peace activists
- List of streets named after Martin Luther King Jr.
- Martin Luther King Jr. Day – U.S. holiday, 3rd Monday of January
- Memorials to Martin Luther King Jr.
- Sermons and speeches of Martin Luther King Jr.
- Violence begets violence – Aphorism used by Martin Luther King Jr.

Awards and achievements
| Preceded by International Committee of the Red Cross and League of Red Cross Societies | Nobel Peace Prize Laureate; 1964 | Succeeded by UNICEF |
