= King (miniseries) =

- DVD cover
- Written by: Abby Mann
- Directed by: Abby Mann
- Starring: Paul Winfield; Cicely Tyson
- Music by: Billy Goldenberg
- Country of origin: United States
- Original language: English
- No. of episodes: 3

Production
- Executive producer: Edward S. Feldman
- Producer: Paul Maslansky
- Cinematography: Michael Chapman
- Editors: Byron "Buzz" Brandt; Rich Meyer; David Berlatsky
- Running time: 300 minutes

Original release
- Network: NBC
- Release: February 12 – February 14, 1978

King is a 1978 American television miniseries written and directed by Abby Mann, based on the life of Martin Luther King Jr., the American civil rights leader. It aired for three consecutive nights on NBC from February 12 through 14, 1978.

The miniseries earned nine Emmy Award nominations, including nominations for actors Paul Winfield, Cicely Tyson and Ossie Davis.

== Production ==
Several real-life figures from the Civil Rights Movement had minor roles in the production, including then-Atlanta mayor Maynard Jackson, King's sister Christine King Farris, his niece Alveda King, and his four children: Yolanda, Martin III, Dexter and Bernice. Donzaleigh Abernathy, Tony Bennett, Julian Bond and Ramsey Clark each portrayed themselves.

== Reception ==
Though heavily promoted, the series met with controversy and was a huge ratings disappointment. The first installment was the lowest rated of all 64 prime time programs for the week of its debut.

== Cast ==
- Paul Winfield as Martin Luther King Jr.
- Cicely Tyson as Coretta Scott King
- Tony Bennett as himself
- Roscoe Lee Browne as Phillip Harrison
- Lonny Chapman as Chief Frank Holloman
- Ossie Davis as Martin Luther King Sr.
- Cliff DeYoung as Robert F. Kennedy
- Al Freeman Jr. as Damon Lockwood
- Clu Gulager as William C. Sullivan
- Steven Hill as Stanley Levison
- William Jordan as John F. Kennedy
- Warren J. Kemmerling as Lyndon B. Johnson
- Lincoln Kilpatrick as Jerry Waring
- Kenneth McMillan as Theophilus E. "Bull" Connor
- Howard E. Rollins Jr. as Andrew Young
- David Spielberg as David Beamer
- Dolph Sweet as J. Edgar Hoover
- Dick Anthony Williams as Malcolm X
- Art Evans as A.D. King
- Frances Foster as Alberta Williams King
- Tony Holmes as Martin Luther King III
- Felecia Hunter as Yolanda King
- Roger Robinson as Fred Shuttlesworth
- Ernie Lee Banks as Ralph Abernathy
- Donzaleigh Abernathy as herself
- Alveda King as Babysitter
- Julian Bond as himself
- Ramsey Clark as himself
- Christine King Farris as Ferris Church Soloist
- Maynard Jackson as Wallace Whitmore
- Bernice King as Student
- Dexter Scott King as Student #2
- Martin Luther King III as Rev. Briggs
- Yolanda King as Rosa Parks

Annazette Chase was considered to portray Coretta Scott King.

== Home media ==
The miniseries was released on DVD on January 11, 2005.

== See also ==
- Civil rights movement in popular culture
- Notable film portrayals of Nobel laureates
