= Yolanda King =

American civil rights activist (1955–2007)

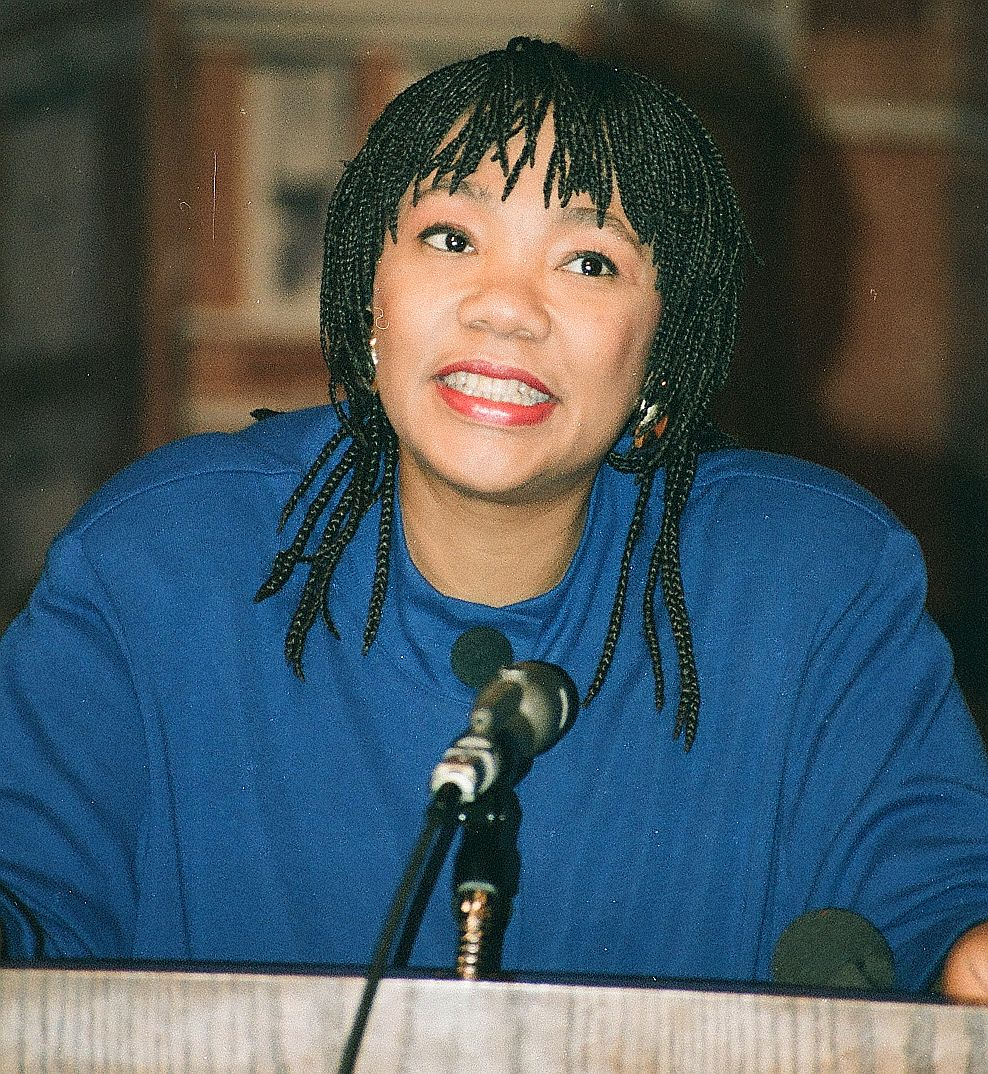
- King in 1995
- Born: Yolanda Denise King; November 17, 1955; Montgomery, Alabama, U.S.
- Died: May 15, 2007 (aged 51); Santa Monica, California, U.S.
- Other name: Yoki
- Education: Smith College (BA); New York University (MFA)
- Occupations: Actress, activist
- Years active: 1976–2007
- Known for: Daughter of Martin Luther King Jr.
- Parent(s): Martin Luther King Jr. Coretta Scott King
- Relatives: Martin Luther King III (brother); Dexter Scott King (brother); Bernice King (sister); Yolanda R. King (niece); Alveda King (paternal first cousin); Edythe Scott Bagley (maternal aunt); A. D. King (uncle)

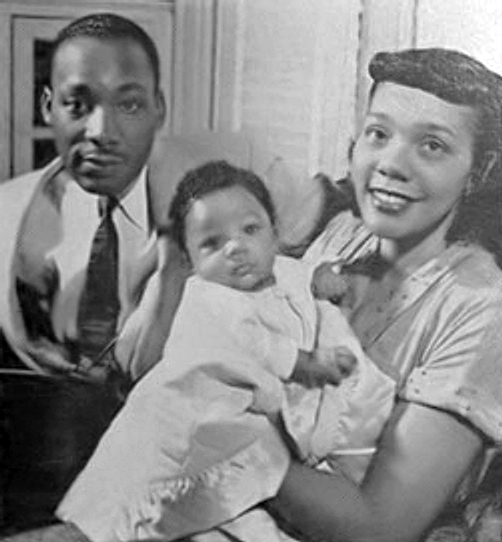
Yolanda King with her parents in 1956.

Yolanda Denise King (November 17, 1955 – May 15, 2007) was an American activist and campaigner for African-American rights and first-born child of civil rights leaders Martin Luther King Jr. and Coretta Scott King, who pursued artistic and entertainment endeavors and public speaking. Her childhood experience was greatly influenced by her father's highly public activism.

She was born two weeks before Rosa Parks refused to give up her seat on a public transit bus in Montgomery, Alabama. She occasionally experienced threats to her life, designed to intimidate her parents, and was bullied at school. When her father was assassinated on April 4, 1968, the 12-year-old King showed her composure during the public funeral and mourning events. King joined her mother and siblings in marches and was lauded by such figures as Harry Belafonte, who established a trust fund for her and her siblings. She became a secondary caregiver to her younger siblings.

In her teenage years, she became an effective leader of her high school class and was covered by the magazines Jet and Ebony. Her teenage years were filled with more tragedies, specifically the sudden death of her uncle Alfred Daniel Williams King and the murder of her grandmother, Alberta Williams King. While in high school, she gained lifelong friends. It was the first and only institution where King was not harassed or mistreated because of who her father was. However, she was still misjudged and mistrusted because of her skin color, based on perceptions founded solely upon her relationship with her father. Despite this, King managed to keep up her grades and became involved in high school politics, serving as class president for two years. King aroused controversy in high school for her role in a play. She was credited with having her father's sense of humor.

In the 1990s, she supported a retrial of James Earl Ray and publicly stated that she did not hate him. That decade saw King's acting career take off as she appeared in ten separate projects, including Ghosts of Mississippi (1996), Our Friend, Martin (1999) and Selma, Lord, Selma (1999). By the time she was an adult, she had grown to become a supporter of gay rights and an ally to the LGBT community, as was her mother. She was involved in a sibling feud that pitted her and her brother Dexter against their brother Martin Luther King III and sister Bernice King for the sale of the King Center in Atlanta, Georgia. King served as a spokesperson for her mother during the illness that would eventually lead to her death. King outlived her mother by only 16 months, succumbing to complications related to a chronic heart condition on May 15, 2007.

== Early life ==
=== Early childhood: 1955–1963 ===
Yolanda was born at St. Jude's Hospital in Montgomery, Alabama to Coretta Scott King and Martin Luther King Jr. She was only two weeks old when Rosa Parks refused to give up her seat on a bus. Even in her infancy, Yolanda was faced with the threats her father was given when they extended to his family. In 1956, a number of white supremacists bombed the King household. Yolanda and her mother were not harmed. She and her mother, at the time of the bomb's detonation, were in the rear section of their home. Despite this, the front porch was damaged and glass broke in the home. She kept her father busy when walking on their home's floors. While her mother liked her name, her father had reservations about naming her "Yolanda", due to the possibility that the name would be mispronounced. During the course of her lifetime, King's name was mispronounced to the point that it bothered her. King's father eventually was satisfied with the nickname "Yoki", and wished that if they had a second daughter, they would name her something simpler. The Kings would have another daughter, almost eight years later, named Bernice (born 1963). King recalled that her mother had been the main parent and dominant figure in their home, while her father was often away. Decision-making towards what school she would attend in first grade was done primarily by her mother, since her father expressed disinterest to her early in the decision-making.

Her mother referred to her as being a confidant during the time following her husband's assassination. She complimented her mother on her achievements and her mother spoke of her in a positive light, as well. When asked by a young boy what she remembered most about her father, she admitted that her father was not able to spend much time with her and the rest of her family. When he did, she would play and swim with him. King cried when she found out her father had been imprisoned. Her father admitted that he had never adjusted to bringing up children under "inexplicable conditions". When she was 6 years old, she was saddened by classmates' remarks that her father was a "jailbird". An important early memory was that she wanted to go to Funtown, a local amusement park, with the rest of her class, but was barred from doing so due to her race. She did not understand and asked her mother Coretta why she was not able to go. When she replied "Your father is going to jail so that you can go to Funtown." after numerous attempts to explain the issue to her, Yolanda finally understood. After having not seen her father for five weeks while he was in jail, she finally was able to meet with him alongside both of her brothers for less than half an hour. Her father also addressed the issue himself. He told her that there were many whites who were not racist and wanted her to go but there were many who were and did not want her to go. However, her father reassured her as she began to cry that she was "just as good" as anyone who went to Funtown, and that, one day in the "not too distant future", she was going to be able to go to "any town" along with "all of God's children".

=== Assassination of John F. Kennedy and Nobel Peace Prize: 1963–1964 ===
On November 22, 1963, when U.S. President John F. Kennedy was assassinated, she learned of his death at school. When she returned home, she rushed to confront her mother about his death and even ignored her grandfather, Martin Luther King, Sr., to tell her mother what she had heard and that they would not get their "freedom now." Her mother tried to debunk this, insisting that they would still get it. She predicted at that time that all of the "Negro leaders" would be killed and the non-leading African-Americans would agree to segregation. Her mother started to realize that Yolanda had become more aware of the possibility that her father could be killed as well. For Christmas 1963, King and her siblings accepted a sacrificial Christmas as appealed by their parents and only received a single gift. King and her brother Martin III bragged about their selflessness at school. In 1964, upon learning her father would receive the Nobel Peace Prize, she asked her mother what her father was going to do with the money he was receiving in addition to the award. After she suggested that he would most likely give it all away, King laughed with her mother.

=== Enrollment at Spring Street Elementary School and last years with father: 1965–1968 ===
King, and her brother "Marty", were enrolled in the fall semester of 1965 at Spring Street Elementary School, in Midtown Atlanta, Georgia. Soon thereafter, they would be joined by their younger brother Dexter. In 1966, Yolanda listened to a speech her father gave when he was addressing a rally. At the age of eight after writing her first play, she also enrolled in the only integrated drama school of that time. The head of the school was Walt Roberts, father of the actors Eric and Julia Roberts. She began speaking publicly at the age of ten and even filled in for her parents on occasion. Her memories of her father prompted her to state that he "believed we were all divine. I have chosen to continue to promote 'we're one, the oneness of us, and shine the spotlight,' as my father did." Coretta King wrote in her memoirs, My Life with Martin Luther King, Jr., that "Martin always said that Yoki came at a time in his life when he needed something to take his mind off the tremendous pressures that bore down upon him."

=== Father's death: 1968 ===
On the evening of April 4, 1968, when she was 12, Yolanda returned with her mother from Easter-dress shopping when Jesse Jackson called the family and reported that her father had been shot. Soon after, she heard of the event when a news bulletin popped up while she was washing dishes. While her siblings were trying to find out what it meant, Yolanda already knew. She ran out of the room, screamed "I don't want to hear it," and prayed that he would not die. She asked her mother at this time, if she should hate the man who killed her father. Her mother told her not to, since her father would not want that. King complimented her mother as a "brave and strong lady," leading to a hug between them. Four days later, she and her family accompanied their mother to Memphis City Hall on her own terms, as she and her brothers had wanted to come. King flew to Memphis, Tennessee with her brothers and mother and participated in leading a march in Memphis with sanitation workers and civil rights leaders.

King was visited by Mrs. Kennedy before her father's funeral. After the funeral, she was visited by classmates from Spring Street Middle School with flowers and cards. At that time, she was also called by Andrea Young, whose own father had insisted that she should. The two were the same age. Bill Cosby flew to Atlanta after the funeral and entertained King and her siblings. King and her siblings were assured an education thanks to the help of Harry Belafonte, who set up a trust fund for them years prior to their father's death.

In regards to the possibility that her father could have been saved, King said she doubted that her father could have lived much longer given all the stress he had during his tenure as a leader of the Civil Rights Movement. She did admit that, had he lived or he been listened to more, "we would be in a far better place." King openly stated years later that she did not hate James Earl Ray.

=== Teenage years and high school: 1968–1972 ===
In the fall of 1968, King attended Henry Grady High School in Midtown Atlanta, Georgia, where she was president of her sophomore and junior class and vice president of her senior class. She ranked in the top 10 percent of her class. She was active in student government and drama. She made lifelong friends while in the institution that would collectively be called the "Grady Girls". She was also on the student council. At that time, King still did not know what she wanted to do with her life, but acknowledged that many wanted her to be a preacher. Her inclinations were driven to be artistic, which did not suit the political aspects of her father's life. Of the King children, Yolanda was the only one to attend Grady High School, as her siblings would go to different high schools following her graduation.

During the family's interview with Mike Wallace in December 1968, Yolanda was introduced by her mother and revealed her role in keeping the family together. Being the oldest, she had to watch her three younger siblings; Martin Luther King III, Dexter King and Bernice King and referred to the three as independent when she watched them whenever their mother went out of town. Sometime after Martin Luther King's assassination, King told her mother "Mom, I'm not going to cry because my dad is not dead. He may be dead physically, and one day I am going to see him again".

On July 21, 1969, King's uncle and father's brother Alfred Daniel Williams King was found dead in the swimming pool of his home. His youngest two children, Esther and Vernon, were vacationing with King and her family in Jamaica when they heard of his death. On April 4, 1970, the second anniversary of her father's death, she and her sister Bernice attended their grandfather Martin Luther King, Sr.'s silent prayer for their father at his gravesite. The practice of going to her father's grave on the anniversary of either his birth or assassination became an annual ritual for the King family to mourn his death.

In her teenage years, King preferred to go by her nickname "Yoki." As she said during an interview, "I prefer Yoki. Maybe when I'm older I won't be able to stand Yoki, but Yolanda sounds so formal!" She felt teenagers were confused and were using drugs as a method to escape their problems.

At 15 she was subject to controversy when she appeared in the play The Owl and the Pussycat with a white male lead. Though her mother kept her naïve to the controversies so she could "fulfill [her] objective, which was to do the play", that did not stop her from learning of the negativity implemented from her role years later. Her grandfather Martin Luther King Sr. initially was not going to go to her performance due to opposition by locals, but changed his mind afterward. During a Sunday visit to Church, King was forced to stand before the congregation and explain her actions. In response to her role in the play and her own response to the role, a man wrote to Jet predicting that she would marry a white person before she was eighteen. Despite statements such as these, King did not become aware of the public discomfort with her role until years later, citing her mother's involvement in her knowledge of the criticism.

When King was 16, she received attention in Jet in 1972, where she talked about what her father's famous name was doing for her life. In the interview with the magazine, she related how people expected her to be "stuck up" and referred to it as one of the "handicaps" of being Martin Luther King's child. She recalled having met a friend that was scared of being acquainted with her, because of her father's identity and expressed her thoughts in the colleges she wished to attend. King would ultimately attend Smith College in Northampton, Massachusetts, after graduating from high school.

King called her father's name and having to live up to it a "challenge" and recalled a friend when she first met a friend of hers, who believed she could not say anything to King but after beginning to know her, realized that she was "no worse than my other friends" and she "could say anything" to her. King also voiced her dislike of the assumption that she would behave just like her mother and father, and the difficulty of being perceived as not being someone others could talk to. When asked what kind of world she would like to live in, King said she wished "people could love everybody". Despite this wish, she acknowledged that this was of no ease and expressed happiness that her father had changed many things, and even made some people gain self-esteem. Positive reception came to this interview, and Yolanda was even called the "leader of the 16-year-olds" for her "calmness, her concern," and "her vision".

== Early adulthood ==
=== College: 1972–1976 ===
After graduating from high school, she went to Smith College. She took classes taught by Manning Marable and Johnnella Butler, and became satisfied with her choice of a college. But after finishing her sophomore year and returning home so she could work over the summer, her grandmother Alberta Williams King was killed on June 30, 1974. With her death, the only remaining members of King's father's immediate family were her grandfather Martin Luther King, Sr. and aunt Christine King Ferris. She was also subject to some harassment by her classmates, describing it as the "era when students were making demands and many black students were closer to the teachings of Malcolm X, or what they thought were his teachings." The children referred to her father as an "Uncle Tom" and she was scared that he would go down in history as such. She reflected "I had never read his works. I was just someone who loved someone, and I knew he had done great things and now people didn't appreciate it." She proceeded to read his books, and started to believe that her father had been correct all along.

When asked about what pressures emerged from being a daughter of Martin Luther King Jr., King stated that "as soon as people heard me speak, they would compare me to my father ... My siblings had the same kind of pressure. There was such a need, like they were looking for a miracle." At the time of her turmoil in college, King recalled having not known Malcolm X and "didn't understand daddy, so here I was trying to defend something I thought I knew about but really didn't." On April 4, 1975, King joined her family in placing azaleas over her father's crypt, marking the seventh anniversary of his assassination.

=== Immediate life after Smith College: 1976–1978 ===
An alumna of Smith College after graduating in 1976, she was the subject of an essay among the "remarkable women" during a celebration during the college's one hundred and twenty-fifth year and she was a member of the board of directors of the Martin Luther King Jr. Center for Nonviolent Social Change, Inc. (the official national memorial to her father) and was founding Director of the King Center's Cultural Affairs Program. King became a human rights activist and actress. She stated in 2000 to USA Today, that her acting "allowed me to find an expression and outlet for the pain and anger I felt about losing my father,". Her mother's support helped in starting her acting career. Despite some early opposition to acting that she received during her controversial play in high school, King still tried to get roles and actively tried performing.

She served on the Partnership Council of Habitat for Humanity, was the first national Ambassador for the American Stroke Association's "Power to End Stroke" Campaign, a member of the Southern Christian Leadership Conference, a sponsor of the Women's International League for Peace and Freedom, Human Rights Campaign, and held a lifetime membership in the NAACP. King received a Bachelor of Arts degree from Smith College in Northampton, Massachusetts, a master's degree in theater from New York University, and an Honorary Doctorate of Humane Letters from Marywood University. In 1978, she starred as Rosa Parks in the TV miniseries King (based on her father's life and released on DVD in 2005).

=== Meeting Attallah Shabazz: 1979 ===
In 1979, Yolanda met Attallah Shabazz, the eldest daughter of Malcolm X, after arrangements had been made by Ebony Magazine to take a photograph of the two women together. Both were worried that they would not like each other due to their fathers' legacies. Instead, the two quickly found common ground in their activism and in their positive outlook towards the future of African-Americans. The two were young adults at the time and had a mutual friend who noticed they were both studying theater in New York and arranged for them to meet. A few months after King and Shabazz met, the pair decided to collaborate on a theatrical work, resulting in Stepping into Tomorrow. The play was directed towards teens and focused on the 10th year reunion of six high school friends. Stepping into Tomorrow led to the formation of Nucleus in the 1980s, a theater company which King and Shabazz founded. The theater company was based in New York City and Los Angeles and focused on addressing the issues that their fathers, Martin Luther King Jr. and Malcolm X, spoke of in their lifetimes. The pair performed in around 50 cities a year and did lectures together, typically in school settings.

== Adult life ==
=== King holiday, arrests, and return to Smith College: 1980–1989 ===
When presenting herself in 1980 to the GSA staff members, she stated: "Jim Crow [segregation] is dead, but his sophisticated cousin James Crow, Esq., is very much alive. We must cease our premature celebration [about civil rights already achieved] and get back to the struggle. We cannot be satisfied with a few black faces in high places when millions of our people have been locked out." She received a standing ovation afterwards, alongside a thunderous applause. In February 1982, King was a speaker during the centennial of Anne Spencer's birth. In 1984, she was arrested in the view of her mother for having protested in front of the South African Embassy, in support of anti-apartheid views. It was the first time she had ever been arrested. On January 7, 1986, Yolanda, her brother Martin Luther King III and her sister Bernice were arrested for "disorderly conduct" by officers responding to a call from a Winn Dixie market, which had had an ongoing protest against it since September of the previous year.

She showed dissatisfaction with her "generation" on January 20, 1985, and referred to them as being "laid-back and unconcerned", and "forgetting the sacrifices that allowed them to get away with being so laid-back". That same year, she presented the Martin Luther King Jr. Award for Public Service to Chicago Mayor Harold Washington during the fifth annual Ebony American Black Achievement Awards.

She celebrated her father's holiday on January 16, 1986, and attended a breakfast in Chicago with Mayor Harold Washington. She stated that her father had a "magnificent dream", but admitted that "it still is only a dream." King started Black History Month of 1986 by giving a speech in Santa Ana, which called for the study of African-American history to not be "relegated to the shortest and coldest month of the year." After having been a public speaker for over twenty years, Yolanda recalled her talents having "happened very naturally growing up in a house like mine". She also found "great irony" in President Ronald Reagan having signed a bill to make Martin Luther King Jr. Day a national holiday.

She kicked off Martin Luther King Jr. Day by starting a week-long celebration on January 12, 1987, and talked to students about opportunities that they had at that point which their parents and grandparents did not have. On April 8, 1988, King and Shabazz were honored by Los Angeles County supervisors for their "unifying" performance and message on stage at the Los Angeles Theater Center the previous night. Their play Stepping into Tomorrow was praised by supervisors as being "entertaining and enlightening." At the time of the honor, King said that their production company had been approached by organizations seeking to arrange special staging of the play for gang members before May 1, when the show's run would end. Supervisor Kenneth Hahn said to King that he "sensed I was in the presence of a great man when I met your father." She returned to Smith College on January 26, 1989. There, she gave a speech and made references to her past difficult experiences when first coming to the college. King made it clear that while she had not been "endeared" to the institution, she was still "grateful" for her experience. She called for Americans to memorialize those who gave their lives for "the struggle for peace and justice." At this point in her life, King also served as director of cultural affairs for the King Center for Nonviolent Social Change and was tasked with raising and directing funds for all artistic events.

She was the godmother of acclaimed actress RaéVen Larrymore Kelly. King and Kelly starred in three films together, HBO's "America's Dream" starring Danny Glover and Wesley Snipes, award-winning period film "Odessa," that deals with racial unrest in which King gives a stellar performance as a nanny who lost her son to racial violence, and in Rob Reiner's film "Ghosts of Mississippi" about the assassination of civil rights leader Medgar Evers starring Whoopi Goldberg and Alec Baldwin; King and Kelly played the adult and child versions of Reena Evers.

=== Arizona boycott and James Earl Ray retrial: 1990–1999 ===
On December 9, 1990, she canceled a planned appearance in a play in Tucson, Arizona and ignored a boycott going on at the time by civil rights groups and other activists for Arizona voters rejected the proposal of Martin Luther King Jr. Day being celebrated there. King and Shabazz had planned the play months before the voters of the state rejecting the holiday, and King prepared a statement which solidified her reasons for supporting the boycott. Despite this, Shabazz still appeared in the state and performed in the play. On January 17, 1991, Yolanda spoke before a crowd of students at Edmonds Community College, around 200 in number. She debunked complacency in having any role in progression of her father's dream. She joined her mother in placing a wreath around her father's crypt. King stressed in 1992 that love would help people make their mark on the world. That same year, she also spoke at Indiana University. In October, King gave support for a Cabrini-Green family that wants to escape the violence, and a fundraiser for their cause.

25 years after her father's assassination, she went to his gravesite. There, she joined hands with her siblings and mother along with other civil rights activists, singing We Shall Overcome. During July 1993, she agreed to speak at the Coral Springs City Centre for airfare and a fee in January 1994. She originally wanted $8,000, but negotiated down to $6,500. During her speech, she mentioned that the fact that the poverty line in America among children had nearly tripled and urged people to "reach out" and "do what you can". In October, she uttered her belief that her father's dream of integration was not fully understood.

On February 1, 1994, King attempted to speak before a diverse class of students at North Central College. She stated, "It is entirely appropriate that you would choose to focus on multiculturalism as the opening activity of Black History Month. The only reason why Black History Month was created and still exists is because America is still struggling and trying to come to grips, come to terms with the diversity of its people." In July 1994, after seeing some photographs of her father prior to his death, Yolanda lamented that "this [had] brought back a lot of memories. It's often hard for young people to understand the fear and terror so many people felt and how bold they were to get involved in the marches. But walking through the first part of the exhibit I felt that terror." She honored her father in 1995 by performing in the Chicago Sinfonietta in the play "A Lincoln Portrait", in which she was the narrator. The "commitment" to diverse members in the audience and the play itself, was what represented the opportunities for which King fought.

In the fall of 1995, at age 39, she joined Ilyasah Shabazz and Reena Evers in saluting their mothers as they chaired an attempt at registering one million African-American women to vote in the presidential election of 1996. King joined the rest of her family in February 1997, in advocating a retrial for James Earl Ray, the man convicted of her father's murder, having realized that "without our direct involvement, the truth will never come out." In an interview with People magazine in 1999, she recalled when she first learned of her father's death and stated in her words that "to this day, my heart skips a beat every time I hear one of those special bulletins." King appeared in the film Selma, Lord, Selma, based on the 1965 Selma to Montgomery marches as Miss Bright. Prior to the film's release, King expressed belief in children of the time knowing that "Martin Luther King Jr. was killed, but when it is time to talk about the facts and the history, there is not a lot of knowledge. They look at me when I'm talking as if this is science fiction."

== Final years: 2000–2007 ==
King attended and spoke at the Human Rights Campaign Detroit Gala Dinner of 2000. In a twenty-four-minute-long speech, she brought up the presidential election of that year, and also quoted the words of Bobby Kennedy by recalling his line which he took from George Bernard Shaw, that "some men see things as they are and say why? I dream things that never were and say why not?". During a presentation in May 2000, King was asked if the human race would ever become "color blind". In response, she pushed for "the goal" to be "color acceptance." Following the September 11 attacks, King spoke in North Chicago in 2002 and related that her father's wisdom during the crisis would have been of great aid to her. She mentioned the possibility that the event could have been a calling for Americans to put their loyalty towards "their race, tribe and nation", as her father once said. She, her brother Martin Luther King III and Al Sharpton sang We Shall Overcome in front of "The Sphere", which stood atop the World Trade Center prior to the September 11 attacks.

In honor of her father, King promoted a show in Los Angeles entitled "Achieving the Dream" in 2001. During the play, she changed costume numerous times and adjusted her voice and body language when changing roles. King and Elodia Tate co-edited the book Open My Eyes, Open My Soul: Celebrating Our Common Humanity, published by McGraw-Hill in 2003. In January 2004, King referred to her father as a king, but not as one who "sat on a throne, but one who sat in a dark Birmingham jail." While in Dallas in March 2004, King related; "It's only in the past half-dozen years or so that I have felt comfortable in my own skin. I don't have to try and prove anything to anyone anymore." "I struggled with a lot of the legacy for a long time, probably actually into my 30s before I really made peace with it," Yolanda stated in 2005 on "Western Skies", a public radio show based in Colorado. During the fall of 2004 she played Mama in "A Raisin in the Sun" at the Schwartz Center for the Performing Arts at Cornell University.

=== Mother's death, sibling dispute and final months: 2006–2007 ===
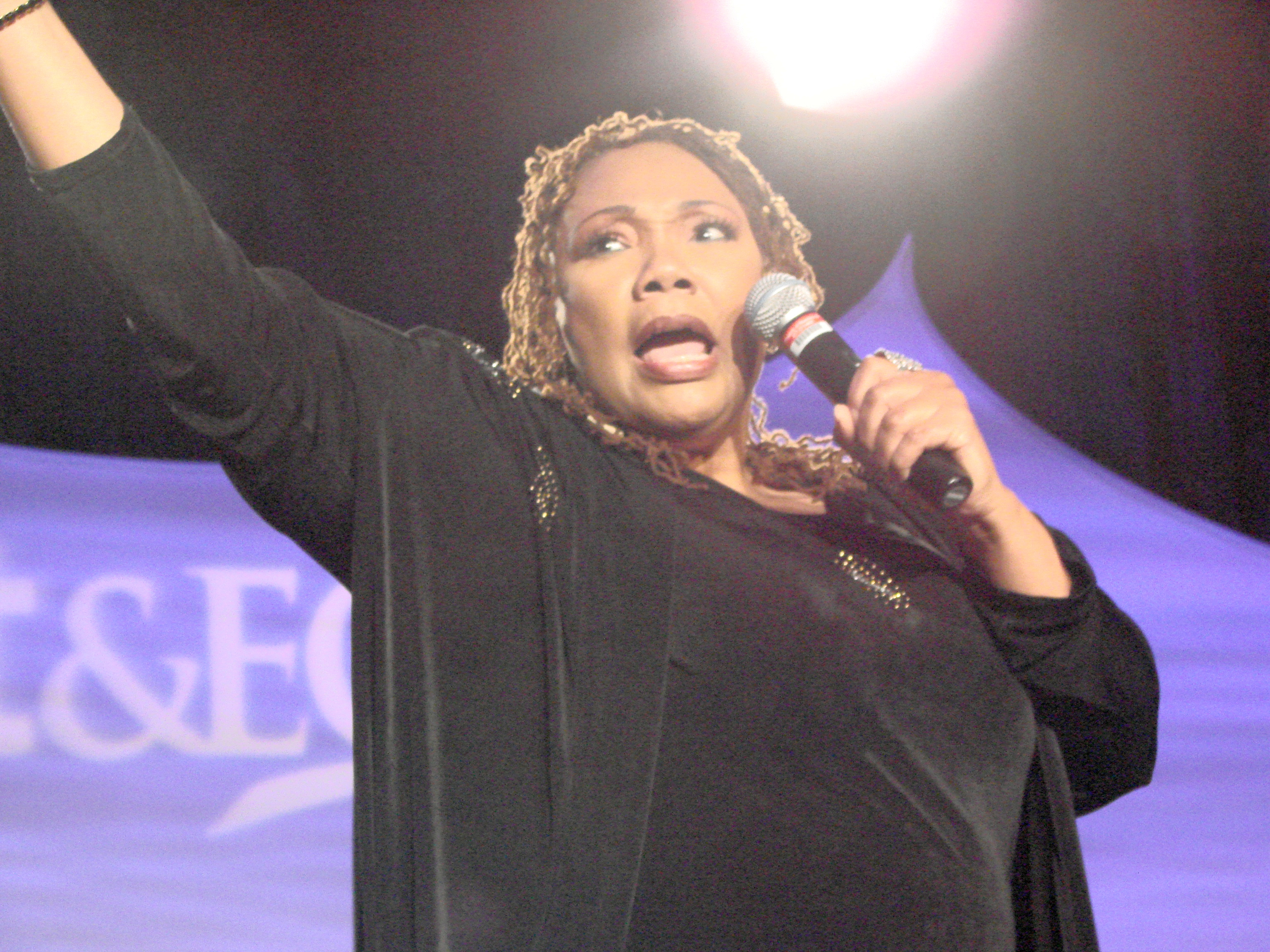
King at the Out & Equal Workplace Summit, 2006

Coretta Scott King began to decline in health after suffering a stroke in August 2005. She also was diagnosed with ovarian cancer. The four children of the civil rights activist noticed "something was happening". King was having a conversation with her mother in her home when she stopped talking. Coretta had a blood clot move from her heart and lodge in an artery in her brain. She was hospitalized on August 16, 2005, and was set to come home as well. Alongside the physician that took care of her mother, Dr. Maggie Mermin and her sister, Yolanda told the press that her mother was making progress on a daily basis and was expected to make a full recovery. She became a spokesperson for the American Heart Association after her mother's stroke, promoting a campaign to raise awareness about strokes.

That year, she and her brother Dexter came to oppose their other brother and sister, Martin Luther King III and Bernice King, on the matter of selling the King Center. King and Dexter were in favor of sale, but their other siblings were not. After Coretta died on January 30, 2006, Yolanda, like her siblings, attended her funeral. When asked about how she was faring following her mother's death, Yolanda responded: "I connected with her spirit so strongly. I am in direct contact with her spirit, and that has given me so much peace and so much strength." She found her mother's personal papers in her home.

She preached in January 2007 to an audience in Ebenezer Baptist Church urging them to be an oasis for peace and love, as well as to use her father's holiday as starting ground for their own interpretations of prejudice. She spoke on Martin Luther King Jr. Day 2007 to attendees at the Ebenezer Baptist Church and stated: "We must keep reaching across the table and, in the tradition of Martin Luther King Jr. and Coretta Scott King, feed each other,". After her hour-long presentation, she joined her sister and her aunt, Christine King Farris, in signing books. On May 12, 2007, just three days before her death, she spoke at St. Mary Medical Center in Langhorne, Pennsylvania, on behalf of the American Stroke Association.

== Death ==
On May 15, 2007, King told her brother Dexter that she was tired, though he thought nothing of it because of her "hectic" schedule. Around an hour later, King collapsed in the Santa Monica, California home of Philip Madison Jones, her brother Dexter King's best friend, and could not be revived. She was 51 years old; her death came a year after her mother died. Her family has speculated that her death was caused by a heart condition. In the early hours of May 19, 2007, King's body was brought to Atlanta, Georgia by private plane belonging to Bishop Eddie Long. A public memorial for Yolanda King was held on May 24, 2007, at Ebenezer Baptist Church Horizon Sanctuary in Atlanta, Georgia. Many in attendance did not know her, but came out of respect for the King family's history of peace protests and social justice. King was cremated, in accordance with her wishes. Her three siblings lit a candle in her memory.

Bernice King said it was "very difficult standing here blessed as her one and only sister. Yolanda, from your one and only, I thank you for being a sister and for being a friend." Martin Luther King III uttered that "Yolanda is still in business. She just moved upstairs." Maya Angelou wrote a tribute to her, which was read during the memorial service. She wrote "Yolanda proved daily that it was possible to smile while wreathed in sadness. In fact, she proved that the smile was more powerful and sweeter because it had to press itself through mournfulness to be seen, force itself through cruelty to show that the light of survival shines for us all." Many former classmates of both Grady High School and Smith College attended to remember her. Raphael Warnock stated; "She dealt with the difficulty of personal pain and public responsibility and yet ... she emerged from it all victorious. Thank you for her voice."

== Ideas, influence, and political stances ==
To the time of her death, King continued to deny that her father's dreams and ideals would be fulfilled during her lifetime. In 1993, she debunked the thought that her father's "dream" had been anything but a dream, and was quoted as saying "It's easier to build monuments than to make a better world. It seems we've stood still and in many ways gone backward since Martin Luther King Jr. was alive.", during a celebration that marked what would have been her father's 64th birthday.

Despite this, she was quoted in January 2003 of saying that she was "a 100 percent, dyed-in-the-wool, card-carrying believer in 'The Dream'. It's a dream about freedom—freedom from oppression, from exploitation, from poverty ... the dream of a nation and a world where each and every child will have the opportunity to simply be the very best that they can be." The statement was made while she was in the presence of 800 people who gathered to honor her father at the Everett Theatre. She made it clear that month that she was not trying to fill her father's footsteps, noting jokingly that "They're too big" and that she would "fall and break [her] neck". She also advocated for her father's holiday to be used as a day for helping others, and also expressed dissatisfaction on the basis of people relaxing on his day. On January 15, 1997, she spoke at Florida Memorial College and expressed what she believed her father would feel if "he knew that people were taking a day off in his memory to do nothing". She disliked cliches used to define her father and expressed this to Attallah Shabazz, and recalled having seen a play where her father was a "wimp" and carried The Bible with him everywhere.

King was an ardent activist for gay rights, as was her mother; Coretta Scott protested many times over gay rights. She was among 187 people arrested during a demonstration by lesbian and gay rights activists. She stated at the Chicago's Out and Equal Workplace Summit in 2006 "If you are gay, lesbian, bisexual or transgender, you do not have the same rights as other Americans, you cannot marry, ... you still face discrimination in the workplace, and in our armed forces. For a nation that prides itself on liberty, justice and equality for all, this is totally unacceptable." Like her parents and siblings, King did not publicly affiliate with a political party. Despite this, she did voice opposition to President Ronald Reagan's reluctance to sign the law establishing Martin Luther King Jr. Day, her father's national holiday.

== Legacy ==
Dexter King said of his sister, "She gave me permission. She allowed me to give myself permission to be me." Jesse Jackson stated that King "lived with a lot of the trauma of our struggle. The movement was in her DNA." Joseph Lowery stated; "She was a princess and she walked and carried herself like a princess. She was a reserved and quiet person who loved acting." January 2008's issue of Ebony, her relationship with Rev. Suzan Johnson Cook was highlighted in an article written by the minister, as she dubbed her deceased longtime friend a "queen whose name was King". On May 25, 2008, her brother Martin Luther III and his wife, Arndrea, became the parents of a baby girl and named her Yolanda Renee King, after King herself. During a 2009 reunion at her alma mater Smith College, a walk was done in her memory by fellow alumnae.

=== Portrayals in film ===
Yolanda has mostly been portrayed in films that revolve around her parents.

- Felecia Hunter, in the 1978 television miniseries King.
- Melina Nzeza as a child and Ronda Louis-Jeune as an adult, in the 2013 television movie Betty and Coretta.

== Filmography ==
- King (1978, television mini-series) as Rosa Parks
- Hopscotch (1980) as Coffee Shop Manager
- Death of a Prophet (1981, television film) as Betty Shabazz
- No Big Deal (1983, television movie) as Miss Karnisian's Class
- Talkin' Dirty After Dark (1991) as Woman #2
- America's Dream (1996, television series) starred with her goddaughter RaéVen Larrymore Kelly
- Fluke (1996, television film) as Mrs. Crawford (segment "The Boy Who Painted Christ Black")
- Ghosts of Mississippi (1996) as Reena Evers (with her goddaughter RaéVen Larrymore Kelly)
- Drive by: A Love Story (1997, Short) as Dee
- Our Friend, Martin (1999, Video) as Christine King (voice)
- Selma, Lord, Selma (1999, television series) as Miss Bright
- Funny Valentines (1999) as Usher Lady #2
- The Secret Path (1999, television movie) as Ms. Evelyn
- Odessa (2000, short) as Odessa
- JAG (2000, television series) as Federal Judge Esther Green in episode "Overdue and Presumed Lost"
- Any Day Now (2001, television series) as Marilyn Scott
- Liberty's Kids (2002, television series) as Elizabeth Freeman (voice)
- The Still Life (2006) as Herself / Art Buyer
- Jim Henson's Construction Site Movie (2007, film) as Charlene (voice, final film role)
