= Dexter King =

Civil rights activist and son of Martin Luther King Jr

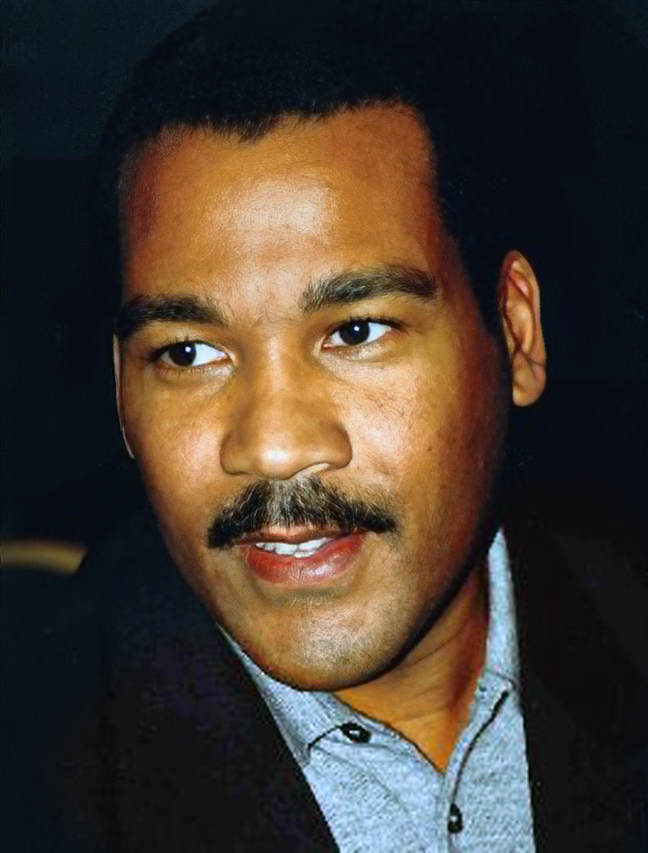
- King in 1999
- Born: Dexter Scott King; January 30, 1961; Atlanta, Georgia, U.S.
- Died: January 22, 2024 (aged 62); Malibu, California, U.S.
- Education: Morehouse College
- Occupations: Civil rights activist; advocate
- Known for: Son of Martin Luther King Jr. Chairman, The Martin Luther King Jr. Center for Nonviolent Social Change
- Spouse: Leah Weber (m. 2013)
- Parent(s): Martin Luther King Jr. Coretta Scott King
- Relatives: Alberta Williams King (grandmother); Martin Luther King Sr. (grandfather); Yolanda Denise King (sister); Bernice King (sister); Martin Luther King III (brother); Yolanda Renee King (niece); Alveda King (cousin); Edythe Scott Bagley (aunt); Christine King Farris (aunt)

Dexter Scott King (January 30, 1961 – January 22, 2024) was an American civil rights activist, animal rights activist, and an author. The second son of civil rights leaders Martin Luther King Jr. and Coretta Scott King, he was also the brother of Martin Luther King III, Bernice King, and Yolanda King; and also the grandson of Alberta Williams King and Martin Luther King Sr. He is the author of Growing Up King: An Intimate Memoir.

== Early life ==
Dexter Scott King was born on January 30, 1961, at Children's Healthcare of Atlanta – Hughes Spalding Children's Hospital in Atlanta, Georgia, to Martin Luther King Jr. and Coretta Scott King. and named after the Dexter Avenue Baptist Church in Montgomery, Alabama, where his father was pastor before moving to the Ebenezer Baptist Church in Atlanta. His oldest sister Yolanda watched after him.

King was seven years old when his father was assassinated in 1968. He was watching television with his older brother, Martin III, when they saw a news flash about the shooting. King and his siblings were assured an education thanks to the help of Harry Belafonte, who set up a trust fund for them years prior to their father's assassination. King attended the Democratic National Convention in 1972, which led him to gain an interest in politics.

King attended his father's alma mater of Morehouse College, where he studied business administration from 1979 to 1984. He left Morehouse before completing his degree.

== Work ==
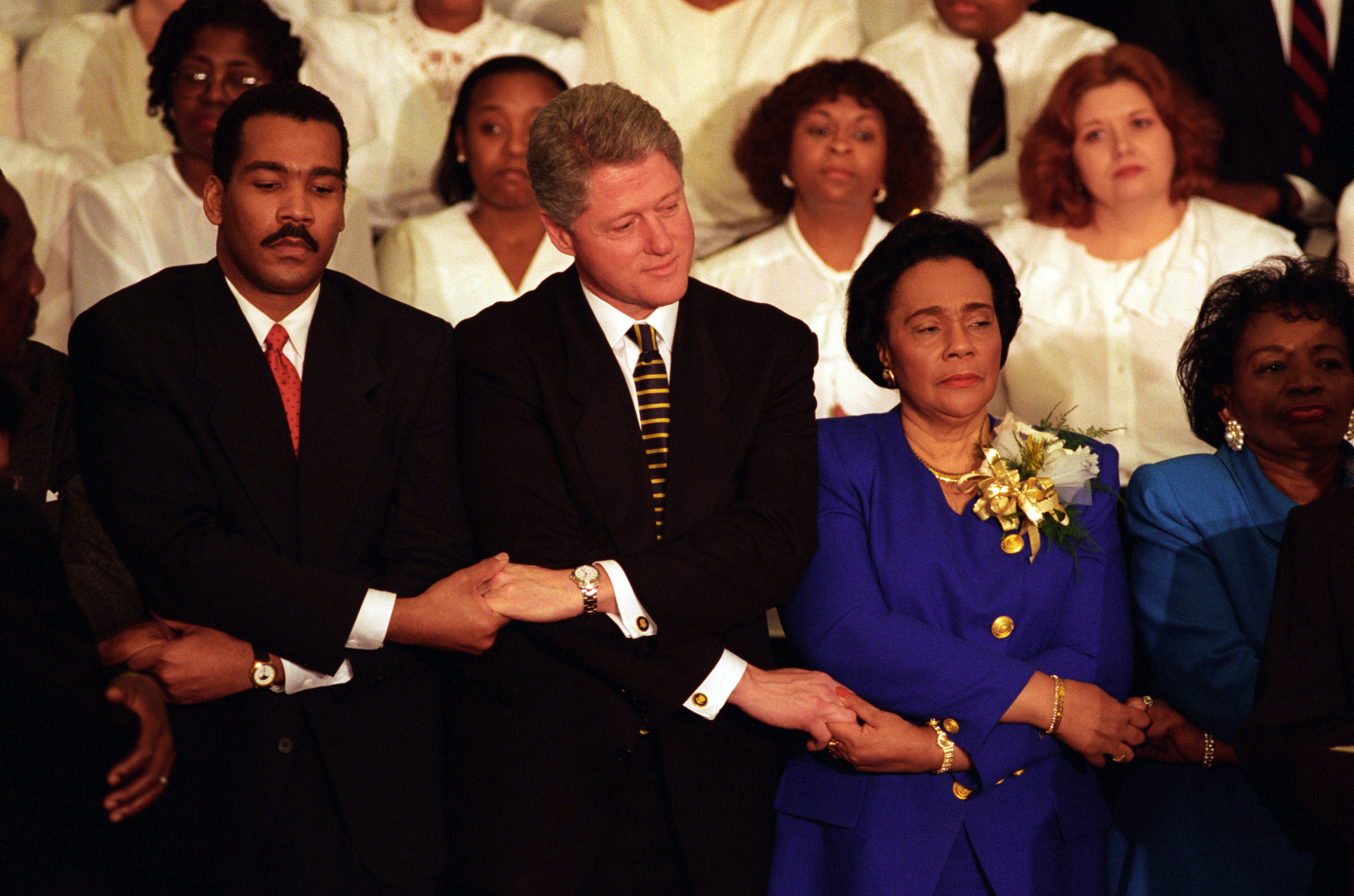
President Bill Clinton joins hands with Dexter King and Coretta Scott King during a Martin Luther King, Jr. Commemorative Service at Ebenezer Baptist Church in Atlanta, Georgia, 1996.

King split his time between Atlanta, Georgia, where he served as chairman of the King Center for Nonviolent Social Change, and Malibu, California.

In May 1989, King's mother named the twenty-eight-year-old as her successor as president of the King Center. Before his mother's choice, King openly expressed interest in changing the King Center into "a West Point of nonviolent training". Dexter Scott King served as president of the King Center for Nonviolent Social Change, but resigned only four months after taking the office after a dispute with his mother. He resumed the position in 1994, but the King Center's influence was sharply reduced by then. As President, he cut the number of staff from 70 to 14 and shut down a child care center among a shift from conventional activities to prioritizing preserving his father's legacy. Reflecting, King admitted that the time was not right since he was "probably moving faster than the board was ready to".

Dexter was a dedicated vegan and animal rights activist, having been introduced to vegetarianism in the late 1980s by Dick Gregory.

On August 24, 2013, aged 52, King attended the 50th anniversary of the March on Washington, the event at which his father delivered his "I Have a Dream" speech.

=== Film ===
Dexter Scott King voiced his father's 34-year-old self in the 1999 educational film, Our Friend, Martin. The film was nominated for an Emmy Award for Outstanding Animated Program.

Dexter Scott King also portrayed Martin Luther King Jr. in the 2002 American television movie The Rosa Parks Story.

== Loyd Jowers trial ==
In 1997, 29 years after Martin Luther King Jr.'s death, Dexter met with James Earl Ray, the man imprisoned for his father's 1968 murder. When confronting him, King asked Ray, "I just want to ask you, for the record, um, did you kill my father?" Ray replied, "No-no I didn't." King then told Ray that he along with the rest of the King family believed him. King and Ray had then discussed the latter's health and the actions of J. Edgar Hoover. King also told him that his family believed in his testament of innocence and were seeking to help him. The two spoke privately after 25 minutes with reporters, and King asserted to reporters that he did not know who killed his father and that this uncertainty was the cause of their request for a new trial. As he asserted that he did not believe Ray had any role in his father's death, he brought up evidence taken from the scene such as the murder weapon and concluded that Ray would not have disposed of it near the scene of the crime, calling his belief as having been in his "gut".

At a 1999 press conference, Dexter was subsequently asked by a reporter, "there are many people out there who feel that as long as these conspirators remain nameless and faceless there is no true closure, and no justice". He replied:

No, he [Loyd Jowers] named the shooter. The shooter was the Memphis Police Department Officer, Lt. Earl Clark who he named as the killer. Once again, beyond that you had credible witnesses that named members of a Special Forces team who didn't have to act because the contract killer succeeded, with plausible denial, a Mafia contracted killer.

His belief towards a conspiracy extended to President Lyndon B. Johnson. He believed that with the evidence he was shown, there would be difficulty "for something of that magnitude to occur on his watch and he not be privy to it". King pursued Andrew Young to get him involved, and Young changed his position on the assassination of his father after being visited by Dexter in the spring of 1997. His position had always been "that it didn't matter who killed Dr. King but what killed him".

== Filmography and literary works ==
=== Actor ===
- 1-800-Missing, Lost Sister episode (2004)
- The Rosa Parks Story (2002)
- Our Friend, Martin (1999)
- King (1978)
- King Holiday music video by The King Dream Chorus (1986)
- Emma Mae (1976)

=== Producer ===
- King Holiday by King Dream Chorus & Holiday Crew (1986)
- Living the Dream: A Tribute to Dr. Martin Luther King Jr. (1988)

=== Author ===
- King, Dexter Scott; Wiley, Ralph (January 7, 2003). Growing Up King: An Intimate Memoir. Grand Central Publishing. ISBN 9780759527331.

== Personal life ==
In July 2013, Dexter married Leah Weber in a private ceremony in California.

=== Family ===
External image
- Coretta Scott King and her son Dexter, listening to Martin Luther King, Jr., speak to a crowd at Dexter Avenue Baptist Church in Montgomery, Alabama.

King's mother, Coretta Scott King, died on January 30, 2006, at age 78 on his 45th birthday.

Dexter's elder sister, Yolanda, collapsed at the home of his best friend, Philip Madison Jones, on May 15, 2007. King called his aunt Christine King Farris and reported that he had tried to save her, but was not successful and was transporting her to the hospital. She could not be revived and died at age 51. Her family believes she had a heart condition. Dexter spoke to her just an hour before her death, and did not think much of it when she told him she was tired due to her "hectic" schedule. With regard to his sister's death and the role she had played in his life, King stated

She gave me permission. She allowed me to give myself permission to be me.

Dexter charged The Atlanta Journal-Constitution with "viciously attacking" his family after the newspaper printed a claim by a German television program that his sister Bernice wanted $4,000 or $5,000 for a ten-minute interview, which King denied.

=== Lawsuits ===
On July 11, 2008, Dexter King was sued by his sister Bernice King and brother Martin Luther King III; in addition, he was sued by Bernice King on behalf of the estate of Coretta Scott King. The lawsuit alleged that Dexter improperly took funds from their parents' estate. Dexter filed countersuits against his siblings over their use of the King Center and over the ownership of their mother's personal papers, which he wanted to share with a biographer for a deal with Penguin Books.

These lawsuits were filed in Fulton County, Georgia Superior Court and were settled out of court in October 2009. In 2010, the three supported that year's census, seemingly indicating they had reaffirmed their relationships since the dispute. In 2016, the siblings' remaining legal dispute, over the ownership of King's 1964 Nobel Peace Prize medal, was settled out of court. Former U.S. president Jimmy Carter served as one of the mediators.

== Death ==
Dexter King died of prostate cancer at his home in Malibu, California, on January 22, 2024, aged 62.
