= Our Friend, Martin =

- VHS cover
- Directed by: Rob Smiley; Vincenzo Trippetti
- Written by: Dawn Comer; Chris Simmons; Sib Ventress; Deborah Pratt
- Story by: Dawn Comer; Chris Simmons
- Produced by: Andy Boron; Andy Heyward; Phillip Jones; Robby London; Michael Maliani; Judith Reilly; Janice Sonski
- Starring: Ed Asner; Angela Bassett; Lucas Black; LeVar Burton; Danny Glover; Whoopi Goldberg; Samuel L. Jackson; James Earl Jones; Ashley Judd; Dexter King; Yolanda King; Robert Ri'chard; Susan Sarandon; John Travolta; Jaleel White; Oprah Winfrey
- Music by: Eric Allaman
- Production companies: DIC Entertainment; Intellectual Properties Worldwide
- Distributed by: 20th Century Fox Home Entertainment (under CBS/Fox Video)
- Release date: January 12, 1999
- Running time: 61 minutes
- Country: United States
- Language: English

Our Friend, Martin is a 1999 American direct-to-video animated educational fantasy film produced by DIC Entertainment and Intellectual Properties Worldwide and distributed by 20th Century Fox Home Entertainment under the CBS/Fox Video label, starring Robert Ri'chard, Lucas Black, Theodore Borders, Jessica Marie Garcia, Zachary Leigh, Susan Sarandon, and Whoopi Goldberg. The film follows two middle-schoolers who travel through time and meet Martin Luther King Jr. at several points in his life, but inadvertently create a temporal paradox when they try to bring him forward in time.

Our Friend, Martin was released on January 12, 1999, three days before King's 70th birthday. It was the final release under the CBS/Fox Video name before it was retired. It featured an all-star voice cast and was nominated for an Emmy Award in 1999 for "Outstanding Animated Program (For Programming More Than One Hour)".

== Plot ==
In 1999, black sixth-grader Miles Woodman attends Martin Luther King Jr. Middle School in Metro Atlanta with his white best friend Randy Smith, Latina classmate Maria Ramirez, and white bully Kyle Langon. Miles is inspired by Hank Aaron to be a baseball player, but his lax attitude results in him suffering academically; his teacher, Mrs. Joyce Clark, and principal, Mr. Harris, warn him that he may be forced to redo the sixth grade if his marks do not improve, with his history class project about the civil rights movement determining his educational future.

During a field trip to Martin Luther King Jr. National Historical Park, Miles and Randy tour King's childhood home, now the King Birth Home museum overseen by curator Mrs. Peck, who allows them to explore King's bedroom. As they interact with various objects, Miles and Randy are transported back in time to 1941, where they meet a 12-year-old King and his white friends, Sam and Skip Dale; however, their baseball game is interrupted by the Dale brothers' mother, who reprimands her sons for interacting with "coloreds". King explains that Mrs. Dale hates black people because she arbitrarily sees them as "different", but that responding with hatred in kind would only make matters worse. Miles and Randy are then transported to a passenger train in 1944, where King, now 15, is returning home from farming work in Simsbury, Connecticut while attending Morehouse College. When a conductor institutes racial barriers after the train crosses the Mason–Dixon line, King explains the racial segregation system, which Miles and Randy cannot fathom.

After having dinner with King's family, Miles and Randy look in King's room after he leaves to make the rounds with his father and are transported to Montgomery, Alabama in 1956, where the 27-year-old King is a minister at the First Baptist Church. During a Montgomery Improvement Association meeting about Rosa Parks and the Montgomery bus boycott, King is informed that his house has been bombed and returns home to find that his wife Coretta and newborn daughter Yolanda have escaped unharmed. Enraged, King's friend Turner rallies the black community to retaliate against the white community, but King stops him, reminding the crowd of Mahatma Gandhi's successful use of nonviolent resistance in the Quit India Movement, and Jesus's teachings about loving one's enemies. Miles and Randy are then transported to the Birmingham riot of 1963, where they witness the Birmingham Police Department and Birmingham Fire Department, under the orders of segregationist city official Bull Connor, indiscriminately attacking black protesters with fire hoses and police dogs, before being returned to 1999.

At school the next day, Miles and Randy lead an in-class discussion about the early civil rights movement and watch a videotape about the sit-in movement and the Birmingham riot, where Maria claims to have spotted Miles and Randy in archival footage. Suspicious and curious, Maria and Kyle follow Miles and Randy to the museum, where Mrs. Peck allows them inside but indirectly warns them of the butterfly effect. Miles, Randy, Maria, and Kyle are transported to the March on Washington in 1963, where they meet 34-year-old King as well as a young Mrs. Clark, and listen to King's "I Have a Dream" speech.

Returning to 1999, Miles, Randy, Maria, and Kyle learn that King was assassinated in 1968; to save him from this fate, they travel to 1941 convince King to come to the future, listing notable people of color that gained prominence after the 1960s to entice him to join them. However, only Miles and King return to 1999 together. As they travel through the neighborhood, they discover King's sudden absence created an alternate history that led to the civil rights movement's failure, with the Civil Rights Act of 1964 never being introduced and American society experiencing severe social and moral decline since then: Randy and Kyle, along with many white people Miles knew, are now aggressively racist; the middle school is segregated, almost entirely white, and named after Robert E. Lee; Mrs. Clark is not racist but is servile to the principal, Mr. Harris, who is now racist and domineering; Maria only knows Spanish and works as the school's janitor despite being a child; and Miles's family lives in poverty, having been denied upward mobility. Miles and King travel to the site of the museum, now burnt ruins in run-down Sweet Auburn, where King has a vision of his father telling him that "a man has no greater purpose than to serve his fellow man", and realizes his destiny is to return to his time and live his life as it played out, even if his activism ultimately leads to his death. After bidding Miles farewell, King reenters his house as it rebuilds itself, aging to 39 as he returns to his era, before stepping out onto the balcony of the Lorraine Motel, where he is assassinated.

With the original timeline restored, Miles reunites with Randy, Maria, and Kyle at the museum, where Mrs. Peck reveals she knew about their time travel adventures and even the alternate timeline, and explains that despite contemporary racial and social struggles, the world is still in a better place thanks to people like King compared to how it would have been without them, and that their progress lives on as long as people continue their efforts to change the future for the better. Miles receives an A-grade on his history project, allowing him to progress to seventh grade, and he and his friends vow to continue King's work.

== Voice cast ==
- Robert Ri'chard as Miles Woodman, an African-American baseball fan who is struggling academically.
- Lucas Black as Randy Smith, Miles's white Southern-accented best friend. In the alternate 1999, he is a racist bully who is friends with Kyle.
- Dexter King as Martin Luther King Jr. at age 34, when he delivered his "I Have a Dream" speech on August 28, 1963, which in the film is shown through archival audio.
  - LeVar Burton as Martin Luther King Jr. at age 27 in 1956, when he worked as a minister in Montgomery.
  - Jaleel White as Martin Luther King Jr. at age 15 in 1944, when he was on the train leaving Connecticut.
  - Theodore Borders as Martin Luther King Jr. at age 12 in 1941, when he first encountered Miles and Randy, and when he joins Miles to the alternate 1999 that was created by his absence from history.
- Jessica Marie Garcia as Maria Ramirez, Miles and Randy's Latina friend, and a gifted grade-skipper. In the alternate 1999, she is a janitor at Robert E. Lee Middle School who only understands Spanish.
- Zachary Leigh as Kyle Langon, a white student who bullies Miles and Randy, but later becomes their friend. In the alternate 1999, he is friends with Randy, and is racist toward Miles.
- Ed Asner as Mr. Harris, the principal of Martin Luther King Jr. Middle School. In the alternate 1999, he is still the principal of Robert E. Lee Middle School, but is racist and domineering.
- Angela Bassett as Mrs. Woodman, Miles's mother, a busy office worker. In the alternate 1999, she works as a maid and lives in poverty.
- Danny Glover as the Train Conductor of the segregated train that King took to return to Atlanta in 1944.
- Whoopi Goldberg as Mrs. Peck, the curator of the King Birth Home museum in Atlanta.
- Samuel L. Jackson as Turner, King's friend in 1956 who has more violent and vengeance-based ideals regarding black activism.
- James Earl Jones as Martin Luther King Sr., Martin Luther King Jr.'s father.
- Ashley Judd as Mrs. Dale, a white mother in 1941 who disapproves of her sons playing with black children.
- Richard Kind as Mr. Willis, a school bus driver who is nicknamed "Wild Man Willis" due to his tendency to drive recklessly. In the alternate 1999, he is a safer driver, but refuses to pick up black students.
- Yolanda King as Christine King, Martin Luther King Jr.'s sister.
- Susan Sarandon as Mrs. Joyce Clark, Miles' teacher. In the alternate 1999, she is a non-racist teacher at Robert E. Lee Middle School who is mistreated by Mr. Harris.
- John Travolta as Mr. Langon, Kyle's father.
- Adam Wylie as Sam Dale and Skip Dale, white brothers who play baseball with King in 1941 against their mother's wishes.
- Oprah Winfrey as Coretta Scott King, Martin Luther King Jr.'s wife.
- Frank Welker as Bull Connor/Chihuahua/German Shepherds. Bull Connor was Birmingham's Commissioner of Public Safety who violently suppressed civil rights demonstrations in the Birmingham riot of 1963; the Chihuahua is a dog that scares off Kyle while chasing Miles in the intro; and the German Shepherds are the police dogs at the Birmingham riot.
- Nicole Palacio as Parker Marie
- Jess Harnell as Reporter #1/Demonstrator #1
- Joe Lala as Reporter #2/Demonstrator #2
- John Wesley as Man/Demonstrator #3
- Elizabeth Primm as Old Woman/Demonstrator #4
- Jodi Carlisle as Additional voices

== Soundtrack ==
Motown Records released a soundtrack album, including the talents of Diana King, Sheryl Crow, The Jackson 5, Salt-N-Pepa, Montell Jordan, 702 and Stevie Wonder. The soundtrack also features covers of "Ain't No Mountain High Enough" (which combined the Marvin Gaye/Tammi Terrell and Diana Ross versions) and Exposé's song "As Long as I Can Dream" (which was also included on the soundtrack to the theatrical film Stuart Little released later that same year) by Debelah Morgan.

No.	Title	Writer(s)	Length
1.	"Imagine" (Salt-N-Pepa featuring Sheryl Crow)	Cheryl James; Joseph Powell
2.	"Feelin' It" (Antuan & Ray Ray featuring P-Nutt and Shortee Red)	Antonio Zagaceta; Charles Wiggins
3.	"Ain't No Mountain High Enough" (Debelah Morgan)	Nickolas Ashford; Valerie Simpson
4.	"Finding My Way" (702)	Nicole Johnson; Malik Pendleton
5.	"When They Were Kings" (Brian McKnight and Diana King)	Andy Marvel; Arnie Roman; Amy Powers
6.	"I'll Be There" (The Jackson 5)	The Corporation
7.	"What's Going On" (Marvin Gaye)	Marvin Gay Jr.; Al Cleveland; Renaldo Benson
8.	"4 You" (Montell Jordan featuring Schappell Crawford and Fulfillment Choir)	Andrew Reid; Barry Burrell
9.	"Peace in the World" (Shanice)	Shanice Wilson; Narada Michael Walden; Sally Jo Dakota; Jarvis L. Baker
10.	"Reach Out and Touch (Somebody's Hand)" (Diana Ross)	Ashford; Simpson
11.	"Happy Birthday" (Stevie Wonder)	Stevland Morris
12.	"As Long as I Can Dream" (Debelah Morgan)	Diane Warren; Roy Orbison

== Production ==
In 1997, DIC Entertainment was attached to produce their first direct-to-video animated special about the life of civil rights activist Martin Luther King Jr. DIC partnered with 20th Century Fox Home Entertainment and hoped that it would become a perennial viewing for Martin Luther King Jr. Day. The film was released on January 12, 1999.

=== Casting ===
Whoopi Goldberg, Danny Glover, James Earl Jones, Angela Bassett, Samuel L. Jackson, Oprah Winfrey, Jaleel White and LeVar Burton were featured as the voice talents in the film while King himself was voiced by his son Dexter King.

== See also ==
- Civil rights movement in popular culture
