= James Albert King =

American sharecropper, grandfather of Martin Luther King Jr.

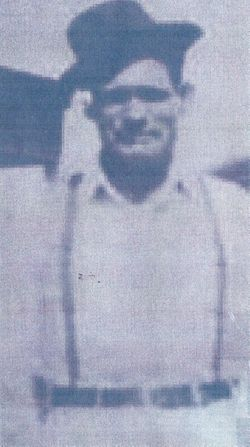
- Born: December 1864
- Died: 17 November 1933 (aged 68); Fulton County, Georgia
- Children: 7, including Martin Luther King Sr.
- Father: Nathan King
- Relatives: Martin Luther King Jr. (grandson); Christine King Farris (granddaughter); A. D. King (grandson)

James Albert King (December 1864 – November 17, 1933) was the father of Martin Luther King Sr. and paternal grandfather of civil rights leader Martin Luther King Jr., A. D. King, and Christine King Farris.

== Early life ==
James Albert King was born in 1864 to an Irish American father Nathan King, and Malinde, a freed African American slave. Nathan King has been variously recorded to have been born in Ohio, Pennsylvania, or Ireland. In 2010, DNA testing on James's great-grandson, Martin III by 23andMe confirmed that the King's family Y-chromosome lineage originated from Ireland. King married Delia Linsey (1875–1924) in 1895, and they both worked as sharecroppers, in Henry County and Clayton County in Georgia, and then Stockbridge, Georgia where they settled and where their son, Michael (later Martin Sr.) was born in 1899.

== Later life ==
King struggled with alcoholism, and disapproved of his son and wife attending church. When his son Martin became involved in an altercation with a white property owner the family went into hiding for a period. King died in 1933.
