= King Holiday =

1986 single by King Dream Chorus & Holiday Crew

Single by King Dream Chorus & Holiday Crew
- Released: January 13, 1986
- Genre: R&B, hip-hop
- Length: 4:35 (short version); 3:02 (dub version); 7:30 (long version)
- Label: Mercury/PolyGram
- Songwriters: Phillip Jones; Kurtis Blow; Grandmaster Melle Mel; Bill Adler
- Producers: Phillip Jones; Kurtis Blow [Michele Clark Jenkins and Dexter Scott King (exec. prod.)

King Holiday is a single released on January 13, 1986, by the King Dream Chorus & Holiday Crew. Composed by Phillip Jones, Kurtis Blow, Grandmaster Melle Mel and Bill Adler, it was released in honor of Martin Luther King Jr. Day, which was first celebrated as a national holiday in the United States on January 20, 1986. All proceeds from the single were donated to the King Center for Nonviolent Social Change. The single peaked at No.30 on the Billboard Hot Black Singles chart.

The project was spearheaded by Martin Luther King Jr.'s youngest son, Dexter Scott King, who is credited as the song's executive producer. All proceeds from the record actually went to the King Center.

"King Holiday" was produced by Phillip Jones and Kurtis Blow. The Music Video was produced by Michele Clark Jenkins. The song features: King Dream Chorus (vocalists)

- El DeBarge
- Whitney Houston
- Stacy Lattisaw
- Lisa Lisa with Full Force
- Teena Marie
- Menudo: 1986 members: Charlie Masso, Roy Rossello, Robi Rosa, Ray Acevedo, Ricky Martin
- Stephanie Mills
- New Edition
- James "J.T." Taylor

Holiday Crew (rappers)

- Kurtis Blow
- The Fat Boys
- Grandmaster Melle Mel
- Run–D.M.C.
- Whodini
