= Alveda King =

American civil rights activist, Christian minister (born 1951)

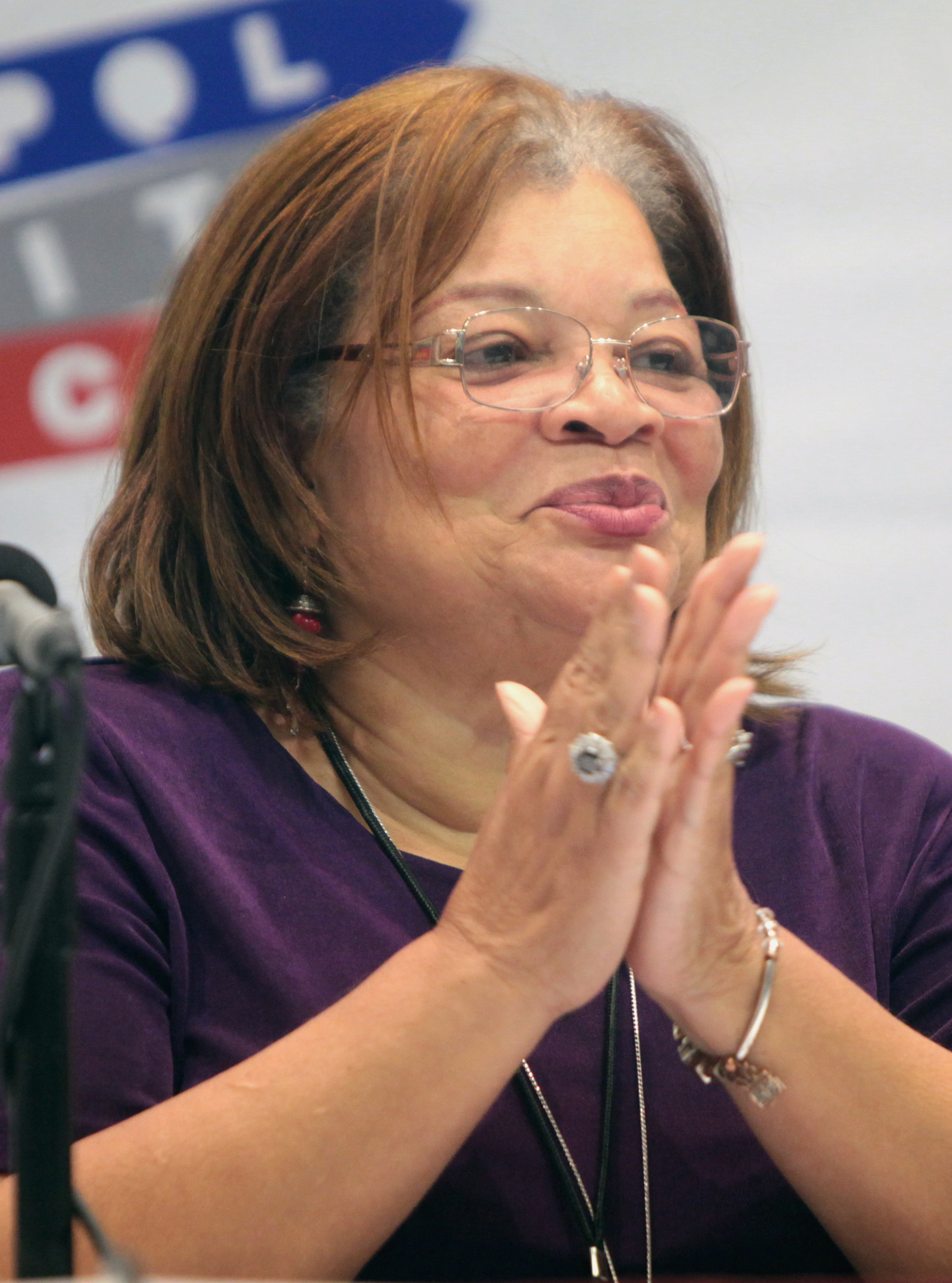

Member of the Georgia House of Representatives from the 28th district
- In office 1979–1983
- Preceded by: Virginia Shapard
- Succeeded by: Bob Holmes

Personal details
- Born: Alveda Celeste King; January 22, 1951 (age 75) Atlanta, Georgia, U.S.
- Party: Republican (1990s–present)
- Other political affiliations: Democratic (c. 1970s–1990s)
- Spouse(s): Eddie Clifford Beal (divorced); Jerry Ellis (divorced); Israel Tookes (divorced)
- Children: 6
- Parent(s): Alfred Daniel King; Naomi Ruth Barber
- Relatives: Alberta Williams King (paternal grandmother); Martin Luther King Sr. (paternal grandfather); Martin Luther King Jr. (paternal uncle); Christine King Farris (paternal aunt); Yolanda King (paternal first cousin); Dexter King (paternal first cousin); Bernice King (paternal first cousin); Martin Luther King III (paternal first cousin); Angela Stanton-King (goddaughter)
- Education: Central Michigan University (MA)

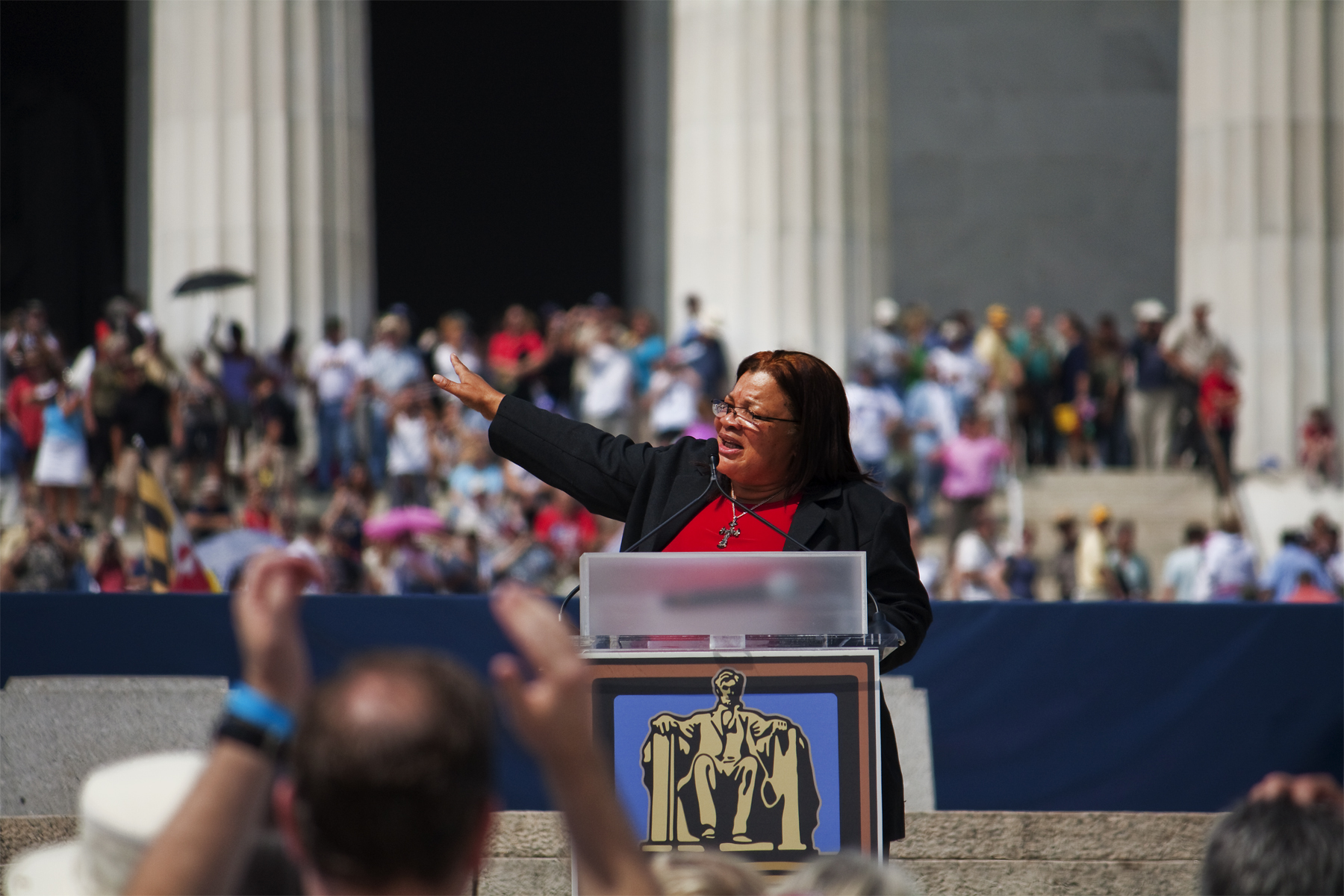
King at the 2010 Restoring Honor rally

Alveda Celeste King (born January 22, 1951) is an American activist, author, and former state representative for the 28th District in the Georgia House of Representatives.

She is a niece of civil rights leader Martin Luther King Jr. and daughter of civil rights activist Alfred Daniel King and his wife, Naomi Barber King. She is a Fox News Channel contributor. She once served as a senior fellow at the Alexis de Tocqueville Institution, a conservative Washington, D.C. think tank. She is a former member of the Georgia House of Representatives and the founder of Alveda King Ministries.

== Childhood and family ==
Alveda King was born Alveda Celeste King on January 22, 1951, in Atlanta, Georgia. She was the first of five children of Alfred Daniel King, the younger brother of Martin Luther King Jr., and his wife Naomi (Barber) King. King says her mother wanted to abort her so she could continue college, but her grandfather was able to persuade her to keep her child. When she was 12, her father became a leader of the Birmingham campaign while serving as pastor at the First Baptist Church of Ensley in Ensley near Birmingham, Alabama. Later that same year, King's house was bombed by opponents to the civil rights movement.

In 1969, her father, A. D. King, was found dead in the pool at his home. The cause of death was listed as an accidental drowning.

Martin Luther King Sr. wrote in his autobiography, "Alveda had been up the night before, she said, talking with her father and watching a television movie with him. He'd seemed unusually quiet ... and not very interested in the film. But he had wanted to stay up and Alveda left him sitting in an easy chair, staring at the TV, when she went off to bed. ... I had questions about A. D.'s death, and I still have them now. He was a good swimmer. Why did he drown? I don't know—I don't know that we will ever know what happened."

== Education ==
King studied journalism and sociology as an undergraduate and received a Master of Arts degree in business management from Central Michigan University. She received an honorary doctorate from Saint Anselm College.

== Public office ==
From 1979 to 1982, King represented the 28th District in the Georgia House of Representatives. The district included Fulton County, and King served as a Democrat.

In 1984 King ran for the seat of Georgia's 5th congressional district in the U.S. House of Representatives, challenging incumbent Representative Wyche Fowler. Hosea Williams was also a challenger in the primary.

Fowler defeated both King and Williams in the primary. It was the last time she ran for elected office. Since then, she has publicly stated "I've been a Democrat, and I've been a Republican. I've even considered being an independent. Today, I'm just a Christian."

King is a member of the Frederick Douglass Bicentennial Commission, having been nominated to the position by President Donald Trump in 2018.

In January 2026 King testified before the House Oversight Committee's "Task Force on the Declassification of Federal Secrets" on the declassification of government records related to the assassination of Martin Luther King Jr.

== Presidential endorsements ==
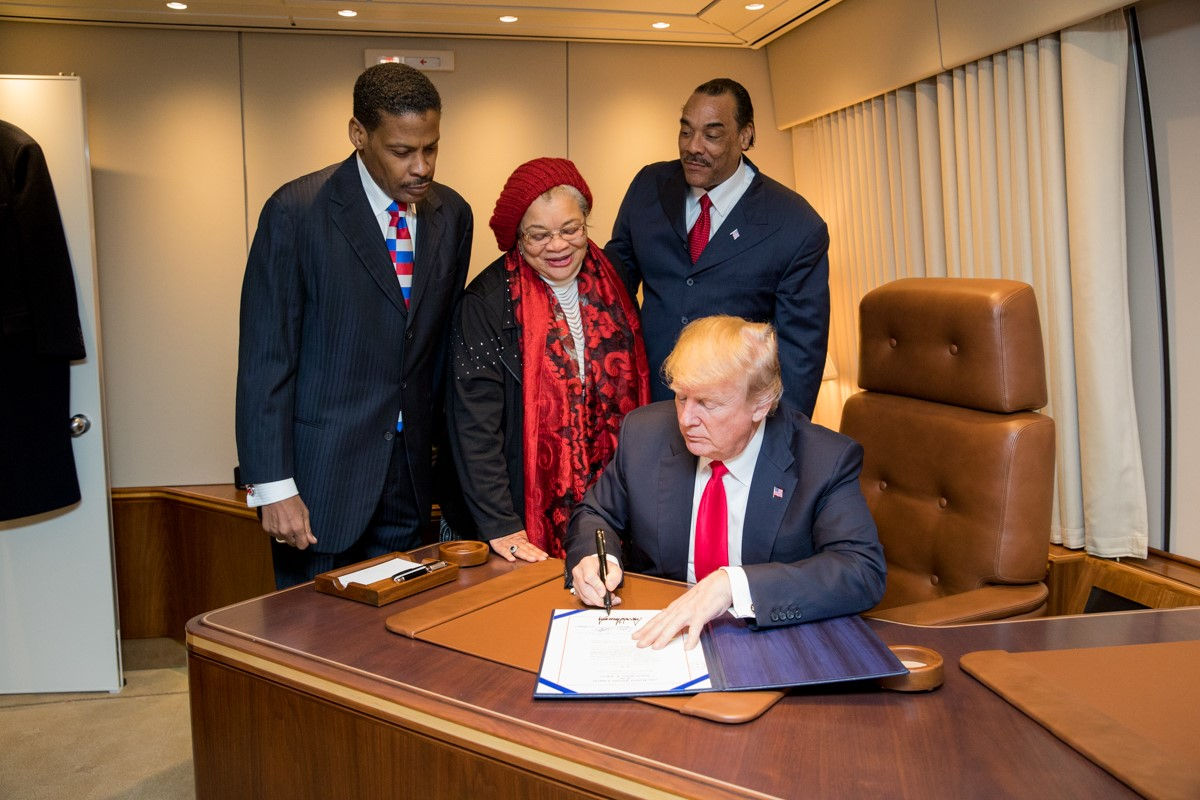
King with President Donald Trump in 2018

In 1984, King supported the Reverend Jesse Jackson for president.

In 2012, King was a supporter of Herman Cain for president. She co-founded Women for Cain.

King voted for Donald Trump in the 2016 presidential election.

For the 2020 presidential election, King was an advisory board member of Black Voices for Trump.

== Views and activism ==
Angela D. Dillard classifies King as among the most prominent black figures on the American religious right.

King is an anti-abortion activist. She had two abortions before changing her views following the birth of one of her children and her becoming a born-again Christian in 1983. King frames the issue as one of racial discrimination; she has referred to abortion as "womb-lynching" and accused Planned Parenthood of profiting from "aborting black babies." King is director of the activist group Civil Rights for the Unborn and is director of Priests for Life's African American outreach.

In 1996, she denounced her aunt Coretta Scott King for her support for abortion rights.

On September 22, 2020, King appeared in Birmingham, Alabama alongside political activists including Amie Beth Dickinson to present the Equality Proclamation. The document, signed on the 158th anniversary of the Emancipation Proclamation's signing, argued that the tactics and locations of abortion providers like Planned Parenthood were racially discriminatory. According to a document distributed by the group, King and the other signers believed that "the targeted practices of Alabama abortion providers are both discriminatory and disproportionately harmful to black mothers and their babies" and that a legal case could be made against abortion using the Tenth Amendment.

King spoke at Glenn Beck's Restoring Honor rally at the Lincoln Memorial in August 2010. In her speech, she expressed hope that "white privilege will become human privilege and that America will soon repent of the sin of racism and return itself to honor."

King has spoken out against same-sex marriage.

== Personal life ==
King is African-American. She has been married and divorced three times. Her first marriage was to Eddie Clifford Beal, her second marriage was to Jerry Ellis, and her third marriage was to Israel Tookes. She has six children.

== Works ==
King has written the following books:

- For generations to come: Poetry by Alveda King Beal (as Alveda King Beal) (1986)
- The Arab Heart (as Alveda King Beal) (1986)
- I Don't Want Your Man, I Want My Own (2001)
- Sons of Thunder: The King Family Legacy (2003)
- Who We Are in Christ Jesus (2008)
- How Can the Dream Survive If We Murder the Children?: Abortion is Not a Civil Right! (2008)
- King Rules: Ten Truths for You, Your Family, and Our Nation to Prosper (2014)
- King Truths: 21 Keys To Unlocking Your Spiritual Potential (2018)
- Why Trump? Memoirs of a Journey of Faith, Hope and Love (2020)
- We're Not Color Blind: Healing the Racial Divide (2020) (co-author Ginger Howard)

King produced the musical CD Let Freedom Ring in 2005. She has appeared in film and television as both Alveda King and Alveda King Beal. The Human Experience, a 2010 documentary film, featured commentary from King. She co-produced the video "Latter Rain" (2005) and co-executive-produced Pray for America (2015).

King portrayed Gaylee's mother in "Fifteen Forever" season 2, episode 19 of In the Heat of the Night, original air date April 25, 1989.

== See also ==
- Christine King Farris
- List of African-American Republicans
- Black conservatism in the United States
