= Stanley Levison =

American activist businessman, and lawyer (1912–1979)

- Born: Stanley David Levison; May 2, 1912; New York City, New York, U.S.
- Died: September 12, 1979 (aged 67); New York City, New York, U.S.
- Education: University of Michigan; Columbia University; New School; St. John's University (LLB, LLM)
- Occupations: Businessman, lawyer
- Known for: March on Washington; Poor People's Campaign
- Spouse: Beatrice Merkin
- Children: 1

Stanley David Levison (May 2, 1912 – September 12, 1979) was an American businessman and lawyer who became a lifelong activist in communist causes. He is best known as an advisor to and close friend of Martin Luther King Jr., for whom he helped write speeches, raise funds, and organize events.

== Early life ==
Levison was born in New York City on May 2, 1912, to a Jewish family. Levison attended the University of Michigan, Columbia University, and the New School for Social Research before earning his Bachelor of Laws and Master of Laws from St. John's University. While serving as treasurer of the American Jewish Congress in Manhattan, he aided in the defense of Julius and Ethel Rosenberg. During this period, he worked for a variety of leftist causes.

== Career ==
=== Civil Rights Movement ===
Levison was instrumental in all the activities of the Southern Christian Leadership Conference (SCLC), the organization established by Dr. King and other Southern black preachers to further the cause of civil rights. He had initially been introduced to King by Bayard Rustin, a Quaker, in New York City in 1956. Though King had offered to pay Levison in exchange for his help, Levison refused on every occasion, as he believed "the liberation struggle is the most positive and rewarding area of work anyone could experience."

Levison professionalized the fundraising of the organization and took on many of the publicity tasks, in addition to serving as Dr. King's literary agent. He was also a close adviser to Dr. King and a ghostwriter for him. Levison co-wrote with Clarence Benjamin Jones one of the drafts for Dr. King's "I Have a Dream" speech presented at the March on Washington for Jobs and Freedom on August 28, 1963. Some of Levison's conversations with Dr. King are reproduced verbatim from FBI wiretaps in Taylor Branch's biography of Dr. King, Parting the Waters: America in the King Years, 1954-63. Levison himself initiated the end of his public association with Dr. King in 1963, following the revelation to Dr. King's circle that Attorney General Robert F. Kennedy and then President John F. Kennedy had pressured Dr. King in person to break with Levison (and Jack O'Dell). But Levison continued to advise Dr. King privately until Dr. King's assassination in April 1968, and afterwards Levison continued to work with Dr. King's wife Coretta Scott King. The Poor People's Campaign in Washington, DC that took place from May 12 to June 24, 1968, was based on Levison's proposal.

Andrew Young stated, "Stan Levison was one of the closest friends Martin King and I ever had. Of all the unknown supporters of the civil rights movement, he was perhaps the most important." Coretta Scott King said, "Stanley Levison was more than one of my husband's most loyal and supportive friends. He was [a] trusted and dedicated adviser, a role he continued to play in support of my work at the Martin Luther King Jr. Center for Social Change."

=== Surveillance by the FBI ===
In the early 1950s, the FBI considered Levison to be a major financial coordinator for the Communist Party USA (CPUSA) and began to monitor his activities. The FBI had him under the surveillance of Jack and Morris Childs, two former CPUSA members who became FBI informants. According to the FBI, Levison's CPUSA activities ended in 1957. In 1978, one year before his death, Levison asserted "I was not nor am I now a member of the Communist Party."

He was questioned by the FBI twice, on February 9 and March 4, 1960. Two years later, on April 30, 1962, he was called to testify under subpoena at an executive session of the Senate Subcommittee on Internal Security, where he was represented by William Kunstler. Large parts of his testimony are still classified.

Although there was no evidence of Levison having further ties to the CPUSA, the FBI used his earlier communist history to justify wiretaps and bugs on his offices and the offices and hotel rooms of Martin Luther King. FBI Director J. Edgar Hoover had long associated the civil rights movement with communism, and he strongly expected that Levison would use or manipulate King to stimulate political unrest within the United States. In 2012, Tim Weiner wrote in his history of the FBI that Hoover believed Levison had "indoctrinated King in Marxist thought and subversive strategies", and that King was "part of Moscow's grand design to subvert the United States of America."

== Death ==
After suffering from cancer and diabetes, Levison died in 1979.

== Legacy ==
Levison's role as advisor and friend to King was portrayed by actor Steven Hill in King, a 1978 television miniseries. He was portrayed by Larry Keith in the 1983 miniseries Kennedy. He is also portrayed by Bruce Nozick in the 2016 television film All the Way. His name is mentioned in the 2011 biographical film J. Edgar.

Levison's role as advisor and friend to King was documented in the 2021 documentary film MLK/FBI, directed by Sam Pollard. The film is based on declassified FBI files and includes archival materials. NPR states, "As MLK/FBI explains, it's King's association with Stanley Levison, a progressive lawyer and businessman with Communist Party ties, that initially caught the attention of Hoover." The New Yorker review states, "Of particular interest to the Bureau was King’s close associate Stanley Levison, who had formerly harbored Communist sympathies and, as a treasurer in the American Jewish Congress, had supported the defense of the Rosenbergs. On the strength of such weak links, Robert Kennedy, the Attorney General, was asked to approve the covert wiretapping of King, which he authorized.

== Sources ==
- Taylor Branch, At Canaan's Edge: America in the King Years, 1965-68.
- Taylor Branch, Pillar of Fire: America in the King Years, 1963-65.
- Taylor Branch, Parting the Waters: America in the King Years, 1954-63.
- Ben Kamin, Dangerous Friendship: Stanley Levison, Martin Luther King, Jr., and the Kennedy Brothers. Michigan State University Press, 2014.
- Tim Weiner, Enemies: A History of the FBI. Random House, 2012.
