= Death and funeral of Coretta Scott King =

2006 funeral of American civil rights leader

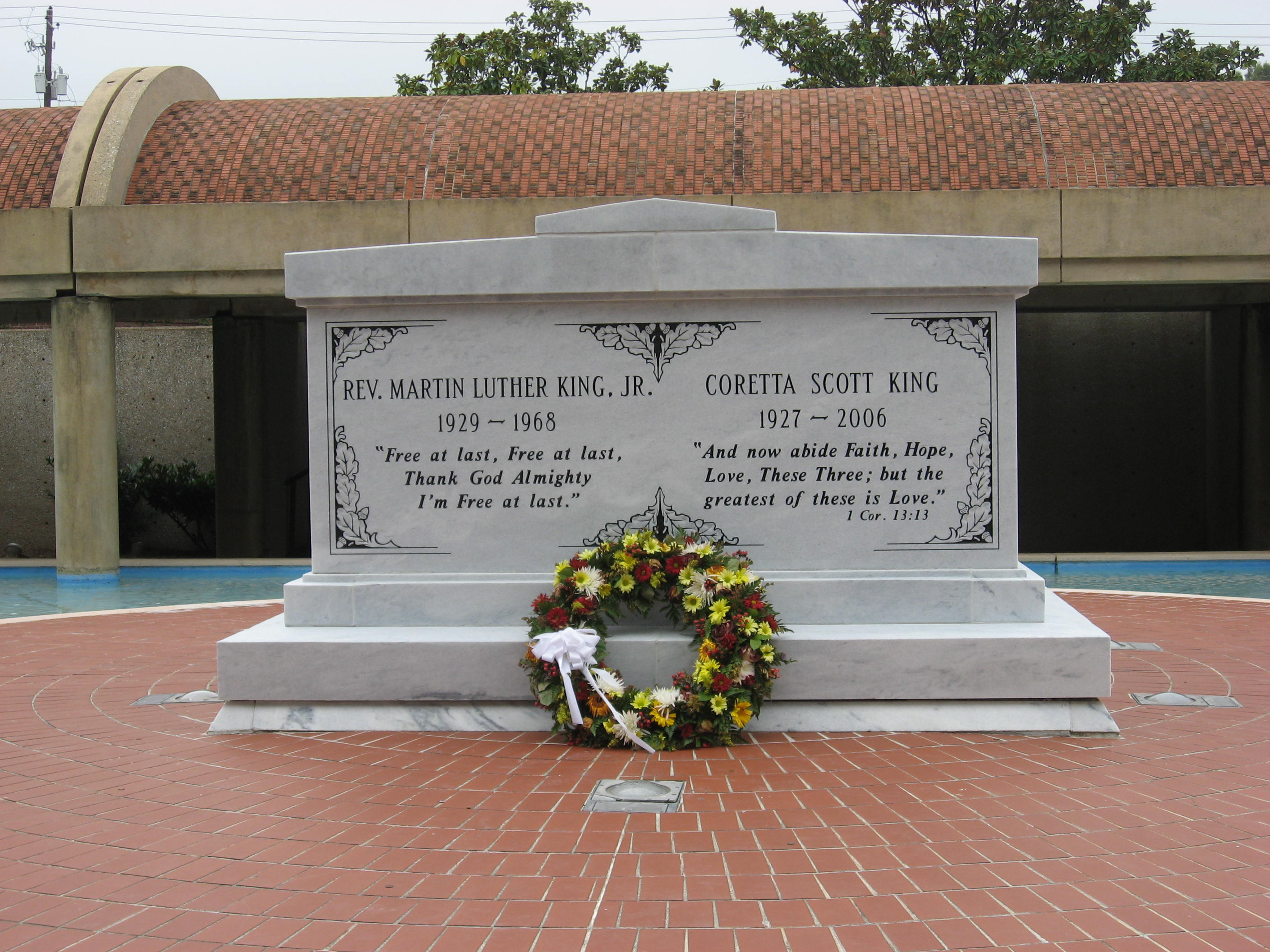
- Coretta Scott King and Martin Luther King Jr. sarcophagus at the Martin Luther King Jr. National Historic Site
- Location: New Birth Missionary Baptist Church, Lithonia, Georgia, USA
- Participants: George W. Bush; Jimmy Carter; George H. W. Bush; Bill Clinton

Coretta Scott King, the widow of civil rights leader Martin Luther King Jr., died on January 30, 2006, after arriving at a rehabilitation center in Rosarito, Baja California, Mexico. Her public funeral followed eight days later at the New Birth Missionary Baptist Church in her resident state of Georgia. In keeping with her personal wishes, King was entombed next to her husband in a crypt on the grounds of the King Center for Nonviolent Social Change.

King suffered strokes throughout the year 2005, and had different brushes with diseases, including a mild heart attack. The clinic where Ms. King received medical attention gained exposure surrounding her death. The media coverage was mostly negative, and ultimately the clinic was shut down. Prior to this, King had been released from Piedmont Hospital in Atlanta after regaining some of her speech. Nearly two weeks later, King signed into the clinic in Mexico where she would eventually die. She was seventy-eight years old.

== Death ==
Coretta Scott King died late on the evening of January 30, 2006 at the rehabilitation center in Rosarito Beach, Mexico, in the Oasis Hospital where she was undergoing holistic therapy for her stroke and advanced stage ovarian cancer. The main cause of her death is believed to be respiratory failure due to complications from ovarian cancer. The clinic at which she died was called the Hospital Santa Monica, but was licensed as Clinica Santo Tomas. Newspaper reports indicated that it was not legally licensed to "perform surgery, take X-rays, perform laboratory work or run an internal pharmacy, all of which it was doing." It was also founded, owned, and operated by San Diego resident and highly controversial alternative medicine figure Kurt Donsbach. Days after King's death, the Baja California, Mexico, state medical commissioner, Francisco Vera, shut down the clinic. On February 1, 2006, King's body was flown from Mexico to Atlanta.

=== Lying in state ===
On February 4, 2006, King's body was carried by a horse-drawn carriage to Georgia State Capitol, where she was laid out in honor. She was the first African-American and female to do so. Over 16,000 mourners paid their respects to King as they filed past her casket.

== Funeral ==
Over 14,000 people gathered for Coretta Scott King's eight-hour funeral at the New Birth Missionary Baptist Church in Lithonia, Georgia, on February 7, 2006, where daughter Bernice King, who is an elder at the church, eulogized her mother. The megachurch, whose sanctuary seats 10,000, was better able to handle the expected massive crowds than Ebenezer Baptist Church, of which King was a member since the early 1960s and which was the site of her husband's funeral in 1968.

U.S. Presidents George W. Bush, Bill Clinton, George H. W. Bush, Jimmy Carter, and their wives attended, with the exception of former First Lady Barbara Bush, who had a previous engagement. The Ford family was absent due to the illness of President Ford (who himself died later that year). George W. Bush canceled a previous engagement to speak about the federal budget in Manchester, New Hampshire, in order to attend the funeral. Numerous other prominent political and civil rights leaders, including then-U.S. senator Barack Obama, attended the televised service.

Prominent Georgian civil rights leader Julian Bond, an outspoken supporter of the rights of gays and lesbians, boycotted the service on the grounds that the King children had chosen an anti-gay megachurch as the venue. This was in conflict with their mother's longstanding support for the rights of gay and lesbian people.

King was interred in a temporary mausoleum on the grounds of the King Center until a permanent place next to her husband's remains could be built. She had expressed to family members and others that she wanted her remains to lie next to her husband's at the King Center. On November 20, 2006, the new above-ground memorial crypt containing both the bodies of Martin Luther and Coretta King was unveiled in front of friends and family. It is the third resting place of Martin Luther King Jr.

=== Funeral oration ===
President Jimmy Carter and Rev. Joseph Lowery provided funeral orations. With President George W. Bush seated a few feet away, Rev. Lowery, referencing Coretta's vocal opposition to the Iraq War, noted the failure to find weapons of mass destruction in Iraq:

"She deplored the terror inflicted by our smart bombs on missions way afar. . . . We know now there were no weapons of mass destruction over there. But Coretta knew, and we knew, that there are weapons of misdirection right down here. Millions without health insurance. Poverty abounds. For war, billions more, but no more for the poor."

President Carter, referencing Coretta's lifelong struggle for civil rights, noted that her family had been the target of secret government wiretapping. Their somewhat critical remarks about US government policy were met with thunderous applause and standing ovations. Conservative observers said Lowery's comments were inappropriate in a setting meant to honor the life of Mrs. King, especially considering that President George W. Bush was present at the ceremony.

== Reactions ==
- Author Maya Angelou, known for her novel I Know Why the Caged Bird Sings, said on ABC's Good Morning America that the morning of King's death was a "bleak morning for me and for many people and yet it's a great morning because we have a chance to look at her and see what she did and who she was. It's bleak because I can't — many of us can't hear her sweet voice — but it's great because she did live, and she was ours. I mean African-Americans and white Americans and Asians, Spanish-speaking — she belonged to us and that's a great thing."
- Andrew Young, former Mayor of Atlanta who reported her death on NBC's Today, commented on King's strength and, in comparison to her husband's, said: "She was strong if not stronger than he was. She lived a graceful and beautiful life, and in spite of all of the difficulties, she managed a graceful and beautiful passing."
- Then-U.S. Senator Barack Obama said, "Coretta Scott King died in her sleep, but she certainly was not alone. She was joined by the companionship and support of a loving family and a grateful nation — inspired by her cause, dedicated to her work, and mourning of her passing. My thoughts and condolences today are with her children, and may she and her husband now rest in eternal peace."
- Then-President George W. Bush said in response to her death: "Mrs. King was a remarkable and courageous woman, and a great civil rights leader. Mrs. King's lasting contributions to freedom and equality have made America a better and more compassionate nation."
- Secretary of State Condoleezza Rice issued a statement reporting "the United States and the world have lost a champion of human rights. Mrs. King was one of the pioneers in our country's fight for equality and justice for all its citizens. Her courageous stand alongside Dr. King during a time of tremendous struggle for America was one of our greatest examples of selfless dedication to the good of all Americans."
- Civil rights activist Jesse Jackson said, "she learned to function with pain and keep serving. So her legacy is secure as a freedom fighter, but her work remains unfinished."
- Reverend Al Sharpton commented, "The loss of Coretta Scott King is a monumental loss to the nation and the world at large. She was truly the first lady of the human rights movement."
