= Death of a Prophet =

- Genre: Drama; History
- Written by: Woodie King Jr.
- Directed by: Woodie King Jr.
- Starring: Morgan Freeman
- Theme music composer: Max Roach
- Country of origin: United States
- Original language: English

Production
- Editor: Charles Sessoms
- Running time: 60 mins

Original release
- Release: June 2, 1981

Death of a Prophet is a 1981 television film, written and directed by Woodie King Jr., and starring Morgan Freeman as Malcolm X.

== Cast ==
- Morgan Freeman as Malcolm X
- Yolanda King as Betty Shabazz
- Ossie Davis as himself
- Yuri Kochiyama as herself
- Amiri Baraka as himself

== Reception ==
The Pittsburgh Post-Gazette said that the film "will stimulate discussion, but it won't shed any light on the [assassination] itself ... To say Death of a Prophet takes liberties with the facts is an understatement, but the degree to which it does can be a bit irritating at times ... Still, the film manages to capture an essential truth—Malcolm X was perceived in some circles and our government as a dangerous man because of his eloquence, self-discipline and unswerving dedication to black liberation."

Leonard Maltin's Movie Guide called the film a "low-budget but involving drama (with some documentary scenes) about the last day in the life of a black American leader. He's clearly supposed to be Malcolm X, though that name is not mentioned. Freeman is excellent, and the film's documentary style is effective."
