= Alfred Daniel King =

American Baptist minister (1930–1969)

- Born: Alfred Daniel King; July 30, 1930; Atlanta, Georgia, U.S.
- Died: July 21, 1969 (aged 38); Atlanta, Georgia, U.S.
- Other name: Alfred King
- Education: Morehouse College (BA)
- Spouse: Naomi Ruth Barber King (m. 1950)
- Children: 5, including Alveda
- Parents: Martin Luther King Sr.; Alberta Williams King
- Relatives: Martin Luther King Jr. (brother); Christine King Farris (sister); Yolanda King (niece); Martin III (nephew); Dexter King (nephew); Bernice King (niece)

Alfred Daniel King (July 30, 1930 – July 21, 1969) was an American Baptist minister and civil rights activist. He was the younger son of Martin Luther King Sr. and the younger brother of Martin Luther King Jr.

== Early life ==
Alfred Daniel King was born July 30, 1930, in Atlanta, Georgia. He was a son of Reverend Martin Luther King (1899–1984), and Alberta Williams King (1903–1974), the youngest of their three children (the other two being Willie Christine King, born September 11, 1927, and Martin Luther King Jr., born January 15, 1929). He and his siblings were disciplined with whippings by their father as young children. In contrast to his peacemaking brother, Martin, A. D.—according to his father—was "a little rough at times" and "let his toughness build a reputation throughout our neighborhood." Less interested in academics than his siblings, King started a family of his own while still a teenager and attended college later in life. He was married on June 17, 1950, to Naomi Ruth Barber King (November 17, 1931-March 7, 2024), with whom he had five children: Alveda, Alfred Jr., Derek, Darlene, and Vernon.

As a youth, King had strongly resisted his father's ministerial urgings, but he eventually began assisting his father at Ebenezer Baptist Church. In 1959, King graduated from Morehouse College. That same year, he left Ebenezer Baptist to become pastor of Mount Vernon First Baptist Church in Newnan, Georgia.

== Involvement in the Civil Rights Movement ==
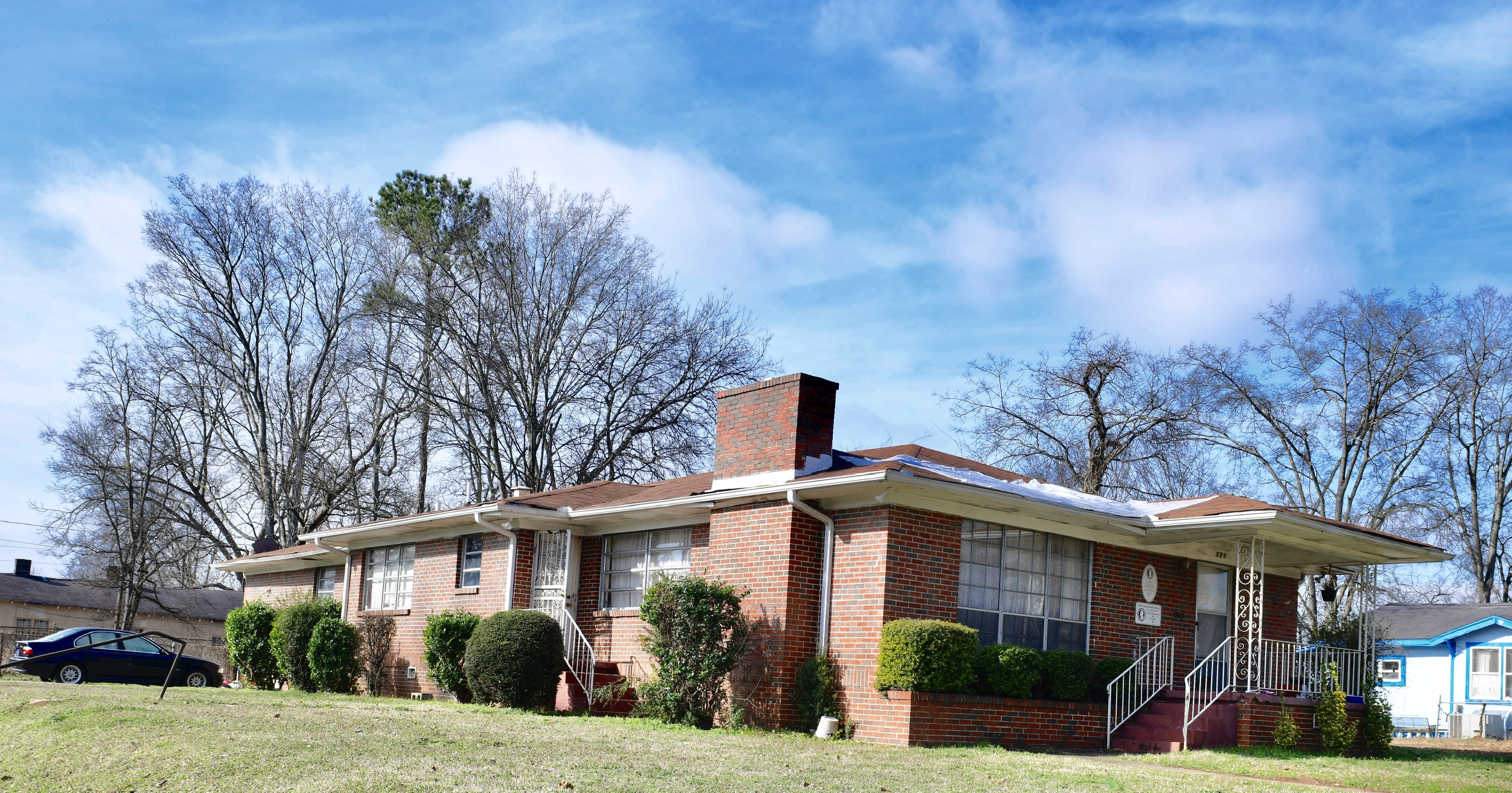
A. D. King House, Birmingham, Alabama

King was arrested, along with his older brother Martin and 70 others, while participating in an October 1960 lunch-counter sit-in in Atlanta. In 1963, King became a leader of the Birmingham campaign, while pastoring at First Baptist Church of Ensley in Birmingham, Alabama. On May 11, 1963, King's house was bombed. In August, after a bomb exploded at the home of a prominent black lawyer in downtown Birmingham, outraged citizens, intent on revenge, poured into the streets. While rocks were being thrown at gathering policemen and the situation escalated, King climbed on top of a parked car and shouted to the rioters in an attempt to quell their fury: "My friends, we have had enough problems tonight. If you're going to kill someone, then kill me; ... Stand up for your rights, but with nonviolence."

Like his brother, King was a staunch believer in the importance of maintaining nonviolence in direct action campaigns. However, unlike his brother, King remained mostly outside the media spotlight. As one of his associates said, "Not being in the limelight never seemed to affect him, but because he stayed in the background, many people never knew that he was deeply involved, too." King was involved in the Selma demonstrations (Bloody Sunday) and participated in the Poor People's Campaign: "Operation Food Basket and the sanitation living wage campaign, March in Washington and many more". King tended to stay in his brother's shadow, and many people never even knew that Martin Luther King Jr. had a brother. He supported his brother throughout the movement but never took the limelight away from him. King's side office at Zion Baptist Church in Louisville, Kentucky was bombed on August 26, 1968.

King often traveled with his brother, and was in Memphis on April 4, 1968, when his brother was shot. King was in the room directly beneath Martin's at the Lorraine Hotel when the gun blast went off, and when King saw his brother lying mortally wounded, King had to be restrained by others due to the shock and overwhelming emotion that he was experiencing.

== Later life ==
For the last part of his life, King suffered from alcoholism and depression. In 1965, he moved to Louisville, Kentucky, where he became pastor at Zion Baptist Church. While there, King continued to fight for civil rights and was successful in a 1968 campaign for an open housing ordinance, which is today a component of the Fair Housing Act of 1968. After his brother's assassination in April 1968, there was speculation that King might become the president of the Southern Christian Leadership Conference (SCLC). However, King made no effort to assume his deceased brother's role, although he did continue to be active in the Poor People's Campaign and in other work on behalf of SCLC.

After Martin's death, King returned to Ebenezer Baptist Church, where, in September 1968, he was installed as co-pastor. King was praised by his father as "an able preacher, a concerned, loving pastor".

== Death ==
On July 21, 1969, nine days before his 39th birthday, King was found dead in the swimming pool at his home. The cause of his death was listed as an accidental drowning. However, it is likely that the stress of his brother's high-profile activist work and the trauma of his assassination exacerbated King's heart problems (a rumor disclaimed by his wife Naomi Ruth Barber King), of which there was a family history: three of A.D.'s children later died of heart attacks—Alfred Jr. at age 34 in 1986, Darlene at age 20 in 1976, and Vernon at age 49 in 2009; his father, Martin Sr., also died of a heart attack in 1984; his niece, Yolanda King, died of a chronic heart condition at age 51 in 2007.

King's father said in his autobiography, "Alveda had been up the night before, she said, talking with her father and watching a television movie with him. He'd seemed unusually quiet...and not very interested in the film. But he had wanted to stay up and Alveda left him sitting in an easy chair, staring at the TV, when she went off to bed... I had questions about A.D.'s death and I still have them now. He was a good swimmer. Why did he drown? I don't know – I don't know that we will ever know what happened." King's widow, Naomi, said, "There is no doubt in my mind that the system killed my husband. My Boaz was murdered."
