= Yolanda R. King =

American activist (born 2008)

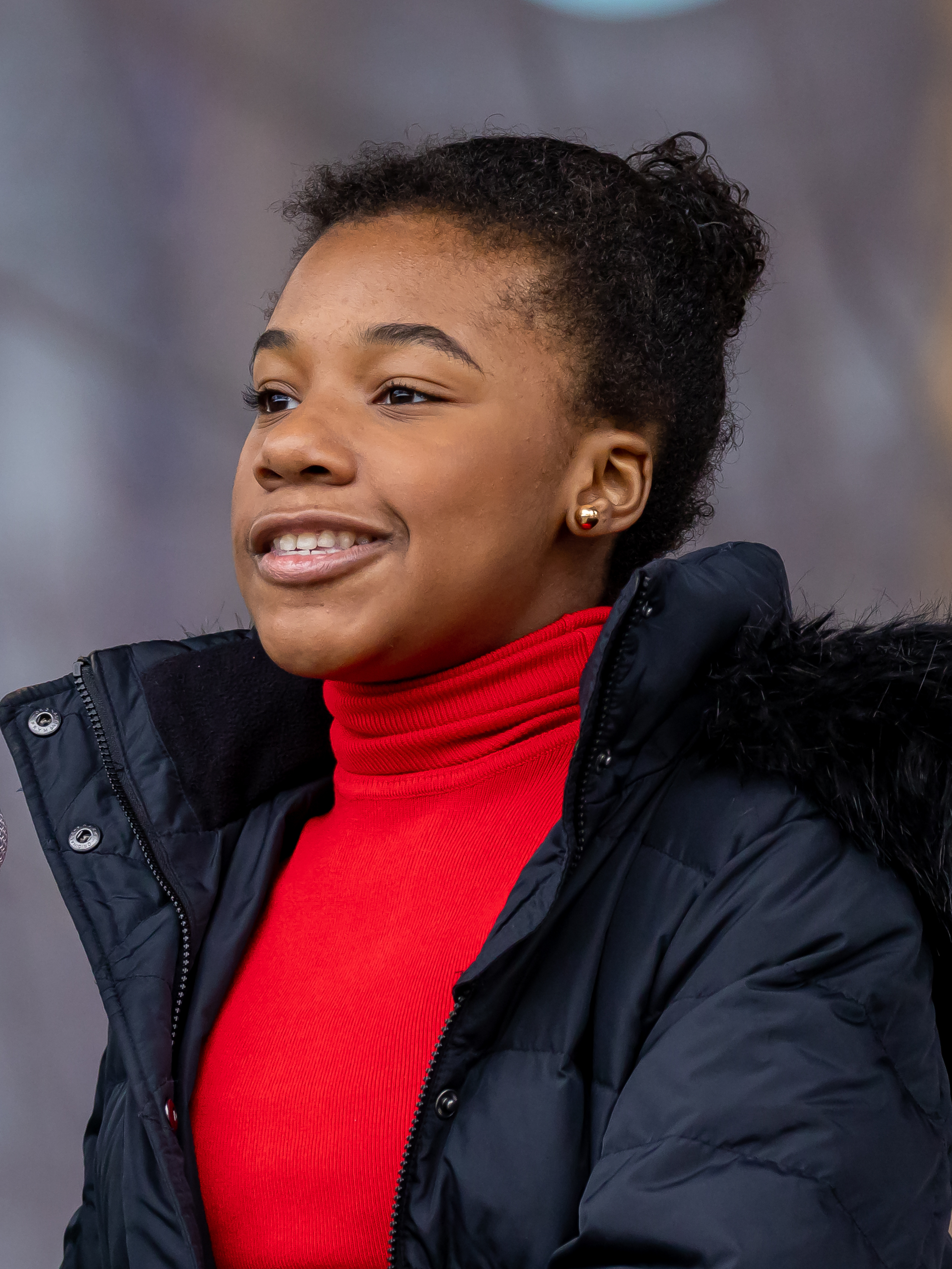
- King in 2023
- Born: Yolanda Renee King; May 25, 2008 (age 18); Atlanta, Georgia, U.S
- Education: Atlanta International School
- Occupations: Activist; Author
- Years active: 2018–present
- Parents: Martin Luther King III (father); Arndrea Waters King (mother)

Yolanda Renee King (born May 25, 2008) is an American activist, author and the only grandchild of Martin Luther King Jr. Born in Atlanta, she became an activist in childhood, addressing an end to gun violence within the United States in 2018, and publishing a book dedicated to her grandfather.

== Early life and education ==
Yolanda King was born on May 25, 2008, in Atlanta, Georgia to parents Martin Luther King III, the son of Martin Luther King Jr, and Arndrea Waters King. She was named after her aunt with the same name in honor of her.

In the spring of 2026, she graduated from the Atlanta International School. She became immersed in activism growing up.

She then enrolled at Columbia University to study political science.

== Career ==
In 2018, at age 10, she spoke at a nationally televised March for Our Lives rally in Washington, DC about ending gun violence. She continued fighting for the cause in August 2020.

In May 2022, Yolanda wrote an op-ed for The Washington Post about her generation standing up to gun violence and putting an end to it.

In January 2023, at age 14, she gave a well-received 30-minute speech at Clemson University in which she cited her grandfather's legacy while urging her generation to take action on social issues even if they are still too young to vote.

In August 2023, she addressed a crowd during the 60th Anniversary of the March on Washington and declared that her generation would be "defined by action, not apathy".

=== We Dream a World ===
In January 2024 she published a children's book titled We Dream a World: Carrying the Light from My Grandparents. The book focused on her grandfather and his contributions and was written in favor of young people creating a "better world".
