= King Center for Nonviolent Social Change =

Not-for-profit organization in Atlanta, Georgia, United States

Martin Luther King Jr. Center for Nonviolent Social Change

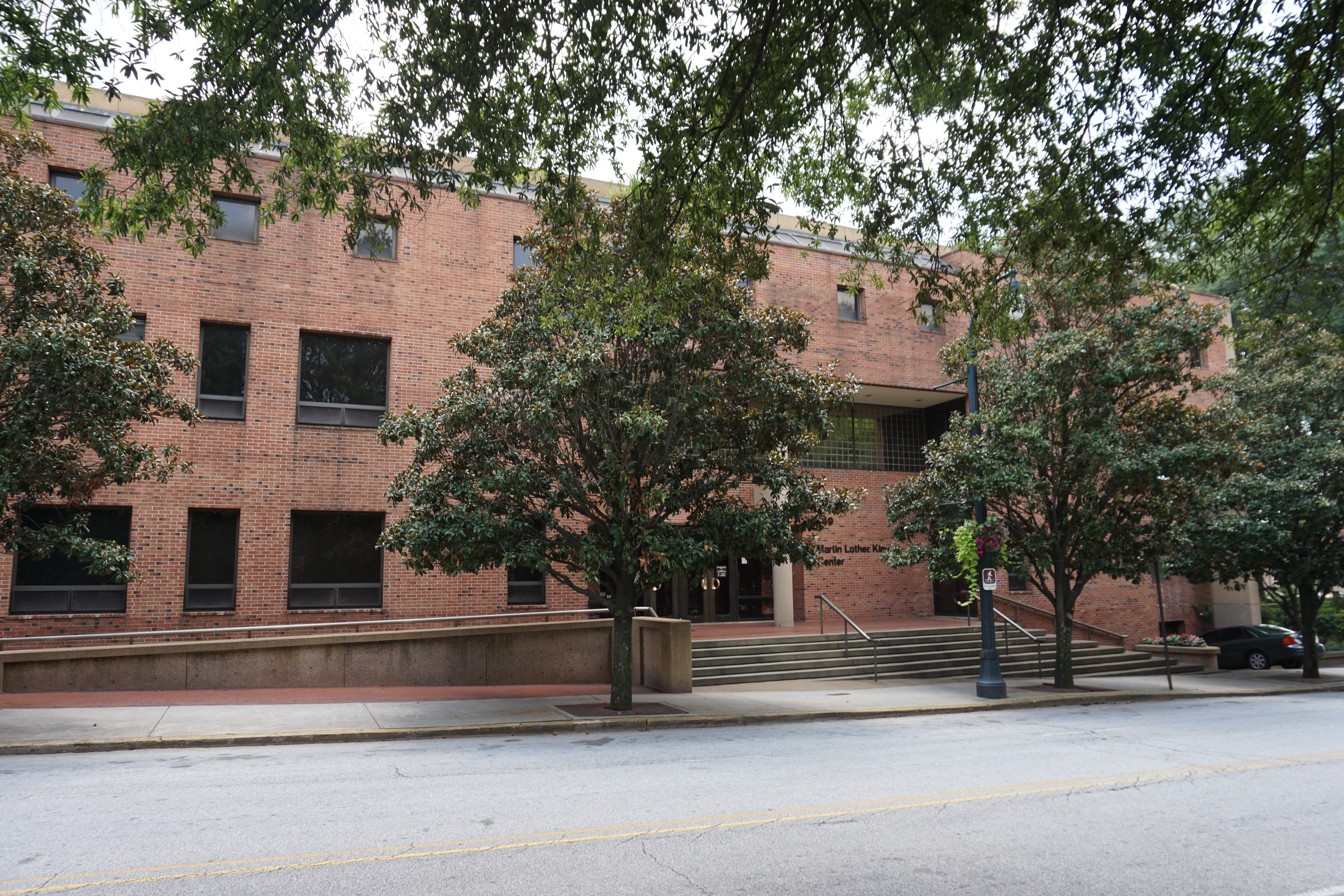
- Founded: 1968; 58 years ago
- Founder: Coretta Scott King
- Purpose: Nonviolent Social Change
- Location: Atlanta
- President: Bernice King
- Website: thekingcenter.org

The Martin Luther King Jr. Center for Nonviolent Social Change, commonly known as The King Center, is a non-governmental, not-for-profit organization established in 1968, based in Atlanta, Georgia.

== History ==
The King Center is a 501(c) (3) organization which was founded in 1968 by Coretta Scott King, who started the organization in the basement of the couple's home in the year following the assassination of her husband in 1968.

In 1981, the organization's headquarters were moved into the Martin Luther King Jr. National Historical Park facility on Auburn Avenue which includes King's birth home and the Ebenezer Baptist Church, where he preached from 1960 until his death.

In 1994, Dexter King succeeded his mother as director of the organization. In 2010, Martin Luther King III became president. In 2012, King's youngest child, Bernice King, became the organization's CEO.

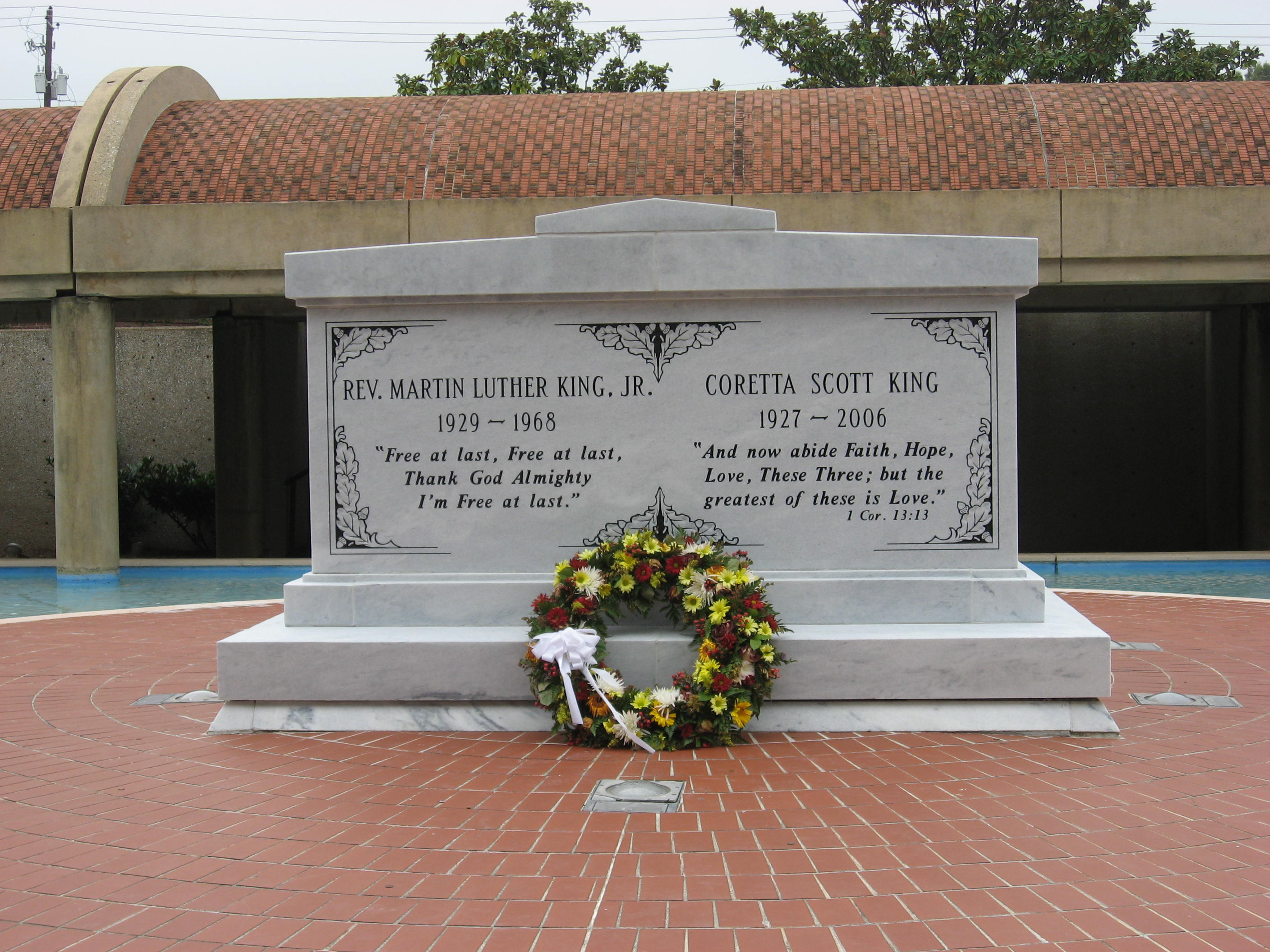
Martin Luther King Jr. and Coretta Scott King Tomb in the Sweet Auburn district, preserved at the Martin Luther King Jr. National Historical Park.

== Programs ==
The King Center provides research, education and training programs on the principles, philosophy and methods of nonviolence.

== Awards ==
The Martin Luther King Jr. Nonviolent Peace Prize is awarded by The King Center. A non-exhaustive list of recipients includes: Cesar Chavez (1973); Stanley Levison and Kenneth Kaunda (1978); Rosa Parks (1980); Martin Luther King Sr. and Richard Attenborough (1983); Corazon Aquino (1987); Mikhail Gorbachev (1991); and, on April 4, 2018 – the 50th anniversary of King's assassination – Ben Ferencz and Bryan Stevenson.

The organization also awards the Martin Luther King, Jr. Social Justice Award.
