= Martin Luther King Sr. =

American Baptist preacher (1899–1984)

The Reverend Martin Luther King Sr.
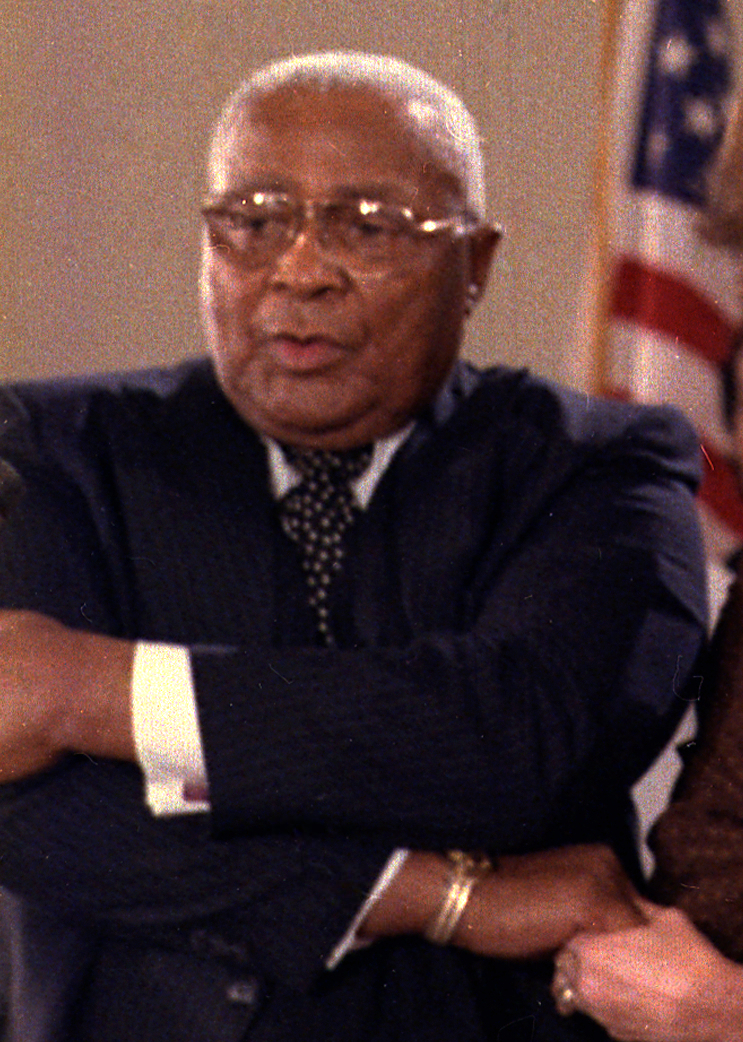
- King in 1979
- Born: Michael King; December 19, 1899; Stockbridge, Georgia, U.S.
- Died: November 11, 1984 (aged 84); Atlanta, Georgia, U.S.
- Burial place: South-View Cemetery
- Other name: Daddy King
- Education: Morehouse College (ThB)
- Occupations: Pastor; activist
- Known for: Father of Martin Luther King Jr.
- Spouse: Alberta Williams (m. 1926; died 1974)
- Children: Christine; Martin Jr.; Alfred
- Parents: James Albert King; Delia Linsey

Martin Luther King (born Michael King; December 19, 1899 – November 11, 1984), commonly known as Daddy King, was an American Baptist pastor, missionary, and civil rights activist who was an early figure in the civil rights movement. He served as the senior pastor of Atlanta's Ebenezer Baptist Church from 1931 to 1975, and was also the father of the civil rights leader Martin Luther King Jr., and grandfather of a former head of the Southern Christian Leadership Conference Martin Luther King III.

== Biography ==
Martin Luther King was born Michael King in Stockbridge, Georgia, the son of Delia (née Linsey; 1875–1924) and James Albert King (1864–1933).

King was a member of the Floyd Chapel Baptist Church and decided to become a preacher after being inspired by ministers who were prepared to stand up for racial equality. He was boarding with the Reverend A. D. Williams, then pastor of the Ebenezer Baptist Church. After King started courting Williams' daughter, Alberta, her family encouraged King to finish his education and to become a preacher. King completed his high school education at Bryant Preparatory School, and began to preach in several black churches in Atlanta.

In 1925, King began to study theology at the Morehouse College, while working daytime as a mechanic's helper and railroad fireman. He obtained a Bachelor of Theology in 1931.

=== Ministry ===
In 1927, King became assistant pastor at the Ebenezer Baptist Church of Atlanta, then senior pastor in 1931. With the country in the midst of the Great Depression, church finances were struggling, but King organized membership and fundraising drives that restored these to health. By 1934, he had become a widely respected leader of the local church. That same year, King also changed his name, and that of his eldest son, from Michael King to Martin Luther King after a period of gradual transition on his own part.

King was inspired during a trip to Germany for that year's meeting of the Baptist World Alliance (BWA). While visiting sites associated with reformation leader Martin Luther, attendees also witnessed the rise of Nazism. Whilst the BWA conference issued a resolution condemning antisemitism, the senior King gained deepened appreciation for the power of Luther's protest.

King was the pastor of the Ebenezer Baptist Church for four decades, wielding great influence in the black community and earning some degree of respect from the white community. He also broadcast on WAEC, a religious radio station in Atlanta.

King became a local leader of the civil rights movement, serving on the executive committee of the NAACP chapter in Atlanta and the Civic and Political League as an officer. He encouraged his son to become active in the movement.

In his 1950 essay An Autobiography of Religious Development, King Jr. wrote that his father was a major influence on his entering the ministry, stating, "I guess the influence of my father also had a great deal to do with my going in the ministry. This is not to say that he ever spoke to me in terms of being a minister, but that my admiration for him was the great moving factor; He set forth a noble example that I didn't mind following."

King Jr. often recounted that his father frequently sent him to work in the fields. King Jr. said that in this way, he would gain a healthier respect for his forefathers.

In his autobiography, King Jr. remembered his father leaving a shoe shop because he and his son were asked to change seats. King Jr. said, "This was the first time I had seen Dad so furious. That experience revealed to me at a very early age that my father had not adjusted to the system, and he played a great part in shaping my conscience. I still remember walking down the street beside him as he muttered, 'I don't care how long I have to live with this system, I will never accept it.'"

Another story related by King Jr. was that once the car his father was driving was stopped by a police officer, and the officer addressed the senior King as "boy". King Sr. pointed to his son and said, "This is a boy, I am a man, and until you call me one, I will not listen to you."

King Jr. became an associate pastor at Ebenezer in 1948, and his father wrote a letter of recommendation for him to attend the Crozer Theological Seminary in Chester, Pennsylvania. King Sr. also made arrangement for King Jr. to work with J. Pius Barbour, a family friend who pastored at Calvary Baptist Church in Chester. Despite theological differences, father and son would later serve together as joint pastors at the church.

King was a major figure in the civil rights movement in Georgia, where he rose to become the head of the NAACP in Atlanta and the Civic and Political League. King led the fight for equal teachers' salaries in Atlanta and played an instrumental role in ending Jim Crow laws in the state. King had refused to ride on Atlanta's bus system since the 1920s after a vicious attack on black passengers with no action against those responsible. King stressed the need for an educated, politically active black ministry.

In October 1960, when King Jr. was arrested at a peaceful sit-in in Atlanta, Robert F. Kennedy, brother and aide to the Democratic presidential nominee John F. Kennedy, telephoned the judge and helped secure his release. Although King Sr. had previously opposed John Kennedy because he was a Catholic, King Jr. expressed his appreciation for these calls and switched his support to Kennedy. Until this time, King Sr. had been a lifelong registered Republican, and had endorsed Republican Richard Nixon before switching to endorse Kennedy.

King Jr. soon became a popular civil rights activist. Taking inspiration from Mahatma Gandhi of India, he led nonviolent protests in order to win greater rights for African Americans.

King Jr. was assassinated on April 4, 1968. King Sr.'s younger son, Alfred Daniel Williams King, died under mysterious circumstances that authorities labeled an accidental drowning on July 21, 1969, nine days before his 39th birthday.

In 1969, King was one of several members of the Morehouse College board of trustees held hostage on the campus by a group of students demanding reform in the school's curriculum and governance. One of the students was Samuel L. Jackson, who was suspended for his actions. Jackson subsequently became an actor and Academy Award nominee.

In 1975, Jimmy Carter, the Democratic candidate for president for the 1976 election, sought King's support. He replied that he would only accept if (Republican) Vice President Nelson Rockefeller was not a candidate, because of the latter's positive civil rights reputation. Since Rockefeller was not a candidate, King accepted. He notably defended Carter's general record in African-American churches and in the press, after the latter made awkward remarks. He was asked to say a prayer at the Democratic National Convention in 1976 and 1980.

In 1980, King published his autobiography.

== Personal life ==
On Thanksgiving Day in 1926, after eight years of courtship, King married Alberta in the Ebenezer Church. The couple had three children in four years: Willie Christine King (1927–2023), Martin Luther King Jr. (born Michael King Jr., 1929–1968), and Alfred Daniel Williams King (1930–1969). He regularly whipped his three children as a form of physical discipline for minor infractions.

King Sr.'s wife and King Jr.'s mother, Alberta, was assassinated by Marcus Wayne Chenault on Sunday, June 30, 1974, at the Ebenezer Baptist Church during Sunday services. Chenault was a 23-year-old Black man from Ohio who had adopted the theology of the Black Hebrew Israelites. While Alberta was playing "The Lord's Prayer" on the church organ, Chenault stood up and yelled, "You are serving a false god", and fired his gun at her. Upon capture, the assassin disclosed that his intended target was Martin Luther King Sr., who was elsewhere that Sunday. After failing to see King Sr., he instead targeted Alberta King and the Rev. Edward Boykin. Chenault stated that he was driven to murder after concluding that "Black ministers were a menace to Black people" and that "all Christians are his enemies".

King died of a heart attack at the Crawford W. Long Hospital in Atlanta on November 11, 1984; he was 84 years old. King was interred next to his wife at the South-View Cemetery in Atlanta.

== Awards and honors ==
In 1975, King received a doctorate of humane letters (doctorate honoris causa) from Dillard University.

== See also ==
- Martin Luther King III, King's grandson
- Alveda King, granddaughter
- Yolanda King, granddaughter
- Dexter King, grandson
- Bernice King, granddaughter
