= Christine King Farris =

American civil rights leader (1927–2023)

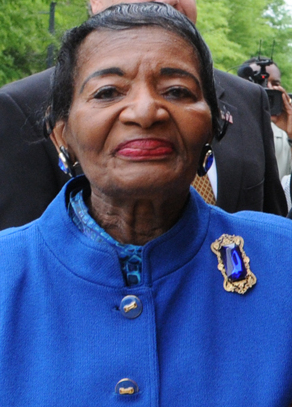
- King in 2011
- Born: Willie Christine King; September 11, 1927; Atlanta, Georgia, U.S.
- Died: June 29, 2023 (aged 95); Atlanta, Georgia, U.S.
- Education: Spelman College (BA); Columbia University (MA, MA)
- Known for: Civil rights, teaching, public service
- Spouse: Newton Farris Sr. (m. 1960; died 2017)
- Children: 2
- Parents: Alberta Williams King; Martin Luther King Sr.
- Family: Martin Luther King Jr. (brother); A. D. King (brother); James Albert King (grandfather); Martin Luther King III (nephew); Bernice King (niece)

Willie Christine King Farris (September 11, 1927 – June 29, 2023) was an American teacher and civil rights activist. King was the sister of Martin Luther King Jr. and Alfred Daniel King. She taught at Spelman College and was the author of several books and was a public speaker on various topics, including the King family, multicultural education, and teaching.

== Education and career ==
Like her mother and grandmother before her, King Farris attended Spelman College in Atlanta, where she earned a bachelor's degree in economics in 1948. She wanted to continue her studies at the University of Georgia but it did not admit Black students at the time. King Farris then attended Columbia University in New York and received a master's degree in social foundations of education in 1950. She earned a second master's degree in special education in 1958.

King Farris got her first professional job as a teacher at W.H. Crogman Elementary School in Atlanta in 1950. The school primarily served students from black low-income households. In 1958, she returned to her Alma Mater as director of the Freshman Reading Program at Spelman College. In time, she became professor of education and director of the Learning Resources Center there. When she retired in 2014, she had served Spelman for 56 years.

King Farris was, for many years, vice chair and treasurer of the King Center for Nonviolent Social Change and was active for several years in the International Reading Association, and various church and civic organizations, including the National Association for the Advancement of Colored People and the Southern Christian Leadership Conference. Farris also published a children's book, My Brother Martin, as well as her autobiography, Through It All: Reflections on My Life, My Family, and My Faith, in 2009.

== Family ==
Born in Atlanta on September 11, 1927, King Farris was the first child and only daughter of Rev. Martin Luther King Sr. and Alberta Williams King, and was the elder sister of Rev. Martin Luther King Jr. and A. D. King. She and her two brothers were disciplined with whippings by their father as young children. The three siblings spent their early years in the home of their grandfather, Alfred Daniel Williams, who died on March 21, 1931. She married Isaac Newton Farris Sr. on August 19, 1960. They had two children: Isaac Newton Farris Jr., and Angela Christine Farris Watkins.

King Farris endured the 1968 assassination of her brother, the 1969 accidental drowning of her brother A. D., and the 1974 assassination of her mother. King Farris did not return to Memphis, Tennessee, since traveling there after her brother's assassination to retrieve his body. She later attended the 2006 funeral of her sister-in-law Coretta Scott King and the 2007 funeral of niece Yolanda King. In an interview with CNN, King Farris said she would not attend an April 2008 event marking the 40th anniversary of her brother's assassination, because the painful memories of her last visit to Memphis still haunted her. Her husband, Isaac Newton Farris Sr., died on December 30, 2017, at the age of 83.

== Death ==
King Farris's death was announced by her family attorney, Antavius Weems. Farris died in Atlanta on June 29, 2023, at the age of 95. At the time of her death, Farris was the last living sibling of Martin Luther King Jr.
