= Alberta Williams King =

Mother of Martin Luther King Jr. (1904–1974)

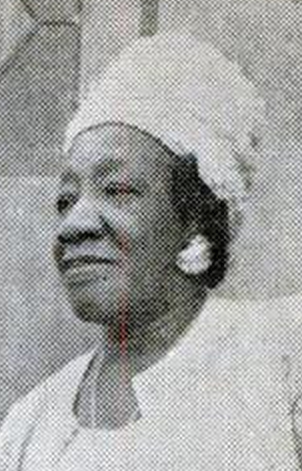
- King in 1962
- Born: Alberta Christine Williams; September 13, 1904; Atlanta, Georgia, U.S.
- Died: June 30, 1974 (aged 69); Atlanta, Georgia, U.S.
- Cause of death: Murder
- Resting place: South-View Cemetery
- Education: Hampton University; Morris Brown College (BA)
- Spouse: Martin Luther King Sr. (m. 1926)
- Children: Christine; Martin Jr.; Alfred

Alberta Christine Williams King (née Williams; September 13, 1904 – June 30, 1974) was an American civil rights organizer best known as the wife of Martin Luther King Sr.; and as the mother of Martin Luther King Jr., and also as the grandmother of Martin Luther King III. She was the choir director of the Ebenezer Baptist Church. She was shot and killed in the church by 23-year-old Marcus Wayne Chenault six years after the assassination of her eldest son Martin Luther King Jr.

== Early life, education and family ==
Alberta Christine Williams was born on September 13, 1904. Her parents were Reverend Adam Daniel Williams, at the time preacher of the Ebenezer Baptist Church in Atlanta, Georgia, and Jennie Celeste (Parks) Williams. Alberta Williams graduated from high school at the Spelman Seminary, and earned a teaching certificate at the Hampton Normal and Industrial Institute, now Hampton University in 1924.

Williams met Martin L. King, then known as Michael King, whose sister Woodie was boarding with her parents, shortly before she left for Hampton. After graduating, she announced her engagement to King at the Ebenezer Baptist Church. She taught for a short time before their Thanksgiving Day 1926 wedding, but she had to quit because the local school board prohibited married women from teaching.

After their wedding, the newly married couple moved into an upstairs bedroom at the Williams family home, which is where all three of their children were born. The King family lived in the home until King's mother's death from a heart attack in 1941, when Martin Jr. turned 12 years old. In 1980, the home was designated for preservation as part of the Martin Luther King Jr. National Historical Park. The house the family moved to was located nearby. It has since been torn down.

The King's first child, daughter Willie Christine King, was born on September 11, 1927. Michael King, Jr., followed on January 15, 1929, then Alfred Daniel Williams King, named after his grandfather, on July 30, 1930. About this time, Michael King changed his name to Martin Luther King Sr.

Alberta King worked hard to instill self-respect into her children. Martin Luther King Jr., wrote an essay while he studied at Crozer Seminary stating that she "was behind the scenes setting forth those motherly cares, the lack of which leaves a missing link in life."

During this period King continued her studies at Morris Brown College, receiving a BA in 1938.

== Career ==
King founded the Ebenezer choir and served as church organist from 1932 to 1972. Her work as organist and as director at Ebenezer is considered to have contributed deeply to the respect her son had for music. She served as choir director for nearly 25 years, leaving for only a brief period in the early 1960s to accompany her son and assist him with his work. She returned to the position in 1963 and continued in the role until "retiring" in 1972.

In addition to the choir, Alberta would also serve as the organizer and president of the Ebenezer Women's Committee from 1950 to 1962. By the end of this period, Martin Luther King Sr. and Jr. were joint pastors of the church.

Outside of her work at Ebenezer, King was the organist for the Women's Auxiliary of the National Baptist Convention from 1950 to 1962. She was also active in the YWCA, the National Association for the Advancement of Colored People (NAACP), and the Women's International League for Peace and Freedom.

== Family tragedies, 1968–1969 ==
King Jr. was assassinated on April 4, 1968, while standing on the balcony of the Lorraine Motel in Memphis. King was in Memphis to lead a march in support of the local sanitation workers' union. He was pronounced dead one hour later. Mrs. King, a source of strength following her son's assassination, faced fresh tragedy the next year when her younger son and last-born child, Alfred Daniel Williams King, who had become the assistant pastor at Ebenezer Baptist Church, drowned in his pool.

== Murder and aftermath ==
Alberta King was shot and killed on June 30, 1974, age 69, by Marcus Wayne Chenault, a 23-year-old man from Ohio. Chenault's mentor, Hananiah E. Israel, a Black Hebrew Israelite preacher who rejected the New Testament, castigated Black civil rights activists and church leaders as being evil and deceptive, but claimed in interviews not to have advocated violence.

Chenault first decided to assassinate Rev. Jesse Jackson in Chicago, but cancelled the plan at the last minute. Two weeks later, he set out for Atlanta, where he shot Alberta King with two handguns as she sat at the organ of the Ebenezer Baptist Church. While Alberta was playing "The Lord's Prayer" on the church organ, Chenault stood up and yelled, "You are serving a false god," and fired his gun at her.

Chenault said that he shot King because "all Christians are my enemies," and claimed that he had decided that Black ministers were a menace to Black people. He said his original target had been Martin Luther King Sr., but he had decided to shoot King Sr.'s wife instead because she was near him. He also killed one of the church's deacons, Edward Boykin, in the attack and wounded retired schoolteacher Jimmie Mitchell in the neck.

King and Boykin were rushed to the nearby Grady Memorial Hospital. Officials announced King was "barely alive" when she arrived at the hospital. Boykin was pronounced dead on arrival. King died shortly afterward from a gunshot wound to the right side of her head.

Alberta King was interred at the South-View Cemetery in Atlanta. Martin Luther King Sr. died of a heart attack on November 11, 1984, and was interred next to her.

=== Conviction ===
Chenault was convicted of first-degree murder and sentenced to death. The sentence was upheld on appeal. He was later resentenced to life in prison, partially as a result of the King family's opposition to the death penalty. On August 3, 1995, he suffered a stroke, and was taken to a hospital. On August 19, 1995, he died at 44 from complications from the stroke.

== General references ==
- The Papers of Martin Luther King Jr. Volume I: Called to Serve, January 1929-June 1951 (University of California Press, 1992) Introduction
- The Autobiography of Martin Luther King, Jr. (New York: Warner Book, 1998) Chapter 1 edited by Clayborne Carson
- Martin Luther King, Jr., "Autobiography of Religious Development," 22 November 1950
- Daddy King and Me: Memories of the Forgotten Father of the Civil Rights Movement. Continental Shelf Publishing, 2009; Chapter Four, p. 69.
- Tubbs, Anna Malaika, The Three Mothers: How the Mothers of Martin Luther King, Jr., Malcom X, and James Baldwin Shaped a Nation, 2021
