= World Intermediary Liability Map =

Online repository

The World Intermediary Liability Map (WILMap) is an online repository of information on international intermediary liability regimes hosted at Stanford CIS. The WILMap has been designed, developed and launched in July 2014 by Giancarlo Frosio.

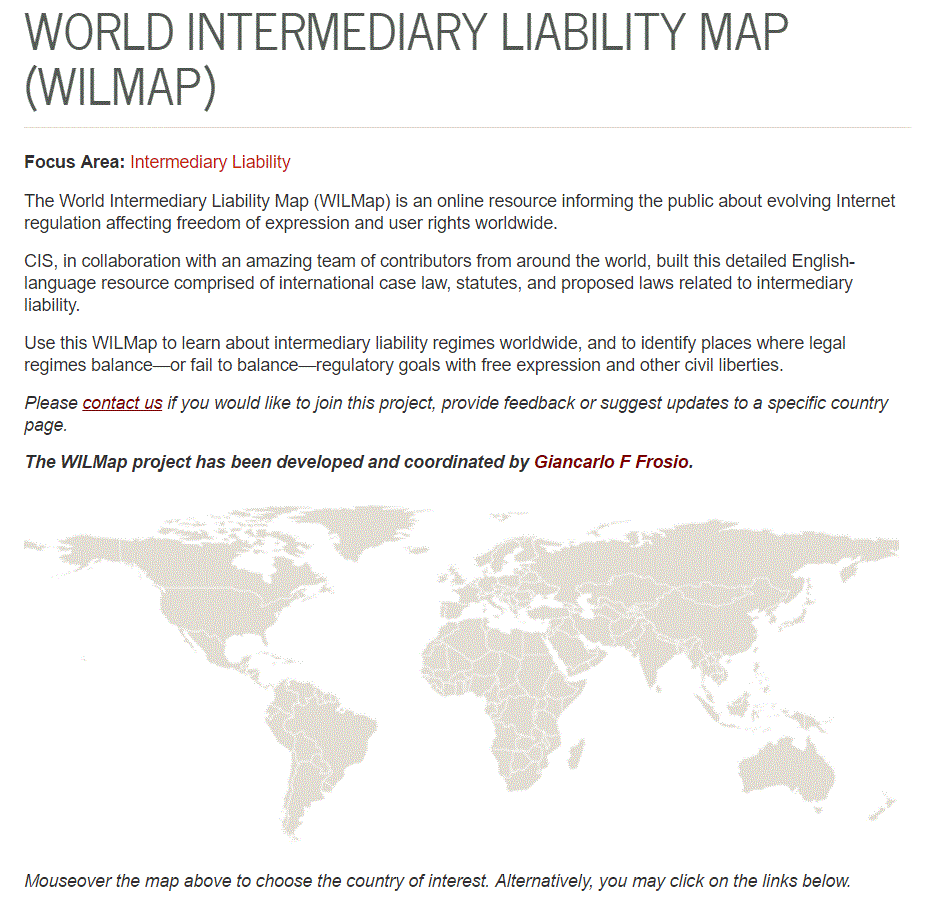

The WILMap is a graphic interface for legislation and case law enabling the public to learn about intermediary liability regimes worldwide and evolving Internet regulation affecting freedom of expression and user rights. This detailed English-language resource allows visitors to select information on countries of interest, including case law, statutes, and proposed laws. Each country page includes links to original sources and English translations, if available. As the WILMap website, programmatically states, this resource should be used “to learn about intermediary liability regimes worldwide, and to identify places where legal regimes balance—or fail to balance—regulatory goals with free expression and other civil liberties.”

== Scope ==
The WILMap features legislation, pending bills and proposals imposing obligations on intermediaries, both access and hosting providers or other online intermediaries, such as payment processors. The WILMap covers wide-ranging topics, including online intermediaries' safe harbors, e-commerce, copyright and trademark protection, defamation, hate/dangerous speech, including anti-terrorism provisions, privacy protection, and child protection online. If available, the WILMap includes relevant case law for each jurisdiction. Basically, the WILMap would like to features any case law discussing obligations and liability of online intermediaries due to (infringing) activities undertaken by their users. The WILMap also features sections for administrative enforcement of intermediary liability online, if there are administrative agencies in charge with implementing website blocking orders or content removal in a certain jurisdiction.

== Coverage and expansion ==
Since its launch in July 2014, the WILMap has been steadily and rapidly growing. In May 2018, an improved version of the WILMap was launched, including a new layout, a relational database and additional features. Today, the WILMap covers almost one hundred jurisdictions in Africa, Asia, the Caribbean, Europe, Latin America, North America and Oceania. The WILMap is an ongoing project. In collaboration with a network of experts worldwide, CIS continues to update and expand the map, with the goal of covering all jurisdictions. In an effort to make the WILMap an increasingly valuable resource for activists, industry players, researchers, and the general public, the WILMap website will be soon updated with enhanced usability and data aggregation features.

== Contributors ==
The WILMap project was made possible by a team of contributors from around the world, both individual researchers and institutions, providing the necessary information to create and update each country page. The creation of a global network of WILMap contributors also allowed to promote synergies with global platforms and free expression groups to advocate for policies that will protect innovation and other user rights.
