= SEXINT =

Blackmail practice

SEXINT is the practice of monitoring and/or characterizing/indexing the pornographic preferences of internet users in an effort to later use the information for blackmail. The term is a portmanteau of sexual intelligence retrieved on an intelligence service target and was first used by Jennifer Granick, Director of Civil Liberties at the Stanford Center for Internet and Society.

== Uses ==
The term was first used specifically in reference to the practice by Five Eyes member, the National Security Agency of the United States of America. It is unclear how often these programs and methods are used in comparison to other Five Eyes initiatives such as Optic Nerve (GCHQ), and XKEYSCORE.

A leaked NSA document from October 2012 identified six people, all Muslims, whom the document termed "radicalizers" and presented as potential targets of this method. The document does not accuse any of the six targets of involvement in terrorist plots, but rather states that "the NSA believes the targeted individuals radicalize people through the expression of controversial ideas via YouTube, Facebook and other social media websites".

== See also ==
- FBI–King suicide letter
