= FedEx furniture =

Art website

FedEx furniture is the artistic creation of computer programmer and creative consumer Jose Avila, III. In June 2005, Avila created a website, Fedexfurniture.com, to display photographs of a couch, bed, dining room table, and desk that he had constructed out of cartons obtained from overnight shipping giant FedEx Corporation (FedEx). FedEx attorneys used the takedown provisions of the Digital Millennium Copyright Act (DMCA) to force Avila's ISP to take the site offline, accusing Avila of infringing on FedEx's copyrights and trademarks, breaching his contract with FedEx by using the cartons for purposes other than shipping, and potentially misleading consumers into believing that FedEx approved or endorsed Avila's actions. Among attorneys and activist organizations concerned with the exercise of First Amendment rights on the Internet, FedEx's actions raised questions about the constitutionality of using the DMCA to censor unwanted speech. The Fedexfurniture.com website is down as of July 8, 2017.

== The story ==
In 2005, Avila moved to Tempe, Arizona with nothing more than clothes and work essentials. He was still stuck in a lease on his California apartment, and could barely afford his new apartment in Arizona.

After a bit of frustration over not having furniture, Avila remembered that a former roommate had solved a similar problem by constructing furniture using FedEx cartons. Using hundreds of FedEx boxes and materials that he "already had lying around" for shipping various items, Avila constructed every piece of furniture in his apartment. Avila's designs were sturdy and attractive. Friends urged Avila to put pictures of the furniture on a Web site. According to Avila, he did so in order to show that trying financial circumstances need not lead to despair; one can respond creatively, even artistically, by using "found" materials. The site's message was "It's OK to be ghetto".

The site subsequently attracted widespread attention, both from Web surfers and the press. Because the site was getting so much traffic, Avila placed a PayPal donation link on the page and asked for help to pay for the bandwidth charges. He also announced a plan to sell Fedexfurniture.com T-shirts, although Avila says that no T-shirts were ever sold.

On June 27, 2005, FedEx attorneys wrote to Avila's ISP. Citing the takedown provisions of the Digital Millennium Copyright Act (DMCA), they demanded that the ISP remove Avila's materials from the Web. They justified their request on two grounds:

- Infringement of FedEx's intellectual property (specifically, copyrights and trademarks.)
- Violation of FedEx's terms of use for packaging supplies.

In order to take advantage of the safe harbor provisions of the DMCA, Avila's ISP complied with the request and removed Avila's materials from the Web. Had the ISP not done so, it could have been held liable for contributory infringement (aiding and abetting the infringer) if Avila's materials were subsequently found to be infringing in a court of law.

FedEx's actions concerned Internet free speech activist organizations, such as Stanford University's Center for Internet and Society, which are concerned about the use of the DMCA's takedown provisions to censor unwanted speech. According to these organizations, the DMCA's purpose is to prevent Internet copyright infringement; it was never Congress's intent that the DMCA's takedown provisions should be used when the real issue is trademark infringement or breach of contract.

A Stanford attorney, Jennifer Granick, assisted Avila on a pro bono basis. In her letter to FedEx, she disputed the use of the DMCA to remove Avila's site from the Web; she argued that the company's claim of copyright infringement had no merit; therefore, FedEx should not have used the DMCA to silence Avila's speech. The company's underlying motivations, she argued, were to protect its trademark and ability to place restrictions on public use of its cartons. Avila restored his site briefly. The dispute attracted widespread press attention, and Avila was frequently interviewed to tell his side of the story. In response to Granick's letter, FedEx attorneys reiterated their claims. Subsequently, Avila removed his site from the Web, citing technical difficulties. By January 2006, Avila's site had returned, however, by June 30, 2006, the site had again disappeared. This was caused by a server crash, and as of July 27, 2006 it was back online, but as of August 16, 2007 the site is gone. It popped up again in October 2007, but is currently down (July 8, 2017).
