= Jennifer Granick =

American attorney and educator

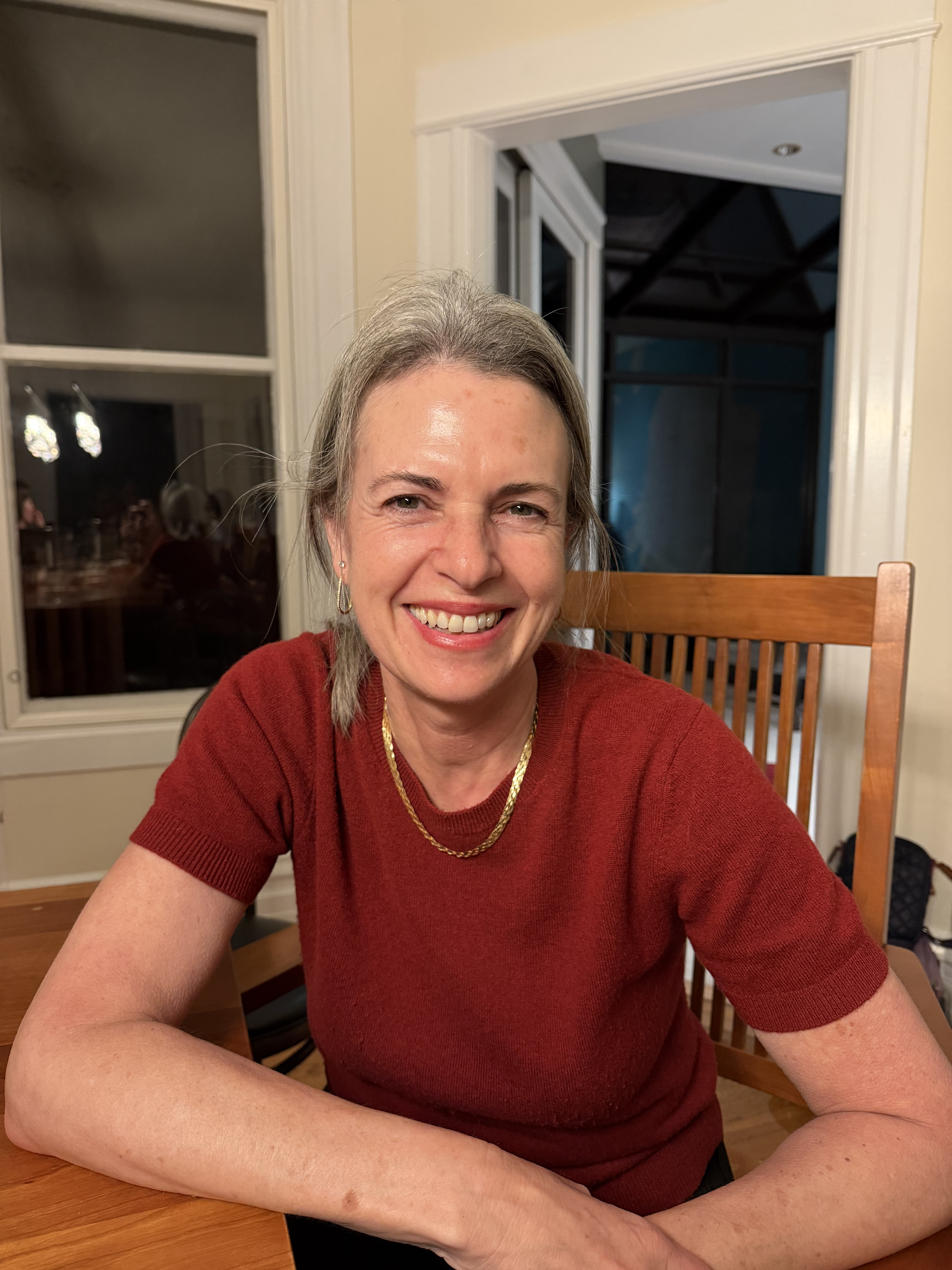
- Granick in 2026

Personal details
- Born: Jennifer Stisa Granick; 1969 (age 56–57) Glen Ridge, New Jersey
- Occupation: Attorney, educator

Jennifer Stisa Granick (born 1969) is an American attorney and educator. Senator Ron Wyden has called Granick an "NBA all-star of surveillance law." She is well known for her work with intellectual property law, free speech, privacy law, and other things relating to computer security, and has represented several high-profile hackers.

== Early life and education ==
Granick was born and raised in Glen Ridge, New Jersey. Both of her parents were local educators. She attended Glen Ridge High School and then New College in Sarasota, Florida, from which she received a Bachelor of Arts degree in 1990. After that, she moved to San Francisco to attend Hastings Law School, from which she graduated in 1993.

== Career ==
Granick began her career in criminal defense, first at the state public defender's office, then as a trial attorney at the law firm Campbell & DeMetrick. From 1996 to 2001 she worked in private practice specializing in defending cases involving computer crime. It was during this period that she defended notorious cybercriminal Max Butler, who was on trial for hacking into Defense Department computers.

in 2001, Granick became the executive director of the Center for Internet and Society at Stanford Law School, where she was a lecturer in law and taught classes on cyber law. She founded and directed the Law School's Cyberlaw Clinic where she supervised students in working on some of the most important cyberlaw cases that took place during her tenure. She was selected by Information Security magazine in 2003 as one of 20 "Women of Vision" in the computer security field.

Granick has been a speaker at conferences such as Def Con and ShmooCon, and has also spoken at the National Security Agency as well as to other law enforcement officials. She delivered the keynote "Lifecycle of a Revolution" at the 2015 Black Hat USA conference.

She was one of the primary crafters of a 2006 exception to the Digital Millennium Copyright Act which allows mobile telephone owners to legally circumvent the firmware locking their device to a single carrier.

Granick was the Civil Liberties Director at the Electronic Frontier Foundation from 2007 to 2010. She was then an attorney at Washington DC–based law firm Zwillinger Genetski from 2010 to 2012, and General Counsel of Worldstar, LLC for a brief period in early 2012.

In 2012, Granick returned to the Center for Internet and Society as its Civil Liberties Director, where she specialized in surveillance law.

Internet activist Aaron Swartz sought Granick's counsel after his arrest for downloading articles from JSTOR, for which he faced 35 years imprisonment. Granick both defended Swartz and challenged the scope of the law under which he was prosecuted. Swartz committed suicide in January 2013, two months before his trial.

In 2016, Granick was honored with the Duo Security's Women in Security Academic Award.

In 2017, Granick published her first book, American Spies: Modern Surveillance, Why You Should Care, and What to Do About It.

The American Civil Liberties Union announced that Granick would be joining the organization as Surveillance and Cybersecurity Counsel in September 2017.

== Writings ==
- American Spies: Modern Surveillance, Why You Should Care, and What to Do About It, Cambridge University Press, 2017
- Chapter One: Legal and Ethical Issues, "Security Power Tools", 2006
- "Faking It: Calculating Loss in Computer Crime Cases", A Journal of Law and Policy for the Information Society, Cybersecurity, Volume 2, Issue 2 (2006)
- "The Price of Restricting Vulnerability Publications", SSRN
- Circuit Court, a bi-weekly column for Wired News
- "PAS or Fail: The Use and Abuse of the Preliminary Alcohol Screening Test", The Champion, National Association of Criminal Defense Lawyers, April 1996
- Granick, Jennifer (October 1, 1997). "Scotty, Beam Down the Lawyers!". Wired.

== Selected cases and clients ==
- Represented Christopher Soghoian, creator of a fake boarding pass generator, in 2006
- Represented Michael Lynn in 2005 as part of the Cisco/ISS incident at the Black Hat technology conference
- Represented Kevin Poulsen
- Represented Jerome Heckenkamp
- Represented Luke Smith and Nelson Pavlosky in Online Policy Group v. Diebold Election Systems (now Premier Election Solutions), a copyright misuse case related to electronic voting
- Represented calculator hobbyists against threats from Texas Instruments
- Wrote amicus briefs regarding application of the Computer Fraud and Abuse Act in American Airlines v. Farechase, United States v. Lowson, United States v. Lori Drew
- Represented HBGary

== See also ==
- FedEx furniture
- SEXINT
- How the US Government spies on people who protest - including you on TEDX (à Stanford, en Avril 2017)
