= Martin Luther King Jr., A Current Analysis =

1968 document by the FBI

Martin Luther King Jr., A Current Analysis by the Federal Bureau of Investigation (PDF version)

Martin Luther King Jr., A Current Analysis, officially released as File 104-10125-10133, is a previously classified 20-page analysis by the Federal Bureau of Investigation (FBI) on Martin Luther King Jr., created on March 12, 1968, only three weeks before King's assassination, which sparked several conspiracy theories. When the FBI created the document, it was classified as secret and on May 8, 1994, the document was reviewed by the FBI/JFK Task Force, where it was marked for "total denial". The document was declassified and released on November 3, 2017, by order of President of the United States Donald Trump.

== Content and analysis ==
The analysis by the FBI stated King's political ideologies, the civil rights movement, and the Southern Christian Leadership Conference (SCLC) was heavily influenced by the Communist Party of the United States of America. Historian David Garrow stated the document's allegations were untrue. The document also stated King was "a whole-hearted Marxist who has studied it (Marxism), believes in it and agrees with it, but because of his being a minister of religion, does not dare to espouse it publicly". The document also named Stanley Levison, one of King's top advisors as one of the FBI's sources for the information presented. The analysis also included investigation, which discovered King's "drinking, fornication, and homosexuality that went on at the conference", "prostitution", and "an all-night sex orgy was held with these prostitutes". Newsweek stated this investigation, by order of FBI director J. Edgar Hoover, was "to uncover compromising information on King and use it to publicly discredit him". An analysis by CNN stated the file "makes clear the FBI’s focus on digging up dirt about a man who had become an icon".

== See also ==
- FBI–King letter
