= Lyndon Fitzgerald Pace =

American serial killer and burglar

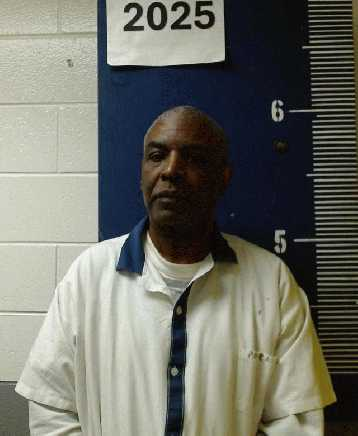
- 2025 mugshot
- Born: July 12, 1964 (age 62); Atlanta, Georgia, U.S.
- Convictions: Murder (4 counts); Rape (4 counts); Burglary (10 counts); Attempted rape
- Penalty: Death

Details
- Victims: 4–5
- Span of crimes: 1988–1989
- Country: United States
- State: Georgia
- Date apprehended: October 2, 1992
- Imprisoned at: Georgia Diagnostic and Classification State Prison

Lyndon Fitzgerald Pace (born July 12, 1964) is an American serial killer and burglar. Between 1988 and 1989, he robbed and killed elderly women primarily in Atlanta's Vine City neighborhood. Among his burglary victims was Coretta Scott King, Martin Luther King Jr.'s widow. Pace was convicted of four murders, but was not tried for a fifth, and was sentenced to death for his crimes.

== Murders ==
The first victim was 86-year-old Lula Bell McAfee, an elderly lady living at 321 Simon St. S.E in southeast Atlanta. A boarder found her nude body in the kneeling position on the bed, sexually assaulted and strangled with a combination of her bra and a rag. Police theorized that she had been killed between the early evening of August 27, 1988, and the early morning of the following day.

Not long after, 78-year-old Mattie Mae McClendon on September 10, 1988, who lived near the Atlanta University Center and was found dead in her apartment by her sister. She was facing the pillow. Although McClendon showed no signs of foul play, detectives still decided to investigate it as a homicide, as a window in her home had been broken. Her death was investigated alongside that of Lillian Lawrence, another older woman who died under mysterious circumstances, but the deaths were later determined to be unrelated. The official cause was later determined to be asphyxiation by suffocation.

There was a brief period of inactivity in the killings, but they resumed on February 4, 1989. On that day, 79-year-old retired practical nurse Johnnie Mae "John-John" Martin, a respected member of her neighborhood, was strangled in her bed with a shoelace, with the killer later searching through her house. It appeared that he had entered by forcing open a window at the back of her house. Authorities were called by her younger sister, Ruth Lindsey, as she had not returned her phone calls.

Roughly a month later, on March 4, 42-year-old Ann "Annie" Kate Britt was found naked and strangled with a sock by her sister. Like with the previous cases, she was living alone, and her home had been broken into and subsequently ransacked. With this death, all four recorded deaths so far were treated as part of one murder series. All available physical evidence was sent for examination by the GBI. Among the similarities shared between the victims were age, race, and sex. At the same time, at the crime scenes, the homes were broken into, with robbery as the motive. Each victim was sexually assaulted and then strangled with an object.

Another speculative victim is 77-year-old Mary "Miz Mary" Hudson, who was strangled and beaten on September 18, 1992, in her duplex apartment near the Georgia Dome. Although she lived near the other women, Hudson was found fully clothed and was not sexually assaulted. She was afraid of the local drug trade, and her death may have been related to that trade. Pace was never charged with this murder, and his involvement in it, if any, remains up for debate.

== Arrest, trial and imprisonment ==
On October 3, 1992, Lyndon Fitzgerald Pace was arrested for multiple burglaries in the Vine City neighborhood. He had previous convictions for drug possession and burglaries; his most notable burglary being the December 28, 1990, burglary of Coretta Scott King's home, from which he stole a radio. He pled guilty to these charges on February 15, 1991, and served several months in prison, where he was described as a model inmate. He was released on July 11, 1991, due to problems with prison overcrowding. Authorities started focusing on him after the September 30, 1992, robbery of 83-year-old Susie Sublett in Vine City, in which the intruder, later identified as Pace, threatened to shoot her with a .22 caliber pistol he found under a pillow.

On November 25, 1992, Atlanta Police Chief Eldrin A. Bell announced that Lyndon Pace was now the prime suspect in the Vine City killings. Officials later that week announced that DNA evidence from semen samples also matched the accused man. On February 20, 1996, Pace was put on trial for four of the rape-murders. The prosecutor, Attorney Herman Sloan, said that blood and hair samples from the accused matched the murder scenes, while the defense lawyer, Nancy Mau, argued that the scientific evidence meant nothing and that they were simply prosecuting a "convenient man."

On March 5, 1996, Lyndon Pace was convicted of the murders and other crimes, including the attempted rape of a 12-year-old girl in 1987 and the 1990 break-in of King's home. Despite pleas from the perpetrator's family and the objections of the defense attorney, Lyndon Fitzgerald Pace was sentenced to death, not showing any emotion during the sentencing. As of January 2025, he remains on Georgia's death row.

In January 2005, following multiple other burglaries, Coretta Scott King moved away from the family home in Vine City to a new condominium in Buckhead. In the article, the encounter with Pace was noted.

== See also ==
- List of death row inmates in the United States
- List of serial killers in the United States

== Bibliography ==
- Robert Keller (2016). Blood Brothers Volume 1: 25 Terrifying African American Serial Killers. CreateSpace Independent Publishing Platform. ISBN 978-1535211239.
- Robert Keller (2017). Serial Killer Case Files Volume 2. Draft2Digital.
