= Creative consumer =

A creative consumer is defined as any "individual or group who adapt, modify, or transform a proprietary offering". Traditional consumers simply use and consume products and services, creative consumers do the same but also change them in some way.

Examples include:

- The hacker George Hotz unlocked the original iPhone and hacked Sony's PlayStation 3, then gave away these hacks for free.
- Jose Avila made FedEx furniture for his apartment exclusively from Federal Express boxes.
- Jim Hill, a devoted Disney fan, designed and delivered guided but unauthorized tours of Disneyland.

In 2005, The Economist published an article about the future of innovation, ‘The rise of the creative consumer’. This article explained that some companies rely on identifying and leveraging the innovation potential of creative consumers. However, many companies may feel threatened or upset by the actions of creative consumers. Hotz, Avila, and Hill all received negative, and in some cases threatening, reactions from the companies whose products and services they had repurposed.

Berthon, et al., proposed that companies can take four general stances on creative consumers. These stances are determined by whether the company's actions toward these creative consumers are active or passive and whether the company's attitude towards creative consumers is either positive or negative.

The four stances are:

- Resist stance (active/negative): restrain consumer creativity
- Discourage stance (passive/negative): tolerate or ignore consumer creativity
- Encourage stance (passive/positive): don't actively facilitate consumer creativity
- Enable stance (active/positive): actively facilitate consumer creativity

== See also ==
- Prosumer – Person who consumes and produces a product

== Bibliography ==
- Page, Kelly L.; Pitt, Leyland (1 November 2011). "Web 2.0, Social Media, and Creative Consumers: Special Issue". Journal of Consumer Behaviour. 10 (6): i–iii. doi:10.1002/cb.390. ISSN 1479-1838.
