= FBI–King letter =

Letter sent by FBI to Martin Luther King Jr.

A copy of a page of the "suicide letter" sent to Martin Luther King Jr., as published in The New York Times in 2014 (Note: The New York Times obscured the name of a person stated in the letter as involved with King because they could not verify the claim. Other portions of the letter which were previously not made public were uncovered in 2014.)

The FBI–King suicide letter or blackmail package was an anonymous 1964 letter and package by the Federal Bureau of Investigation (FBI) which was allegedly meant to blackmail American civil rights activist and Baptist minister Martin Luther King Jr. into committing suicide.

== History ==
On November 21, 1964, a package that contained the letter and a tape recording allegedly of King's sexual indiscretions was delivered to King's address. Although the letter was anonymously written, King correctly suspected the FBI sent the package. King's wife Coretta Scott said the tapes comprised only "mumbo jumbo". The letter does not specify exactly what action it is urging King to undertake; King understood the letter to advocate that he commit suicide, although some have suggested that it was urging him to decline the Nobel Peace Prize which he was awarded in 1964, or step out of leadership.

On March 8, 1971, an activist group called the Citizens' Commission to Investigate the FBI burglarized a local office of the FBI in Media, Pennsylvania, and stole classified documents. Parts of them exposed a secret FBI operation called COINTELPRO. Those documents were later sent to newspapers and members of the United States Congress. During the Church Committee hearings and investigations in 1975, a copy of the "suicide letter" was discovered in the work files of William C. Sullivan, deputy FBI director. He has been suggested as its author. Once the existence of surveillance tapes of King was publicly revealed, Bernard Lee and the Southern Christian Leadership Conference (SCLC) filed a lawsuit to have tapes from wiretaps destroyed. Their request was denied by United States District Court for the District of Columbia judge John Lewis Smith Jr. He ordered all tapes sealed for 50 years and placed into the National Archives and Records Administration.

Since 1977, attempts have been made to release the recordings in the United States Congress. Republican Senator Jesse Helms from North Carolina in 1983 sought to reveal information about King in order to undermine the establishment of Martin Luther King Jr. Day. The Martin Luther King Jr. Records Collection bill, which would designate King government files for "presumption of immediate disclosure", was introduced in Congress by Democratic Representative Cynthia McKinney from Georgia in 2002 and 2005, by Democratic senator John Kerry from Massachusetts in 2006, and by Democratic representative John Lewis from Georgia in 2010, but never passed by Congress.

The full letter was discovered in J. Edgar Hoover's confidential files at the National Archives in 2014 by historian Beverly Gage. It was soon published in The New York Times, with only one name being redacted because "The Times could not verify or disprove the claims about her." Gage noted that some still claim the letter's intent was "simply meant to push King out, not induce suicide", and argued that an uncovered portion of the letter suggested that FBI wanted King to step down and let other men lead the civil rights movement, stating that "Another uncovered portion of the note praises 'older leaders' like the NAACP executive director Roy Wilkins, urging King to step aside and let other men lead the civil rights movement."

== Text ==
The text of the letter is as follows:

KING,

In view of your low grade, abnormal personal behavoir [sic] I will not dignify your name with either a Mr. or a Reverend or a Dr. And, your last name calls to mind only the type of King such as King Henry VIII and his countless acts of adultery and immoral conduct lower than that of a beast.

King, look into your heart. You know you are a complete fraud and a great liability to all of us Negroes. White people in this country have enough frauds of their own but I am sure they don’t have one at this time that is any where near your equal. You are no clergyman and you know it. I repeat you are a colossal fraud and an evil, vicious one at that. You could not believe in God and act as you do. Clearly you don’t believe in any personal moral principles.

King, like all frauds your end is approaching. You could have been our greatest leader. You, even at an early age have turned out to be not a leader but a dissolute, abnormal moral imbecile. We will now have to depend on our older leaders like [Roy] Wilkins a man of character and thank God we have others like him. But you are done. Your "honorary" degrees, your Nobel Prize (what a grim farce) and other awards will not save you. King, I repeat you are done.

No person can overcome facts, not even a fraud like yourself. Lend your sexually psychotic ear to the enclosure. You will find yourself and in all your dirt, filth, evil and moronic talk exposed on the record for all time. I repeat – no person can argue successfully against facts. You are finished. You will find on the record for all time your filthy, dirty, evil companions, male and females giving expression with you to your hidious [sic] abnormalities. And some of them to pretend to be ministers of the Gospel. Satan could not do more. What incredible evilness. It is all there on the record, your sexual orgies. Listen to yourself you filthy, abnormal animal. You are on the record. You have been on the record – all your adulterous acts, your sexual orgies extending far into the past. This one is but a tiny sample. You will understand this. Yes, from your various evil playmates on the east coast to [redacted] and others on the west coast and outside the country you are on the record. King you are done.

The American public, the church organizations that have been helping – Protestant, Catholic and Jews will know you for what you are – an evil, abnormal beast. So will others who have backed you. You are done.

King, there is only one thing left for you to do. You know what it is. You have just 34 days in which to do (this exact number has been selected for a specific reason, it has definite practical significant [sic]. You are done. There is but one way out for you. You better take it before your filthy, abnormal fraudulent self is bared to the nation.

== See also ==
- SEXINT
- MLK/FBI
- Martin Luther King Jr., A Current Analysis
