= Kurt Donsbach =

American chiropractor

- Born: December 1, 1935; Whitefish, Montana
- Died: August 29, 2021 (aged 85)
- Occupation: Chiropractor

Kurt Walter Donsbach (December 1, 1935 – August 29, 2021) was a controversial alternative medicine figure who was twice convicted of practicing medicine without a license. At other times he also faced charges of misbranding drugs for sale, unlawfully dispensing drugs as a cure for cancer, tax evasion, practicing medicine without a license, and falsely representing a cure for cancer.

== Background ==
Donsbach graduated from Western States Chiropractic College in 1957. He stated that he had a naturopathic degree from Hollywood College of Naturopathic Medicine, however after investigation the degree was found to be fraudulent. After working for Royal Lee, a controversial supplements manufacturer, Donsbach founded his own store in the late 1960s. In 1971, Donsbach was prosecuted for misrepresenting a series of herbal medicines and supplements by falsely claiming that they could cure a number of diseases, including cancer and heart disease. He was fined and placed on probation. In 1973, he was convicted a second time on similar charges, and again was fined and placed on probation - which he subsequently violated the following year, resulting in another fine.

After selling his business, Donsbach joined the unaccredited Union University of Los Angeles as their new Dean of the Department of Nutrition, before founding his own unaccredited Donsbach University, which gained a reputation as a producer of false diplomas in the health and nutrition field, at one point issuing more PhDs in nutrition than all accredited programs combined. Along with Donsbach University, Donsbach also created the International Academy of Nutritional Consultants, which in 1983 gained brief notoriety from the Washington Post when caught issuing nutrition counseling credentials to a tabby cat whose assistants had submitted incomplete paperwork.

Donsbach was the founder of Hospital Santa Monica in Rosarito, Baja California, Mexico. Following the death of Coretta Scott King while under treatment at the clinic in January 2006, the facility was shut down by Mexican health officials. Donsbach's activities have repeatedly been criticized by Stephen Barrett of Quackwatch.

== Felony charges ==
Donsbach was charged and found guilty of tax evasion and the smuggling of illegal medications in 1996.

On April 9, 2009, Donsbach was arrested during his Internet radio health show and charged with 11 felony counts, including dispensing unapproved drugs. Prosecutors also charged Donsbach with offering neuropeptides to his patients. These drugs contained nimesulide, which have been banned in Europe because they cause high rates of liver failure and have resulted in some deaths. In January 2010, a San Diego judge ruled there was enough evidence for the case against Donsbach to proceed to trial. Donsbach faced up to 12 years and eight months if convicted. The case ended with a plea deal with Donsbach facing up to a year in jail, followed by probation.

On December 13, 2010, Donsbach pleaded guilty to 13 additional felony charges, including practicing medicine without a license and selling misbranded drugs.

== Selected publications ==
- Passport to Good Health: Your Nutritional Guide to Good Living (1972)
- Wholistic Cancer Therapy (1993)
- What You Need to Know About Heart Disease, Stroke, Oral And Intravenous Chelation (1999)
- What Your Doctor Won't Tell You About Heart Attacks, Strokes, Hypertension (2006)
