= Bernard Lee (activist) =

American civil rights activist (1935–1991)

- Born: October 2, 1935
- Died: February 10, 1991 (aged 55)

Bernard Lee (October 2, 1935 – February 10, 1991) was an activist and member of the Southern Christian Leadership Conference during the Civil Rights Movement. He was a key associate of Martin Luther King Jr.

== Civil Rights Movement ==
Lee began his civil rights career as a student at Alabama State College, from which he was expelled after leading more than half the student body in a march on the Alabama capitol. During demonstrations for equal library access in 1960, he said: "My grandfather had only a prayer to help him. I have a prayer and an education."

Bernard Lee was a courageous student activist, a founding member of the Student Nonviolent Coordinating Committee (SNCC). While attending Alabama State University (ASU), he led a sit-in at the Alabama state capitol cafeteria. He was expelled from ASU for the event after the governor threatened the university president, saying he would withhold funding from the HBCU if Lee was not expelled. So, he transferred to Morris Brown College in Atlanta, Georgia to work with the Southern Christian Leadership Conference (SCLC) and Martin Luther King Jr, where he contributed to the Poor People's Campaign and was at King's side after his assassination. Lee later worked for the U.S. Government under President Carter and for Washington D.C. under Mayor Barry (Source NAACP 2014) (http://www.blackpast.org/aah/morris-brown-college-1885)

Lee was King's personal assistant and traveling companion for many years. He was arrested with King in 1960 and left the Student Nonviolent Coordinating Committee (SNCC) in 1961 so that he could work full-time with King and the SCLC. He participated in the 1961 Freedom Rides and helped to orchestrate the Birmingham Campaign in 1963. He went to Chicago with King in 1965. In January 1967, he was one of few in to accompany King to Jamaica while he wrote Where Do We Go From Here?

Lee was closer to King than any other member of the Civil Rights Movement, so much that by some accounts he began to identify with King completely. According to historian Taylor Branch: "Lee had already come to dress like King, walk like King, and even to imitate King's long, measured phrases."

Lee worked on the Poor People's Campaign after King's death in 1968. He also became vice president of the SCLC, which diminished in power over the following years.

Lee was directly privy to FBI targeting of King under COINTELPRO, having been present when King received a letter from the FBI urging him to commit suicide. Lee sued the Federal Bureau of Investigation (FBI) in 1977 in an effort to force the destruction of surveillance recordings of King collected during a January 5, 1963, stay at the Willard Hotel in Washington D.C. Judge John Lewis denied Lee's request and ordered the records to be preserved by the National Archives and sealed until 2027.

== Later life ==
Lee worked during the Carter administration as a civil rights advisor to the Environmental Protection Agency. During this time he joined with other Black members of the administration to express concern over its policies toward Africa and African Americans.

In 1985, Lee received a master's degree in Divinity from Howard University, and became the chaplain at Lorton Prison in Virginia.

In 1989, he was involved in a public dispute with Ralph Abernathy over Abernathy's book And the Walls Came Tumbling Down. Lee criticized Abernathy's book, which supported rumors about King's extramarital sex life.

Lee died of heart failure in 1991.

== See also ==
- Andrew Young
- Timeline of the civil rights movement
