= Martin Luther King Jr. Records Collection Act =

Proposed U.S. government legislation

The Martin Luther King Jr. Records Collection Act, or MLK Records Act, is a proposed legislation that would release United States government records pertaining to the life and death of Martin Luther King Jr. Versions of the law have been proposed on multiple occasions, and a complete version was brought to both chambers of the United States Congress in 2005–2006.

== History of the King files ==
The "FBI–King suicide letter", that the FBI mailed anonymously to Martin Luther King Jr. in an attempt to convince him to commit suicide, later released by the FBI.

In the years after the 1968 assassination of Martin Luther King Jr., reports emerged that the government was destroying sensitive documents related to the murder case. The FBI was criticized for appearing unusually reluctant to release records pertaining to King. In 1977, Judge John Lewis Smith ruled against Bernard Lee and the Southern Christian Leadership Conference (SCLC) in a lawsuit, and ordered that the King files be sealed for 50 years. In 1983, Senator Jesse Helms attempted to open the files because he believed that release of Federal Bureau of Investigation (FBI) records would incriminate King and prevent the establishment of Martin Luther King Jr. Day as a federal holiday. He was denied by Judge Smith.

The documents are thus not slated for release until 2027. Among these are an FBI file called "MURKIN" (for Murder-King, the official designation of the Martin Luther King assassination investigation) and information about how the FBI, through COINTELPRO, targeted King while he was alive.

On January 23, 2025 President Donald Trump signed an Executive Order declassifying some of the records concerning the assassination. These digitized records were released by the National Archives on July 21, 2025, while some are to remained sealed for two more years.

== Legislative history ==
=== Purpose of bill ===
Describing her reasons for drafting the bill, Rep. Cynthia McKinney (D-Georgia) stated: "The truth of the MLK assassination has never been totally revealed. The FBI program COINTELPRO, the CIA project Operation CHAOS, and the Army Intelligence operation Lantern Spike all worked together to prevent the rise of a 'black messiah' and replace Martin Luther King Jr. with a 'clean Negro.'" Senator John Kerry (D-Massachusetts), in a letter to David Ferriero, Archivist of the United States, wrote: "I now believe with the clock ticking, the urgent legislative need is to provide you, as quickly as possible, with the resources you need to finish the job you have been doing before any papers are destroyed or lost forever". Some conspiracy theorists suggest that already released documents from the MURKIN file connect the 1968 King assassination to the John F. Kennedy assassination in 1963.

=== Introduction of bill ===
The bill was introduced in the House of Representatives by McKinney on November 19, 2002; it was sent the same day to the House Committee on Government Reform where it died in committee. McKinney reintroduced the bill on May 23, 2005; it was again sent the same day to the House Committee on Government Reform where it again died in committee. Kerry introduced the bill in the Senate on April 4, 2006, with Sen. Hillary Clinton (D-New York) as a co-signer; it was read twice and referred the same day to the Committee on Homeland Security and Governmental Affairs where it died in committee. It was proposed again by Kerry and Rep. John Lewis (D-Georgia) in 2010.

Supporters of the bill have called for the release of records on other potentially racial violence. McKinney also proposed a Tupac Amaru Shakur Records Collection Act in 2005.

=== Elements of bill ===
The text of the Act states that "all Government records concerning the life and assassination of Reverend Dr. Martin Luther King Jr. should carry a presumption of immediate disclosure". It calls for the creation of a "Reverend Dr. Martin Luther King Jr. Records Collection" at the National Archive, and would charge the Archivist of the United States to maintain all disclosed records. The law would also create a Review Board to oversee the proper disclosure of records.

== See also ==
- President John F. Kennedy Assassination Records Collection Act of 1992
