= Barbara van Schewick =

German computer scientist and legal scholar

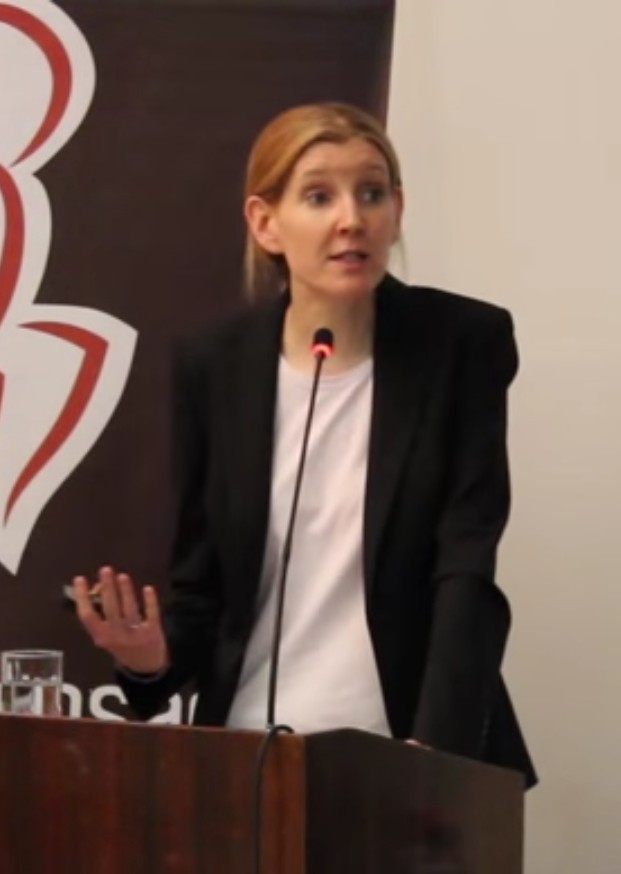
Barbara van Schewick in 2015

Barbara van Schewick (born 1972) is a computer scientist and law professor at Stanford Law School. She is widely recognized as a leading expert on net neutrality and the economic and social implications of internet regulation.

== Life ==
Van Schewick was born in Bonn, North Rhine-Westphalia. She studied computer science at Technische Universität Berlin and law at the Free University of Berlin. After her first state law examination, she initially worked as a lawyer in Berlin, working, among other things, at a management consultancy and as a speechwriter for the then-Governing Mayor Eberhard Diepgen. After her second state law examination, she was the first residential fellow at Lawrence Lessig's newly founded Center for Internet and Society (CIS) at Stanford University for 15 months. Since October 2004, van Schewick has been a research associate at the Department of Telecommunications Networks at Technische Universität Berlin.

In van Schewick's dissertation for the degree of Dr.-Ing., she dealt with Internet architecture, with both the design principles underlying it (particularly the end-to-end principle), and the technical, economic and social progress that this makes possible. Van Schewick's scholarly interests focus particularly on issues of net neutrality. She emphasizes the economic disadvantages to be feared if net neutrality were abandoned and network operators were each able to set their own rules for Internet use. In this respect, she has also been repeatedly consulted as an expert by the Federal Communications Commission. She is of the opinion that the Internet as it was originally designed and has functioned to date, as well as the opportunities for innovation associated with it, are now "in danger." Van Schewick's work was supervised by Bernd Lutterbeck (TU Berlin) and Lawrence Lessig.

In 2007, van Schewick received an appointment at Stanford Law School. She has since also served as associate professor of Electrical Engineering (by courtesy). Since Lessig's move to Harvard Law School, van Schewick has directed the Center for Internet and Society at Stanford.

Van Schewick has received several awards for her work. She was a study and doctoral scholar of the Studienstiftung and a foreign scholar of the Daimler and Benz Foundation. In 2010, she received the Forschungspreis Technische Kommunikation of the Alcatel-Lucent Foundation for Communication Research. For her dissertation Internet Architecture and Innovation, she was awarded the Science Prize of the German Foundation for Law and Informatics (DSRI) in 2005 and the Dieter Meurer Promotion Prize for Legal Informatics of the Deutscher EDV-Gerichstag in 2006.

Van Schewick is married and has two sons. She is the daughter of the former Federal Administrative Court judge Hans-Jürgen van Schewick.

== Publications ==
- van Schewick, Barbara (2010). Architecture & innovation: The role of the end-to-end arguments in the original internet. The MIT Press. ISBN 978-0-262-01397-0.
