= Stanford Center for Internet and Society =

The Center for Internet and Society (CIS) is a public interest technology law and policy program founded in 2000 by Lawrence Lessig at Stanford Law School and a part of Law, Science and Technology Program at Stanford Law School. CIS brings together scholars, academics, legislators, students, programmers, security researchers, and scientists to study the interaction of new technologies and the law and to examine how the synergy between the two can either promote or harm public goods like free speech, innovation, privacy, public commons, diversity, and scientific inquiry. CIS strives to improve both technology and law, encouraging decision makers to design both as a means to further democratic values.

CIS provides law students and the general public with educational resources and analyses of policy issues arising at the intersection of law, technology and the public interest. Through the Fair Use Project, CIS also provides legal representation to clients in matters that raise important issues of free expression, civil rights and technology. CIS sponsors a range of public events including a speakers series, conferences and workshops.

== People ==
- Barbara van Schewick – CIS faculty director; associate professor of law and (by courtesy) electrical engineering
- Elaine Adolfo - CIS associate director

== See also ==
- Berkman Center for Internet & Society
