= Sea Gate, Brooklyn =

Neighborhood of Brooklyn in New York City

Coordinates: 40°34′37.90″N 74°0′28.89″W

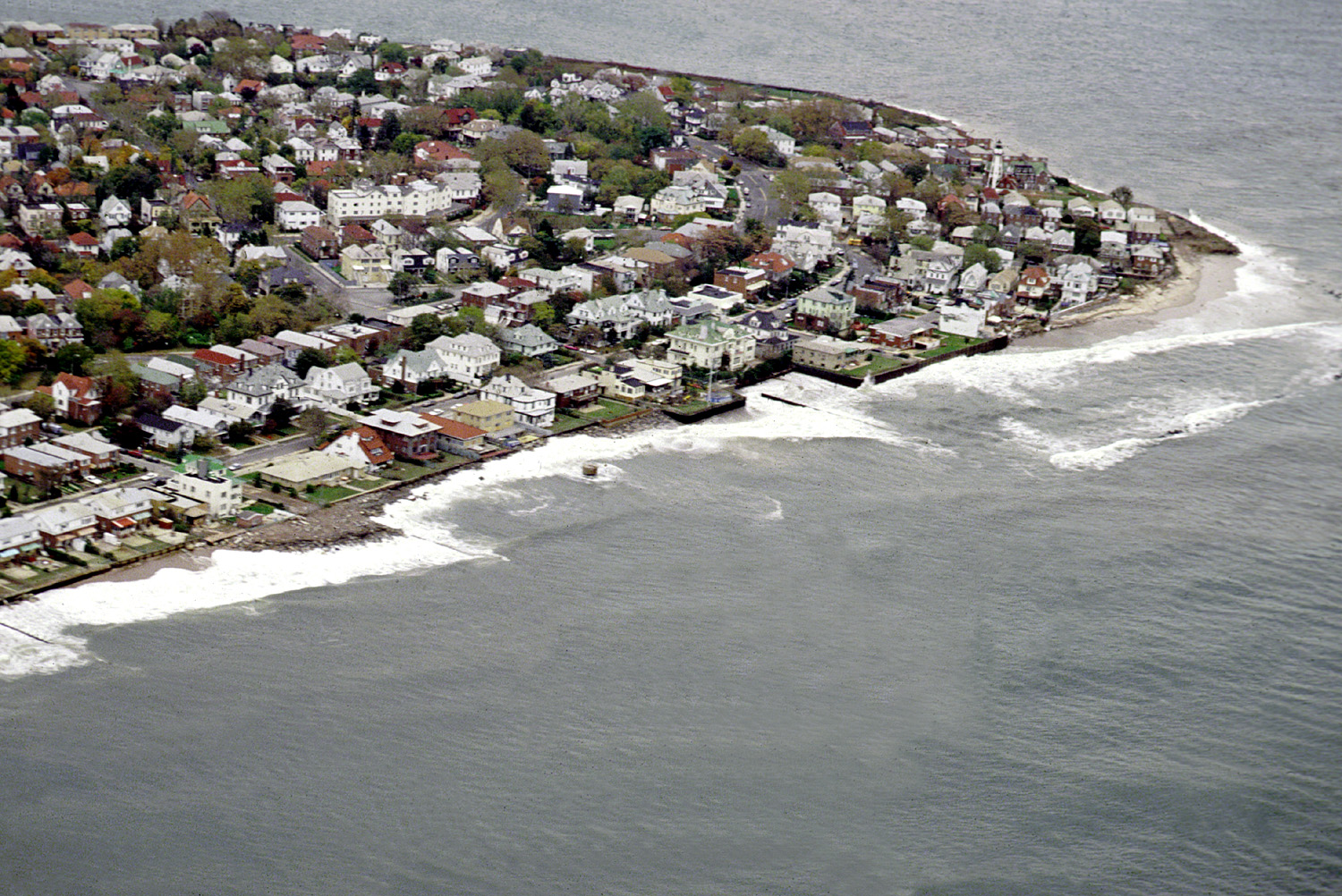
Aerial view of Sea Gate

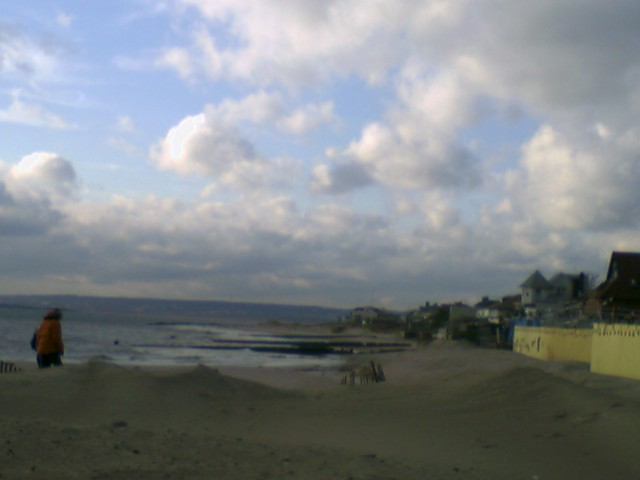
Beach strip

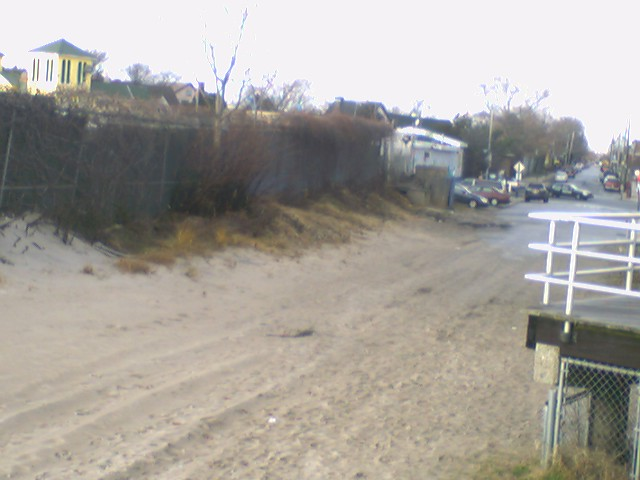
Eastern border of Sea Gate

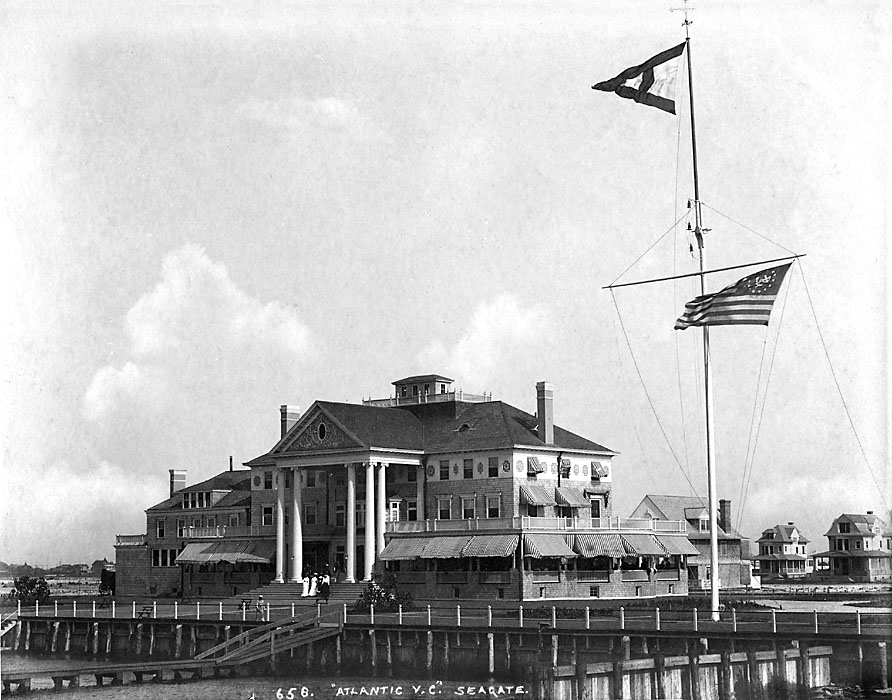
The Atlantic Yacht Club building, which burned down in 1933

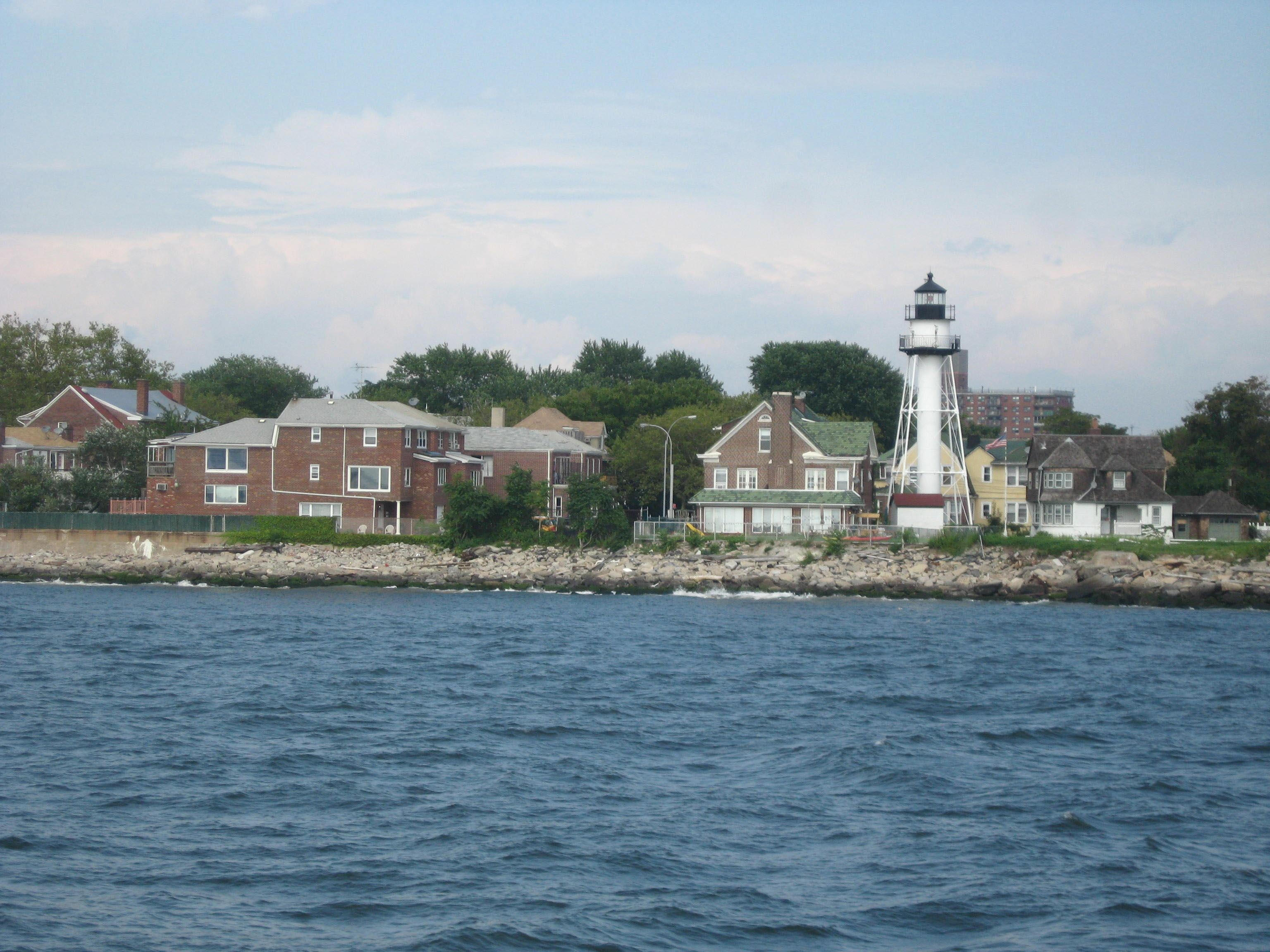
Coney Island Light, also known as Norton's Point Light

Sea Gate is a private gated community at the far western end of Coney Island at the southwestern tip of the New York City borough of Brooklyn. Located on the portion of the Coney Island peninsula west of West 37th Street, it contains mostly single-family homes, some directly on Gravesend Bay.

== History ==
The area that is now Sea Gate was once known as Norton's Point. "Norton" was the name of the owner of a casino, which was situated where the Coney Island Light now stands. The neighborhood held a reputation for gambling before it was developed into a residential neighborhood.

Sea Gate was developed into a full neighborhood in 1892 by developer Alrick Man. By 1899, Sea Gate property owners included the Morgan, Dodge, and Vanderbilt families. Governor Al Smith and others frequented the Atlantic Yacht Club, whose clubhouse was designed by Stanford White. Sea Gate is surrounded on three sides by water with private beaches. In 1995, the Army Corps of Engineers completed its work of replenishing Coney beaches and building new jetties, including a long jetty at the border of Sea Gate and Coney Island.

In October 2012, Hurricane Sandy devastated the neighborhood, which was inundated by ocean water and battered by strong winds. The area sustained significant damage and numerous houses were destroyed. The "Lindy Park" sea wall/bulkhead (officially known as Beach Reservation extending from Beach 48th Street to Beach 50th Street) was destroyed leaving Sea Gate, Coney Island and beyond open to any rough seas and additional damage.

== Description ==
Sea Gate is a gated community on the Coney Island peninsula west of West 37th Street. Residents refer to Sea Gate as "the gate" and venturing into adjoining Coney Island as going "out the gate". There are no stores in the neighborhood. There are express buses to Manhattan, which take an average of 80 minutes. Sea Gate is made up of 850 single-family houses in a variety of architectural styles, including Queen Anne Style and Mediterranean.

Residents pay for private security (Sea Gate Public Safety Department) as well as sewer, beach, lifeguards, street lights, and street cleaning.

There are two points of interest in Sea Gate. Located on Beach 47th Street in Sea Gate is the 75-foot-tall (23 m) Coney Island Light, is a lighthouse built in 1890, before the area was populated. The lighthouse is the former home of Frank Schubert, the United States' last civilian lighthouse keeper, who died in 2003. The chapel in Sea Gate, once used for services and built in 1901, is a historical building now used for social events, yoga classes, and is a polling site at election times. The Chapel with its stained-glass windows is the first structure seen when entering the main security gate.

In addition to large and private beach areas, Sea Gate has two parks:

- A playground with a basketball court and children's jungle gym pieces next to the Sea Gate Community Center on Surf Avenue.
- Beach Reservation (as referred to on the map of Sea Gate, VI.a, 1894) is near the Coney Island Light and extends before and beyond Norton's Point. A sandy/grassy patch of land with views of Lower New York Harbor and the Verrazzano–Narrows Bridge. It is nicknamed "Lindy Park", commemorating Charles Lindbergh.

=== Public Safety ===
Sea Gate, which is in the confines of Community District 10, is patrolled by the 60th Precinct of the NYPD, located at 2951 West 8th Street in Brooklyn, NY.

=== Controversy ===
There have been some controversial cases involving the Sea Gate Public Safety Department.

In 2013, Christopher Simmons, a Black officer with the Sea Gate Public Safety Department filed a federal discrimination and retaliation lawsuit alleging that the Sea Gate Association's president called him a "schwartze" (a Yiddish racial slur for "Black") and that he was passed over for promotion, demoted, and then fired. In 2020, residents of Sea Gate called for the head of the Sea Gate Public Safety Department to resign amid accusations of racism and nepotism. Residents also filed a lawsuit against the Sea Gate Homeowners Association, alleging non-white residents were harassed for not providing IDs, vehicles were followed outside of the boundaries of the gates, and that discrimination occurred against Black members of the Public Safety force.

Another incident, in 2020, involved an off-duty New York Police Department officer being contacted by a Sea Gate Public Safety Department officer (despite not being in Sea Gate) and questioned, with the Sea Gate officer allegedly drawing his firearm twice. The NYPD (now retired) officer, took legal action.

== Demographics ==
Sea Gate is largely populated by families living in single- and two-family houses, 54 percent being rentals. As of 2000, the median age was 38.6 years and the median household income was $41,659. In addition to city and state taxes, residents also pay dues and charges to the Sea Gate Association, which have averaged $3,000 per year.

In 1960, Sea Gate was 99 percent white, and by the 2010 census, Sea Gate was 83 percent white. The community became majority Jewish by the 1930s; prior to the 1930s, there were signs in the community reading "no dogs or Jews". Many Hasidic Jews and Russians have settled in Sea Gate, along with a small number of middle-class Black families. Tensions around race and class exist between Sea Gate and the rest of Coney Island which has a significantly larger Black and Latino population. Both Sea Gate homeowners association and their public safety department have been frequently accused of racism and have been the subject of multiple federal lawsuits.

== Transportation ==
Public access to Sea Gate is available from Surf Avenue on the B36 and from Mermaid Avenue on the B74. Express service to/from Manhattan is also available south of Neptune Avenue on the X28 and X38.

=== Police and crime ===
Sea Gate, which is in the confines of Community District 10, is patrolled by the 60th Precinct of the NYPD, located at 2951 West 8th Street in Brooklyn, NY.

== Education ==
New York City Department of Education is the local school district.

The local elementary school is P.S. 188 Michael E. Berdy. In 1979 Black children made up over 90% of the student body. The school was named after a soldier who died in the Vietnam War; Berdy, a White American, was an alumnus of the school. In 1979 the school held an essay contest for students on which person the school should be named after. Several students had nominated Berdy, and Berdy was chosen as the school's namesake.

== Notable residents ==
- Chaim Zanvl Abramowitz (1902–1995), "the Ribnitzer Rebbe"
- Austin Basis (born 1976), actor
- Mordechai Ben David and his son, Yeedle, singers
- Jeffrey Epstein (1953–2019), Wall Street financier and convicted sex offender
- Mark Epstein (born 1954), property developer, and the brother of Jeffrey Epstein
- Leonard Everett Fisher (1924–2024), writer (The Jetty Chronicles)
- Jack Foley (1891–1967), inventor of movie sound effects techniques
- Yossi Green (born 1955), Jewish music composer
- Moss Hart (1904–1961), playwright and theatre director
- Itzik Manger (1901–1969), Yiddish poet and writer
- Ludwig Satz (1891–1944), Yiddish theater and film actor
- Andrea Batista Schlesinger (born 1976), political writer and campaigner who was executive director of the Drum Major Institute
- Frank Schubert (1915–2003), last civilian lighthouse keeper in the United States
- Sandra Seacat (1936–2023), actress/acting teacher and coach (lived there as Sandra Kaufman, her then-married name, for most of the 1960s)
- Harriet Shorr (1939–2016), artist, writer, poet and professor who was known for large-scale realistic still life paintings.
- Beverly Sills (1929–2007), opera singer
- Isaac Bashevis Singer (1902–1991), Yiddish author
- Ernst Steiger (1832–1917), bookseller, publisher and bibliographer.
- Jake Steinfeld (born 1958), actor, fitness specialist and fitness trainer
