= Andrea Batista Schlesinger =

American political writer and campaigner (born 1976)

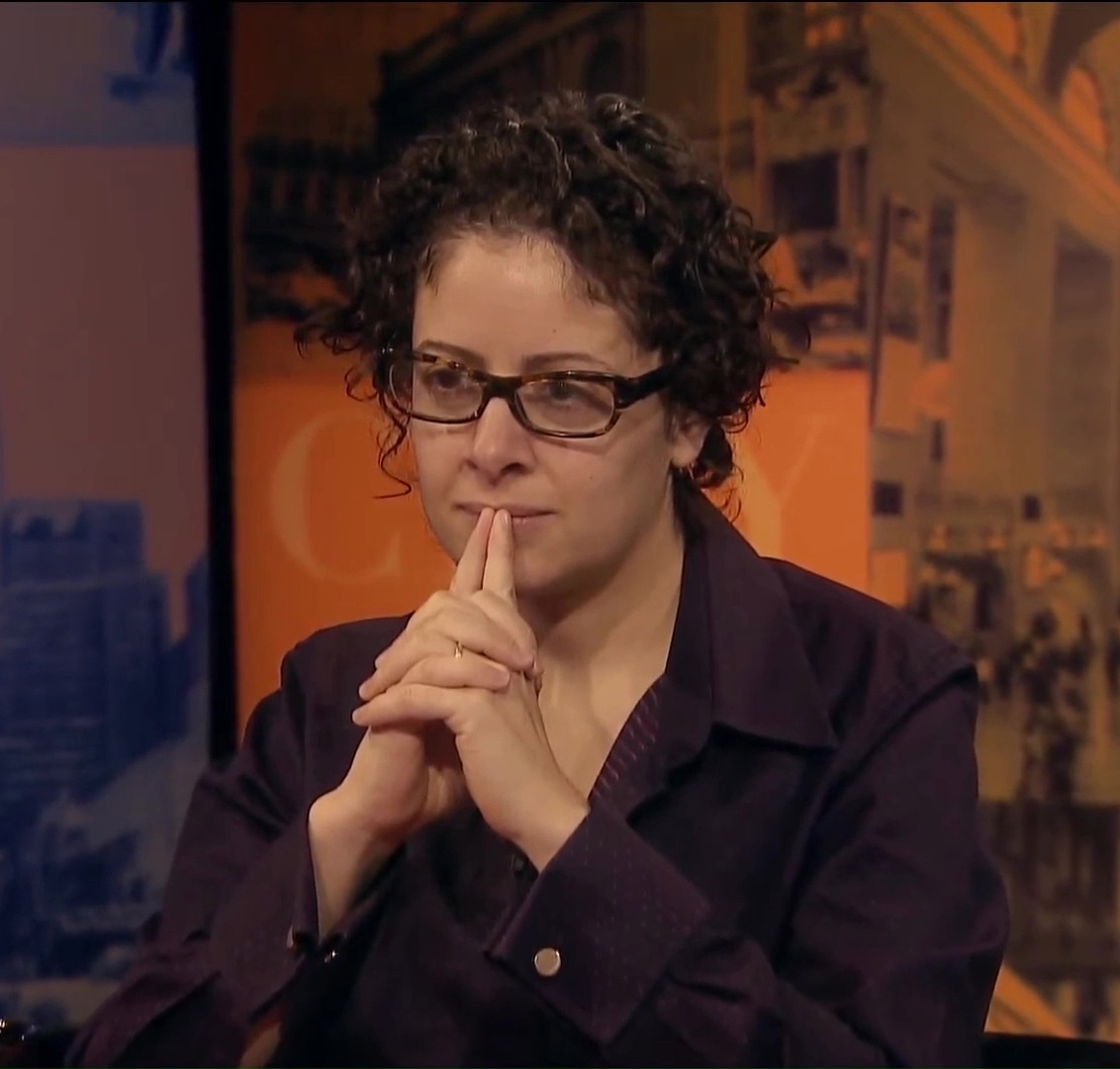
- Schlesinger on CUNY TV's City Talk, 2013
- Born: October 27, 1976 (age 49); Brooklyn, New York City, U.S.
- Education: University of Chicago
- Occupations: Political writer and campaigner

Andrea Batista Schlesinger (born October 27, 1976) is an American political writer and campaigner. She was until 2009 the executive director of the Drum Major Institute.

== Early life and education ==
Schlesinger was born and raised in Brooklyn, New York, by a Dominican mother and a Jewish father. She grew up in Sea Gate, Brooklyn. She was appointed as the student representative to the New York City Board of Education while a student at Edward R. Murrow High School, and later studied public policy at the University of Chicago.

== Career ==
She directed a national campaign to engage college students in the discussion on the future of Social Security for the Pew Charitable Trusts, and served as Director of Public Relations of Teach For America before working as the education advisor to Bronx Borough President Fernando Ferrer.

From 2002 to 2009, Schlesinger led the Drum Major Institute, a think tank founded in 1961 during the American Civil Rights Movement by Harry H. Wachtel. During her tenure as executive director, DMI released several policy papers to national audiences. including: Congress at the Midterm: Their Middle-Class Record and Principles for an Immigration Policy to Strengthen and Expand the American Middle Class. In February 2009, she took leave from that position to work as a policy adviser to the re-election campaign of Mayor of New York City Michael Bloomberg.

She is currently serving as a board member for The New York Women's Foundation.

== Publications ==
Schlesinger's work has been published in New York Newsday, Crains New York Business, the Mississippi Sun Herald, New York Daily News, Alternet.com, Tom Paine.com, New York Sun, Colorlines Magazine, The Chief-Leader, and City Limits Magazine. She is also a contributor to The Huffington Post and is on the editorial board at The Nation.

== Awards and recognition ==
- Awarded “40 under 40 Rising Star” by Crain's New York Business
- Named “35 under 40 Rising Stars, The Next Generation of Political Leaders in New York” by City Hall Newspaper
- Recipient of LatinaPAC's Dolores Huerta Award for "making great strides in promoting progress in our community"
- Named “Expert of the Week” by Fenton Communications' and the White House Project’s "SheSource" program, a project promoting left-wing women policy experts to television and radio.
