= Moonrise Kingdom (soundtrack) =

Moonrise Kingdom (Original Soundtrack)

Soundtrack album by Various artists
- Released: May 15, 2012
- Genres: Classical; opera; orchestral
- Length: 1:04:11
- Label: ABKCO
- Producers: Wes Anderson; Randall Poster

Moonrise Kingdom (Original Soundtrack) is the accompanying soundtrack album for the identically named 2012 coming-of-age comedy-drama film released on May 15, 2012 through ABKCO Records. The soundtrack album featured original compositions from Alexandre Desplat and supplemented existing music by Benjamin Britten, as well as classical songs from Hank Williams, Leonard Bernstein, Frank Schubert and Françoise Hardy. Both Anderson and Randall Poster compiled the film's soundtrack.

The soundtrack was positively received by music critics and analysts, and was listed in several year-end and decade-end lists of "best soundtracks". It also topped the Billboard Classical Albums chart upon release. Desplat's score suite which was separated into five different tracks, and Mark Mothersbaugh's theme was bundled into a separate score album, that was released on June 19, 2012 by ABKCO.

== Background ==
The Britten music had a huge effect on the whole movie, I think. The movie's sort of set to it. The play of Noye's Fludde that is performed in it—my older brother and I were actually in a production of that when I was ten or eleven, and that music is something I've always remembered, and made a very strong impression on me. It is the color of the movie in a way.

— Wes Anderson, on the use of Benjamin Britten's compositions at the film's Cannes premiere

The soundtrack to Moonrise Kingdom featured compositions from Benjamin Britten, who was notable for many children's musicals. Anderson, who has been heavily interested in Britten's music, since early-2000s had thought about Britten's numerous compositions that were written for children. He supplemented those tracks, with the help of music supervisor Randall Poster, in their seventh collaboration; they worked together since Anderson's feature directorial debut Bottle Rocket (1996). The use of Britten's music had matched Anderson's sensibilities as an auteur, as according to him, "they are classical pieces that are meant to have an audience of children, but are not written down to children — they're meant to educate children in what classical music really is. Britten seemed really motivated by that." Several classical songs from Hank Williams, Leonard Bernstein, Frank Schubert and Françoise Hardy being used.

The lead protagonists Sam (Jared Gilman) and Suzy (Kara Hayward) met first at a rehearsal for stage production of Britten's Noye's Fludde (transl. Noah's Flood); the opera served as an integral part of the story as Anderson was nearly ten or eleven, when he first performed the choir for Noye's Fludde. In an interview to Pitchfork, Anderson had stated the use of Noye's Fludde, saying "when people write rock'n'roll music they're writing it for their band or themselves — it's generally not written for somebody else to do. That's been the predominant mode for some time [...] Britten conducted and produced and directed the first production of Noye's Fludde, but after that, it becomes something where a group of people in Texas can get all these pieces of sheet music, and this instruction manual, and do their own take on it. I bet it's a fun thing to experience different versions of what you've written."

For Bruce Willis' character, Anderson used a collection of Hank Williams' during the editing process. He stated "when we edited together the first scene with him, my editor (Andrew Weisblum) and I thought that something needed to be on the radio and our editing room was downstairs from our apartment so I got a few things and tried them. I tried some Hank Williams and that seemed right and next thing we knew we were putting it in every time he appeared and it became his sound." Alexandre Desplat also conducted few incerpts from Britten's music in separate sections, which Anderson had said "the orchestra functions as a metaphor for the way a movie works, or something like that. I think it all involved out of Britten's idea of taking this thing apart this way." Apart from the compilation songs, the album also featured score cues composed by Desplat. Five of the original score tracks were featured in the soundtrack, and was later released separately in a score album by ABKCO in June 2012.

== Track listing ==
No.	Title	Writer(s)	Performer(s)	Length
1.	"The Young Person's Guide to the Orchestra, Op. 34: Themes A-F"	Benjamin Britten	Leonard Bernstein featuring New York Philharmonic	03:22
2.	"Camp Ivanhoe Cadence Medley"	Mark Mothersbaugh	Peter Jarvis and His Drum Corps	01:36
3.	"Simple Symphony, Op. 4: Playful Pizzicato"	Benjamin Britten	Benjamin Britten featuring English Chamber Orchestra	03:02
4.	"Kaw-Liga" (Single Version)	Hank Williams, Fred Rose	Hank Williams, Drifting Cowboys	02:33
5.	"Noye's Fludde, Op. 59: Noye, Noye, Take Thou Thy Company"	Benjamin Britten	Caroline Clack, Chorus Of Animals, Darian Angadi, David Pinto, Eileen O'Donovan, Marie-Therese Pinto, Merlin Channon, Norman Del Mar, Owen Brannigan, Stephen Alexander, English Opera Group, Trevor Anthony	06:07
6.	"The Heroic Weather-Conditions of the Universe, Part 1: A Veiled Mist"	Alexandre Desplat	Alexandre Desplat	03:14
7.	"The Heroic Weather-Conditions of the Universe, Part 2: Smoke/Fire"	Alexandre Desplat	Alexandre Desplat	02:52
8.	"The Heroic Weather-Conditions of the Universe, Part 3: The Salt Air"	Alexandre Desplat	Alexandre Desplat	01:58
9.	"A Midsummer Night's Dream, Act 2: On The Ground, Sleep Sound"	Benjamin Britten, Peter Pears, William Shakespeare	Benjamin Britten, Choir Of Downside School, London Symphony Orchestra, Wandsworth School Boys Choir	03:04
10.	"Long Gone Lonesome Blues" (Single Version)	Hank Williams	Hank Williams, Drifting Cowboys	02:37
11.	"Le Carnaval des Animaux: Grand Fantaisie Zoologique: X. Volière"	Camille Saint-Saëns	Leonard Bernstein, New York Philharmonic	01:17
12.	"Le Temps de L'Amour"	Jacques Dutronc, Morisse, Salvet	Françoise Hardy	02:24
13.	"An die Musik"	Franz Schubert	Alexandra Rubner, Christopher Manien	02:26
14.	"Ramblin' Man" (Single Version)	Hank Williams	Hank Williams, Drifting Cowboys	03:02
15.	"Songs From Friday Afternoons, Op. 7: Old Abram Brown"	Benjamin Britten	Benjamin Britten, Choir Of Downside School, Viola Tunnard	03:28
16.	"The Heroic Weather-Conditions of the Universe, Part 4-6: Thunder, Lightning and Rain"	Alexandre Desplat	Alexandre Desplat	05:00
17.	"Noye's Fludde, Op. 59: The Spacious Firmament On High" (Edit)	Benjamin Britten	Caroline Clack, Chorus Of Animals, Darian Angadi, David Pinto, Eileen O'Donovan, Gillian Saunders, Kathleen Petch, Margaret Hawes, Marie-Therese Pinto, Merlin Channon, Norman Del Mar, Owen Brannigan, Patricia Garrod, Sheila Rex, Stephen Alexander, English Opera Group, Trevor Anthony	05:17
18.	"Noye's Fludde, Op. 59: Noye, Take Thy Wife Anone" (Edit)	Benjamin Britten	Chorus Of Animals, Darian Angadi, David Pinto, Merlin Channon, Norman Del Mar, Sheila Rex, Stephen Alexander, English Opera Group, Trevor Anthony	02:11
19.	"The Young Person's Guide to the Orchestra, Op. 34: Fugue: Allegro Molto"	Benjamin Britten	Leonard Bernstein, New York Philharmonic	03:05
20.	"Songs From Friday Afternoons, Op. 7: Cuckoo"	Benjamin Britten	Benjamin Britten, Choir Of Downside School, Viola Tunnard	01:36
21.	"The Heroic Weather-Conditions of the Universe, Part 7: After The Storm"	Alexandre Desplat	Alexandre Desplat	03:55

== Reception ==
Steven Hyden of The A.V. Club described the Moonrise Kingdom soundtrack "as tasteful and impeccably curated as you'd expect". Alarm's Meaghann Korbel wrote "the soundtrack is really couldn't be more perfect for the story: children are teaching adults about matters beyond their own comprehension, whether it's life's complexities or the intricacies of developing a classical composition with a full-on orchestra — as though it's just that easy." Gerard Harris of Tuppence Magazine had stated it as "a fun soundtrack album that's got as much of a root in comedy as it does in musicality, matching the flow of the film perfectly". Heather Phares of AllMusic wrote "While Moonrise Kingdom's choices set it apart from other Anderson films, its effortless flow, appropriateness, and vivid beauty make it another fine musical companion to his work."

Paul Taylor of LemonWire stated "The use of classical music in "Moonrise Kingdom" is closely connected to the two young protagonists. They meet during a church production of Britten's "Noye's Fludde". While it seems like a strange choice for a film. And you won't see many other soundtracks like this one. But the presence of classical music in particular brings a sense of romantic adventure to the film" and concluded it as "another soundtrack that works better when heard with the film". Faded Glamour wrote "the soundtrack is a classic Anderson compilation of 50s rock and roll and classical music with a trademark French track nestled in for extra flavour." The Hollywood Reporter's Todd McCarthy wrote "Music by Britten is dominant, particularly from Noye's Fludde (Noah's Flood), a work by the English composer first performed in 1958 that could have been appropriated by Anderson for use in this watery context or, more likely, served as inspiration for the inundation that climaxes the film. The way Britten is joined on the track by a mix of Saint-Saens, Mozart, Schubert, Hank Williams and Desplat is remarkable and deserving of an essay of its own." IndieWire, MTV, and Entertainment Weekly called it as one of "the best soundtracks of 2012", while MovieWeb, /Film, IndieWire, and Screenrant listed it as one of the "best soundtracks of the decade".

== Analysis ==
The use of Benjamin Britten's music has been subjected to critical analysis. The Guardian's Peter Bradshaw had stated "the music is an interesting assertion of the uncool, stolidly Anglo-Saxon character of this parochial, islanded corner of America – evoked not with conventional nostalgia, rather with a connoisseurship of how strange and different it seems." In an article to The New Yorker magazine, classical musician and music teacher, Russell Platt had stated the use of Noye's Fludde as "so transformative is its place at the core of the story, and not just in the mere outlines of its plot". Platt also highlighted the use of Hank Williams songs to underline the forlorn quality of Bruce Willis's policeman, and of the Françoise Hardy song, coming out of the portable record player in the beach-dance sequence are examples of "classic use of diegetic music which are and highly effective".

The musical composition, The Young Person's Guide to the Orchestra is played in the opening sequence. Kristian Lin of Fort Worth Weekly, had said:

The music compartmentalizes different sections of the orchestra, which chimes with the way Anderson introduces Suzy and the members of her family. They're shown in separate rooms and not communicating with each other, indicative of how emotionally disconnected they are from each other. The measured precision of the music matches Anderson's extensively mapped-out camera movements and mise-en-scene [...] The film's end credits include Moonrise Kingdom's composer Alexandre Desplat's tribute to the Young Person's Guide, with a narrator introducing each separate instrument as it makes its entrance.

Considering the use of Britten's opera aria, A Midsummer Night's Dream, Lin said "the selection is a choral lullaby sung by the fairies to the four mortal lovers who have fallen asleep in the forest. It's used in the movie as the background for the great montage of Sam and Suzy writing letters to each other while snippets of their rough lives play out silently. The shifting chromatic harmonies of the piece (not to mention the coolly detached tone of the kids' letters) helps prevent the innate pathos of Sam and Suzy's childhood from becoming too pronounced."

Two selections from Friday Afternoons: "Old Abram Brown" and "Cuckoo" play in the film. Lin called the latter as piercing selection, as the track, which based on Jane Taylor's "Twinkle, Twinkle, Little Star" was played twice. Lin stated that "Despite the song's brighter hues and the lyrics sung from a bird's point of view, it's still filled with overtones of wistfulness and loss."

== Accolades ==
The film's soundtrack album and the score, was intended to be shortlisted for Best Compilation Soundtrack and Best Score Soundtrack for visual media, but ultimately could not get selected.

Award	Date of ceremony	Category	Recipient(s)	Result	Ref(s)
Boston Society of Film Critics	December 9, 2012	Best Use of Music in a Film	Moonrise Kingdom	Won	
Guild of Music Supervisors Awards	February 20, 2013	Best Music Supervision for Films Budgeted Under $25 Million	Randall Poster	Nominated	
IndieWire Critics Poll	December 18, 2012	Best Original Score/Soundtrack	Alexandre Desplat	4th place	
St. Louis Film Critics Association	December 11, 2012	Best Music	Moonrise Kingdom	Won (tied with Django Unchained)	

== Charts ==
Chart (2012)	Peak position
US Billboard 200	158
US Current Albums (Billboard)	187
US Classical Albums (Billboard)	1
US Soundtrack Albums (Billboard)	3
