= Coney Island Light =

Lighthouse in Brooklyn, New York

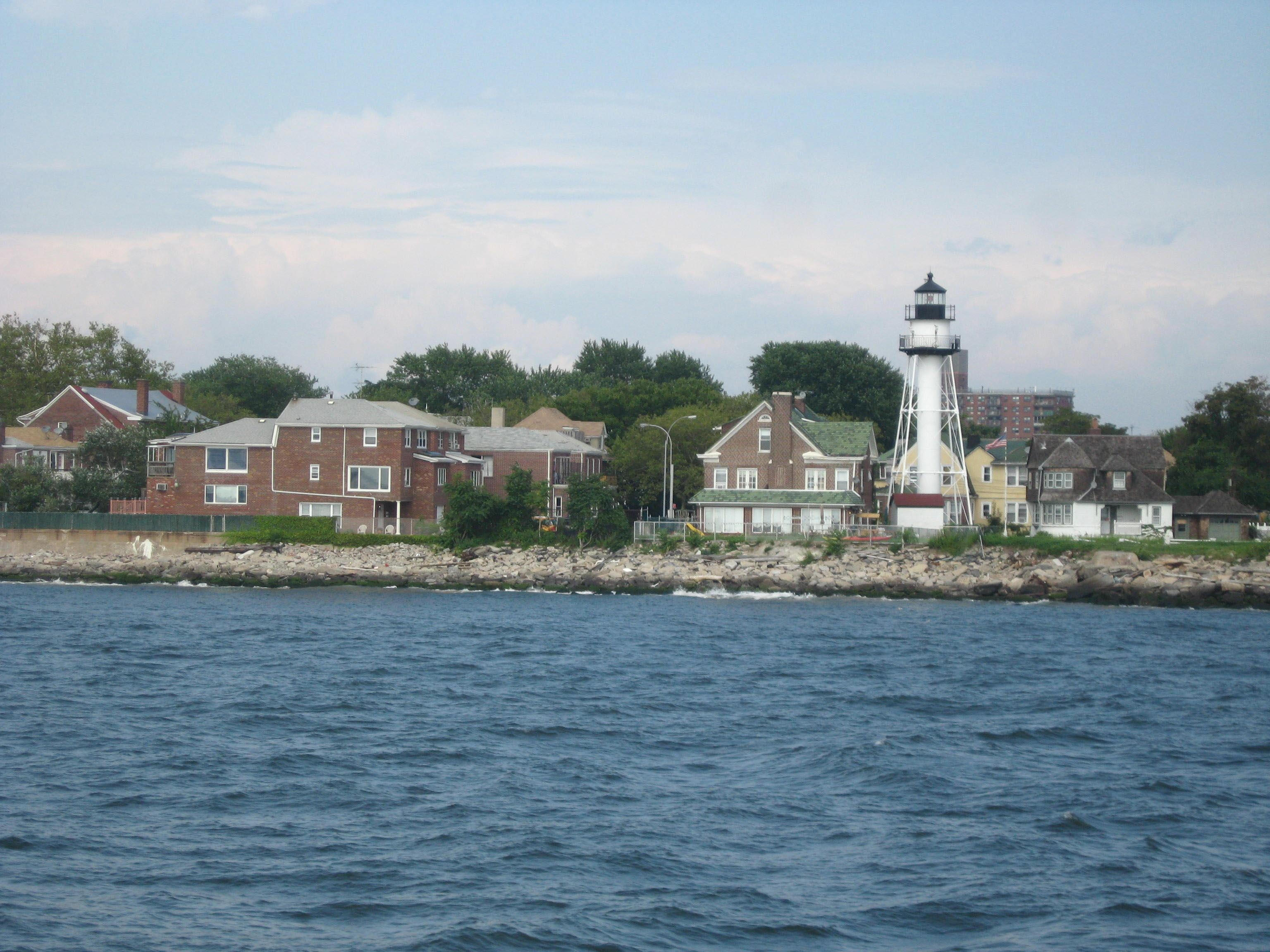
- Seen in 2008
- Location: Sea Gate, Brooklyn, New York City
- Coordinates: 40°34′36″N 74°00′42″W

Tower
- Constructed: 1890
- Foundation: Steel pile
- Construction: Steel
- Automated: 1989
- Height: 23 m (75 ft)
- Shape: Square
- Markings: Skeletal white tower with black trim

Light
- First lit: 1920
- Focal height: 75 feet (23 m)
- Lens: Fourth Order fresnel lens
- Range: 16 nmi (30 km; 18 mi)
- Characteristic: Flashing Red 5 seconds

Coney Island Light (also Nortons Point Light) is a lighthouse located in Sea Gate, on the west end of Coney Island, Brooklyn, in New York City, east of New York Harbor's main channel.

The lighthouse was first established in 1890. The current tower was first lit in 1920 and is still operational. It was automated in 1989. The foundation material is steel pile and the lighthouse is made out of steel. It is a skeletal white tower with black trim. The original lens was a fourth order Fresnel lens put up in 1890. The most recent resident keeper was Frank Schubert (1915–2003), who was among the last civilian lighthouse keepers in the United States. Schubert worked for the United States Coast Guard since 1939, serving at Coney Island since 1960.

The Long Island chapter of Sons of the American Revolution has published a history of the light. In 2026, the New York City Landmarks Preservation Commission voted to consider granting city landmark designation to the Coney Island Light and its adjacent keeper's dwelling.
