= Harriet Shorr =

American artist, writer, poet and professor

- Born: 1939
- Died: April 9, 2016 (aged 76); New York, US
- Occupations: American artist, writer, poet and professor

Harriet Shorr (1939 – 9 April 2016 in New York), was an American artist, writer, poet and professor. She was known for large-scale realistic still life paintings.

== Life ==
Harriet Shorr was born in 1939 and grew up in Sea Gate in Brooklyn. She received her BA from Swarthmore College in 1960 and BFA from Yale School of Art and Architecture in 1962. After graduating from Swarthmore and earning BFA from Yale Shorr returned to Swartmore College to teach art. From 1963 to 1974 she directed Swarthmore's Studio Arts Program. In 1971 Shorr was selected a McDowell Fellow and worked in Alexander studio.
Shorr was a member of the Foundation's Artists Advisory Committee that initiated and developed the Sharpe Walentas Studio Program as a service to living artists. She was a professor emerita of art and design at Purchase College.

Her second marriage was to artist Jim Long (1949–2024) and she had two daughters, Ruth and Sasha, with her first husband, artist Eugene Baguskas(1933–2026 ). Harriet Shorr died on April 9, 2016, at Beth Israel Hospital at the age of 76.

== Art ==
Harriet Shorr is mainly considered as a realist artist, however during life her work has transitioned from observation of everyday objects and domestic items painted when she was at Swarthmore, to the objects placed on scarves that she painted after she came to New York, and to objects that are carefully chosen for literary, mythological, or metaphorical possibilities.

While selecting objects for the painting Shorr consciously tried not to look for them with a specific agenda in mind, nor questioned what makes them click together. When all the objects were gathered, she arranged the items on a table in her studio trying to vary the spaces between them.

Shorr didn't believe in a necessary connection between drawing and painting and did no preliminary drawing for her still life works. She used bristle brushes for the larger areas of color and longhaired brushes for the more precise modeling, created the different shapes, their shadows and the spaces between shapes, maintaining the fluidity of the painting and the practice of painting wet-into-wet that she developed after studying with Alex Katz at the Yale School of Art and Architecture.

Shorr demonstrates her method of direct painting in her book The Artist’s Eye. Her subject matter is still life, which Shorr believed is the most compatible with her method of painting.

Shorr was one of four realist still life painters who experimented painting the same four objects not revealing the results to one another until all four paintings were done. They repeated the same experiment ten years later and presented the results in the group exhibition Four Artists, Four Objects, Ten Years (1997). Among four artists Shorr appeared to be the most abstract in her approach.

The 2005 exhibition Cythera marked a new direction for Shorr, who is known for her more straightforward still lifes. Here, she attempted radically new works that wrestle with allegory in the guise of porcelain figurines, textiles, flowers, branches and reflective surfaces.

Shorr was among 7 artists selected for the study of Margery B. Franklin and Bernard Kaplan presented in their book Development and the Arts: Critical Perspectives (1994).

Her paintings are a part of collections at numerous organizations, among them Citicorp, Hyatt, Hess Corporation, Estee Lauder Companies, ARCO, and others.

== Exhibitions ==
=== Solo exhibition (selected) ===
- 2009, Objects of Use to Me, Cheryl Pelavin Fine Art. New York, NY
- 2008, From the Studio, Cheryl Pelavin Fine Art, New York, NY
- 2007, Persephone, Cheryl Pelavin Fine Art, New York, NY
- 2005, Cythera, Cheryl Pelavin Fine Art New York, NY
- 2004, Paintings 1992–2004, Clarion University Art Gallery, Clarion, PA
- 2002, 2001 New Paintings and Monotypes, Cheryl Pelavin Fine Art,
- 1999, Monotypes, Neuberger Museum of Art, Purchase College, Purchase, NY
- 1995, Paintings and Watercolors, The Museum of East Texas, Lufkin, TX
- 1993, The Gallery of Contemporary Art, University of Colorado, Colorado Springs, CO
- 1991, Recent Paintings and Monotypes, Rahr West Museum, Manitowac, WI
- 1989, 1987, 1979 Tatistcheff and Co., New York, NY
- 1989, Monotypes, Editions Limited Gallery, Indianapolis, IN
- 1984, 1983, 1980, 1979 Fischbach Gallery, New York, NY
- 1984, Art Gallery, University of Pennsylvania, Pittsburgh, PA
- 1983, Ivory-Kimpton Gallery, San Francisco, CA
- 1973, 1972 Green Mountain Gallery, New York, NY
- 1970, Gross McCleaf Gallery, Philadelphia, PA

=== Group exhibitions (selected) ===
- 2009, American Academy Invitational Exhibition of Visual Arts, American Academy of Arts and Letters, New York, NY
- 2003, Members Exhibition, National Academy of Design, New York, NY
- 2002, Between Still Life and Landscape, Delaware Center for Contemporary Arts, Wilmington, DE
- 1999, Awards Exhibition, The American Academy of Arts and Letters, New York, NY
- 1998, Artists Choose Artists, The Century Association New York, NY
- 1997, Four Artists/Four Objects: Tenth Anniversary Project, Fischbach Gallery, New York, NY
- 1996, Women in the Visual Arts, Hollins University, Hollins, VA
- 1991, Intaglio Printing in the 80s, Jane Voorhees Zimmerli Art Museum, Rutgers, NJ
- 1991, Presswork: The Art of Women Printmakers, National Museum of Women in the Arts, Washington, D.C.
- 1988, Realism Today: American Drawings from the Rita Rich Collection, National Academy of Design, New York, NY
- 1986, Nature Morte : The Museum Considers the Still Life, Southern Alleghenies Museum of Art, Lorretto, PA
- 1985, American 20th Century Watercolors and Drawings, San Francisco Museum of Modern Art, San Francisco, CA
- 1982, Eight Women/Still Life, New Britain Museum of American Art, New Britain, CT
- 1981, Collector's Gallery, Marion Koogler McNay Art Museum, San Antonio, TX
- 1974, New Images in American Art, Queens Museum, New York, NY

=== Collections (selected) ===
- Chicago Art Institute, Chicago, IL
- Brooklyn Museum, Brooklyn, NY
- Utah Museum of Fine Art, Salt Lake City, UT
- The Fralin Museum of Art, Charlottesville, VA
- Tennessee State Museum, Nashville, TN

== Awards ==
- 2009 The Emil and Dines Carlsen Award in Painting N.A.D
- 2000 The Pollock-Krasner Award
- 1999 Purchase Award, American Academy of Arts and Letters
- 1994 American Artist Achievement Award
- 1994 Member of National Academy of Design
- 1980 National Endowment of the Arts

== Books ==
- 1991, The Artist's Eye: A Perceptual Way of Painting. Harriet Shorr. Watson- Guptill. (Illus.)
- 2001, The Artist's Eye: A Perceptual Way of Painting. 2nd ed. Harriet Shorr. Watson-Guptill. (Illus.)
