= Ernst Steiger =

American bookseller, publisher and bibliographer

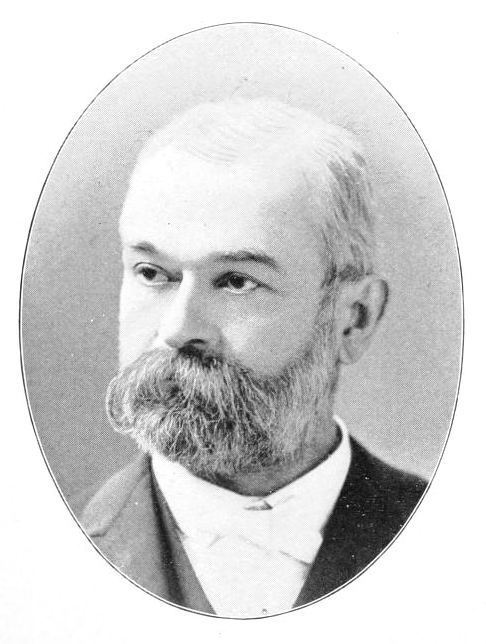
- Born: October 4, 1832; Gastewitz, Kingdom of Saxony
- Died: August 2, 1917 (aged 84); Sea Gate, Long Island, U.S.
- Occupation: Bookseller

Ernst Steiger (October 4, 1832 - August 2, 1917) was an American bookseller, publisher and bibliographer.

== Background ==
Steiger was born in Gastewitz (near Mutzschen) in the Kingdom of Saxony, on October 4, 1832. His father was a farmer. He was apprenticed on February 14, 1848 for five years, to Bernhard Hermann, a bookseller in Leipzig, eventually rising from errand boy to office clerk. In 1853 he moved to Dresden and went to work at the bookshop of W. Türk.

== In America ==
Steiger emigrated in 1855 to New York City to take a position with B. Westermann & Co. (Westermann was Hermann's brother-in-law), in which he became a silent partner.

Having already purchased a periodical business, in 1866 he opened an independent business for himself, as a bookkeeper, importer of German language publications, and eventually publisher. Steiger spoke not only his native German, but also English, French and Spanish, which he had learned as by means of constantly seeking conversations in those languages in his leisure time; and acquired a smattering of several others. He became the publisher of important works of German Americans and of language textbooks, and also a manufacturer and importer of materials for the newly imported Kindergarten system. Steiger was the author of Der Nachdruck in Nordamerika (New York, 1860); Das Copyright-Law in den Vereinigten Staaten (1869); and Periodical Literature, a bibliography (1873), and The Periodical Literature of the United States of America: With Indexes and Appendices, as well as the Steiger's Educational Directory series.

By 1898, he was the recipient of the Prussian Order of the Crown and the Imperial Austrian Order of Franz Joseph.

He died August 2, 1917, at his summer home at Sea Gate, Long Island. He was survived by a wife, his son Ernst Jr. and three daughters. Ernst Jr. and one of his sisters were by then partners in E. Steiger & Co.
