= Drum Major Institute =

American progressive think tank

Drum Major Institute for Public Policy
- Founder: Harry H. Wachtel
- Established: 1961; 65 years ago
- Focus: Progressive advocacy
- Key people: Martin Luther King III, James Forbes, William Wachtel, Andrew Young
- Budget: $1.27 million (2024)
- Location: New York, New York, United States
- Website: drummajorinst.org

The Drum Major Institute for Public Policy (DMI) is a non-profit American progressive think tank and community action group. The group was founded in 1961 in the midst of the Civil Rights Movement. It later became defunct until it was relaunched in 1999. It is headquartered in New York City. DMI's stated mission is "creating commonsense solutions to drive social progress for all American citizens."

== History ==
The Drum Major Foundation (later Institute) was founded in 1961 during the American Civil Rights Movement by Harry H. Wachtel, a New York City lawyer who was an adviser to Martin Luther King Jr. The organization became more or less defunct after King's assassination in April 1968, but was relaunched in 1999 by King's son Martin Luther III, Wachtel's son William, and King confidant Andrew Young.

Martin Luther King Jr. often used the phrase "drum major instinct," meaning the instinct to be a leader. In his sermon at the Ebenezer Baptist Church in Atlanta, Georgia, on February 4, 1968, he said: "If you want to say that I was a drum major, say that I was a drum major for justice, say that I was a drum major for peace, say that I was a drum major for righteousness. And all of the other shallow things will not matter... I just want to leave a committed life behind."

The director of the institute from 2002 through 2004 was Fernando Ferrer, the former Borough president of the Bronx, who resigned from the institute at the end of 2004 to run for mayor of New York City. Donations to Ferrer's mayoral campaign helped pay for DMI's operations. From 2004 through 2010, Andrea Batista Schlesinger was the institute's executive director. P.J. Kim was named the organization's executive director in 2010.

Donors to DMI have included labor unions, health care companies and real estate groups.

== Activities ==
According to its website, DMI focuses on a few main areas: immigration policy, combating tort reform, and, more generally, policies that they feel benefit the middle class. DMI has issued legislative scorecards for the United States Congress and the New York Legislature which grade elected officials on their votes relating to issues that DMI perceives as being important to achieving a middle class standard of living.

DMI's Civil Justice Fellowship, originally called the Milberg Weiss Fellowship because it was funded by the indicted plaintiffs' law firm Milberg Weiss, was created to oppose tort reform.

Since 2002, the Drum Major Institute has hosted a series of discussions called the Marketplace of Ideas, progressive speakers series which highlights a public policy which is presented by the official who helped put it in place.

DMI supported New York City's mandatory paid sick leave law.

DMI has hosted events featuring Bill Clinton, John Edwards, Howard Dean and Eliot Spitzer.

In 2008, as part of a joint project with the magazine The Nation, DMI interviewed mayors across the country on urban issues. The goal of the project was to help add urban issues to the presidential race.
