= Frank Schubert =

American lighthouse keeper (1915–2003)

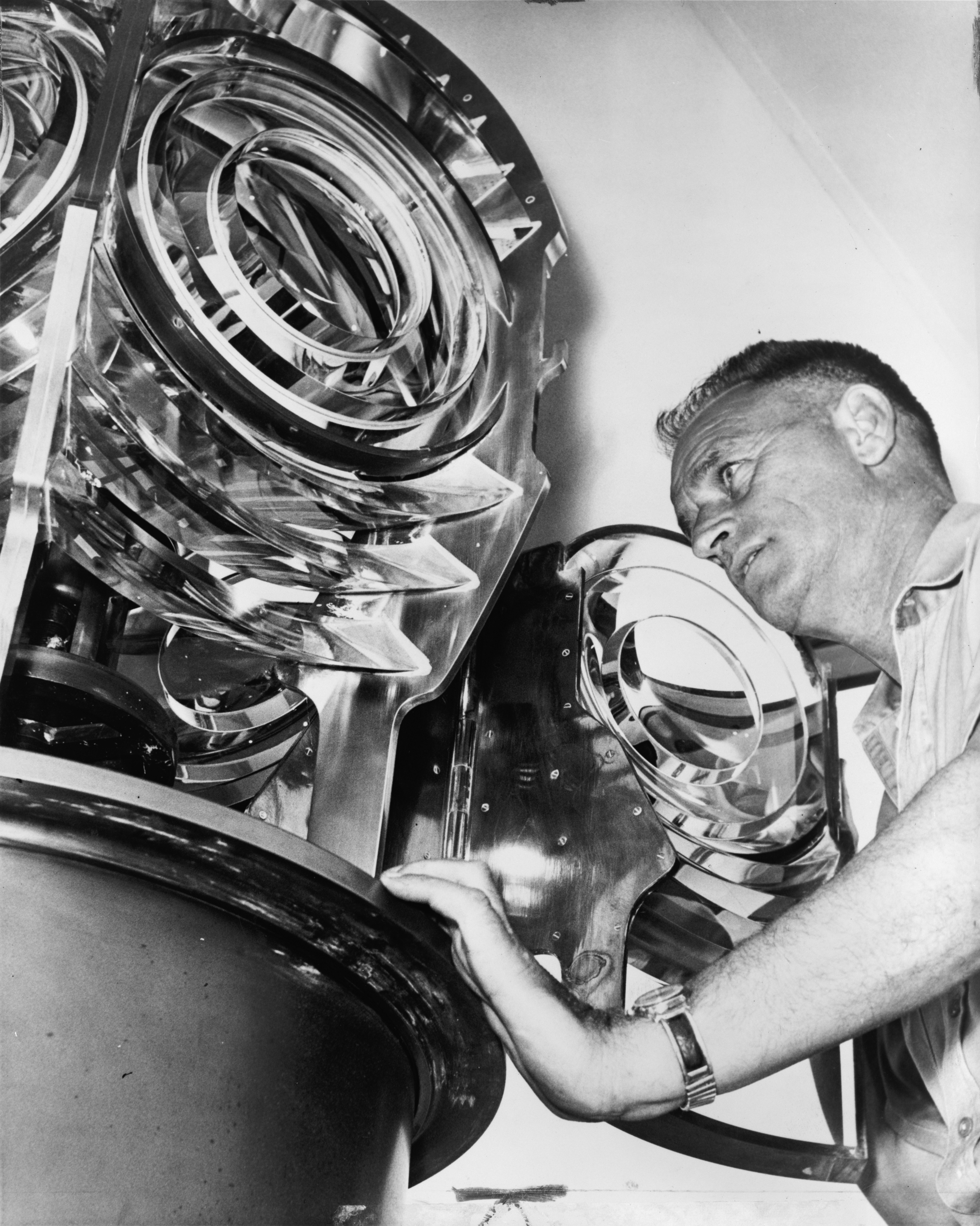
Frank Schubert with the lens of the Coney Island Light in 1961

Frank Schubert (1915–2003) was the lighthouse keeper of the Coney Island Light for over 40 years. He was among the last civilian lighthouse keepers in the United States.

Schubert began working for the United States Coast Guard in 1939. At the time of his death he was serving at the Coney Island Light in Sea Gate, Brooklyn, New York, where he had worked since 1960. He maintained the grounds and fog signal, and was credited with saving 15 lives. Schubert remained at the lighthouse after it was automated in the 1980s, and was visited by many lighthouse buffs.

He died on December 11, 2003, aged 88.
