= Harry H. Wachtel =

American lawyer

- Harry Wachtel and Martin Luther King Jr.
- Born: March 26, 1917; New York City, United States
- Died: February 3, 1997 (aged 79); Roslyn Heights, New York
- Education: Columbia University
- Occupations: Businessman, lawyer
- Known for: Research Committee, Civil Rights Movement

Harry Howard Wachtel (26 March 1917 – 3 February 1997) was an American lawyer and businessman who worked closely with Martin Luther King Jr., Clarence Benjamin Jones, and others within the Civil Rights Movement. Wachtel founded the Research Committee, an influential group within King's inner circle that advised King on political and social issues, and helped provide King and the movement with legal and financial connections.

== Early and personal life ==
Wachtel was born in New York City on 26 March 1917. He was active as a student radical in the 1930s, and received his law degree from Columbia University in 1940. Wachtel served in the US Army in Europe during World War II. After the war and for the duration of his life, Wachtel would practice law in New York, representing the McCrory Corporation, the Rapid American Corporation, and the Lerner Stores Corporation. In 1940 he married Leonora (Lucy) Golden Wachtel; the couple had three children: Alan, William and Susan Wachtel.

== Contact with the Civil Rights Movement ==
Wachtel came into contact with the inner circle of the Civil Rights Movement after being contacted by lawyer, activist and King confidant Clarence Jones, in 1961. Jones requested that Wachtel work to desegregate the operations of the lunch counter service Wachtel represented, a part of the McCrory Corporation. Wachtel offered his legal services to King personally, and after correspondence, the two met in 1962.

Wachtel was an important contact for King because of his connections beyond the leftist and labor movements, and over a wide geographic area. Wachtel was acquainted with Washington DC lawyer Abe Fortas, whom Lyndon Johnson would name to the US Supreme Court. These contacts allowed King access to contacts and donors at high levels of Wall Street, law and politics throughout the United States.

== Gandhi Society and Research Committee ==
In 1962, with King's support, Wachtel established the Gandhi Society, to provide legal and financial support for the Civil Rights Movement. Notwithstanding that Wachtel established the Gandhi Society, he was not committed to nonviolence let alone a pacifist. Wachtel was aided by Jones and by New York Civil Rights attorneys Stanley Levison, Theodore W. Kheel and William Kunstler. The society was a nonprofit and important funding source for King's efforts.

In 1963, Wachtel and Jones defended Ralph Abernathy and other Civil Rights ministers from the charge of libel in New York Times Co. v. Sullivan(Wachtel & Michaelson did not represent the New York Times; the law firm represented four SCLC reverends in Abernathy et al. v. Sullivan, the underlying case that was joined with NYT v. Sullivan], and Wachtel quickly became a part of King's inner circle. Wachtel recruited William P. Rogers, who had been Eisenhower's second attorney general, to make oral arguments before the Supreme Court on King's behalf. Wachtel encouraged King's legal team to prepare an aggressive and vigorous defense, arguing that the more timid defense undertaken by Wachtel's former legal professor, Herbert Wechsler, provided the court multiple avenues to rule against King's associates and the New York Times.

Among King's close associates, Wachtel was often humorously compared to Levison, another Jewish lawyer from New York City who played a major role in the Civil Rights Movement. Wachtel formed an advisory group for King called the Research Committee, which included Jones, union activist Ralph Helstein, labor organizer Cleveland Robinson, historian Lawrence D. Reddick, and civil rights activist and socialist Bayard Rustin who placed the offending advertisement in the New York Times on behalf of but without the knowledge of the SCLC reverends who would ultimately become the defendants in the underlying suit; the civil rights issues in that suit were never addressed. Wachtel felt that King's connections and political knowledge were lacking, and used the Research Committee, which met every 2–3 weeks in New York, to strengthen King's command of policy and world affairs.

The FBI attempted and failed to acquire information on the committee's first meeting in Wachtel's law offices, hoping to spend $50 to bribe someone with office access to help install bugging equipment. In the committee, Wachtel particularly admired Rustin, whom he defended when Rustin came under attack because of his leftwing connections. After political divisions within King's inner circle — exacerbated by the FBI — led King to distance himself from Levison, in 1965 Wachtel helped the two reconcile.

The committee would influence King's political positions and speeches for many years.

== Civil Rights struggles ==
In 1964 Wachtel and his wife accompanied the Kings to Oslo, Norway when King was awarded the Nobel Peace Prize. The prize increased FBI director J. Edgar Hoover's animus towards King, who told Wachtel of his fears that Hoover would expose his sexual affairs to the public. Wachtel supported King in his antipoverty offensive, along with Jones sending King statistics on poverty, and recommending that King broaden his campaign to include many poor, rural whites.

In the face of opposition from governor Wallace and the police, Wachtel helped King plan the 1965 Selma to Montgomery marches. Following clashes in Selma, he was instrumental in helping to arrange meetings between King and the Vice President and President, Hubert Humphrey and Lyndon B. Johnson, in 1965–66. At King's arrest, Wachtel and Jones placed a full-page advertisement in the New York Times titled "Letter from the Selma Jail," in which King wrote,

This is Selma, Alabama. There are more negroes in jail with me than there are on the voting rolls.

— Martin Luther King Jr., "Letter from the Selma Jail", Judgment Days (2006)

Wachtel and Jones were unaware that King had been released from prison by the time the letter appeared, and that King was therefore open to public criticism. To address this dilemma, Wachtel and Jones announced that King had been released from prison in order to meet with President Johnson at the White House, taking Johnson by surprise. Using his White House contact Lee White as an intermediary, Wachtel desperately tried to organize the meeting, while Johnson was furious at what he regarded as King's self-invitation. The FBI, who were wiretapping Jones, attempted to disrupt the meeting by identifying Wachtel as a Communist Party member to the President. Like Levinson, Wachtel had been a member of the Communist Party of the United States of America. Johnson, under powerful pressure to enact Civil Rights reforms, announced that he would recommend that Congress pass a voting rights act, and that Vice President Humphrey and Attorney General Katzenbach would meet with King. Through White, Johnson informed Wachtel that if King maintained total secrecy, Johnson would meet with King during his meetings with Humphrey and Katzenbach.

Wachtel handled King's estate after his assassination, became Coretta Scott King's personal lawyer, and helped her negotiate a book contract to publish remembrances of her husband. He served as vice president and legal counsel for the Martin Luther King Jr. Center for Nonviolent Social Change from 1969 until 1982. At different times he served as vice president for the American Foundation for Nonviolence, and as a trustee for the Southern Christian Leadership Conference.

== FBI surveillance ==
As a result of his Civil Rights work, Wachtel was targeted by the FBI, thereby being subjected to break-ins and document collections. In preparation for the 1964 eighth annual SCLC conference in Savannah, the FBI increased its surveillance of Wachtel, noting that he was reported to have been, in 1949, "an active member of the National Lawyers['] Guild," a left wing organization, and that his wife, according to one claim, "was listed as an officer of the Bath Beach Club of the King County Communist Party in 1944." Wachtel was an active member of the National Lawyers Guild. Learning from surveillance of Wachtel that New York governor Nelson Rockefeller planned to donate $250,000 to King's cause, Hoover requested that a police and FBI contact close to Rockefeller brief him on King's FBI files.

== Later life and death ==
Towards the end of his life, Wachtel remained a legal specialist in domestic and international business and litigation. In 1984, Wachtel founded the law firm Gold and Wachtel.

Wachtel became ill with Parkinson's disease and died at his home in Roslyn Heights, Long Island on February 3, 1997.

== Harry Wachtel papers ==
Harry Wachtel's papers were donated by his wife Lucy Wachtel and Hofstra University trustee Bernard Fixler to the Hofstra University Archives. The papers include 15 cubic feet of papers, 12 cubic feet of printed documents, and are arranged into 17 series.
