= Senft =

Senft is a German surname. Notable people with the surname include:

- Adam Senft, protagonist of Dark Hollow
- David Senft, member of the American band Darlingside
- Didi Senft (born 1952), German cycling celebrity
- Frederick Senft, founder of the Altoona Alliance Church
- Gabrielle Senft (born 1997), Canadian rugby union player
- Haro Senft (1928–2016), German filmmaker
- Jim Senft, founder of the Canadian theatre company Summerstock Conservatory
- Lauren Senft (born 1987), Canadian ice dancer
- Maximilian Senft (born 1989), Austrian football manager, former footballer, and former poker player
- Michael Senft (born 1972), German canoeist
- Riley Senft (born 1979), Canadian activist
- Simon Senft (born 1982), German fencer
