= Agudath Israel Etz Ahayem =

Orthodox synagogue

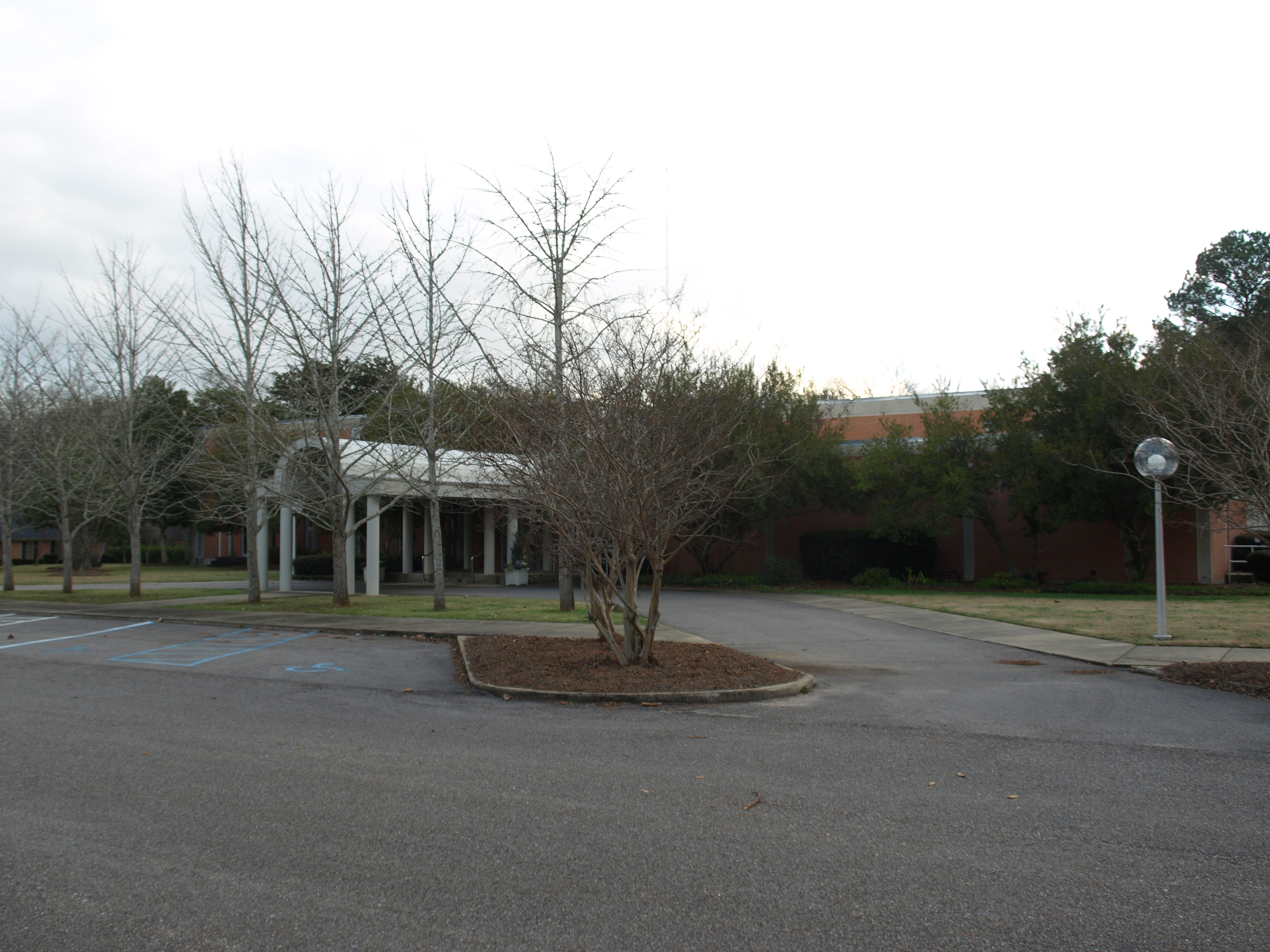

- Location in Alabama

Religion
- Affiliation: Conservative Judaism
- Ecclesiastical or organisational status: Synagogue
- Leadership: Rabbi Scott Kramer; President Joy Blondheim
- Status: Active

Location
- Location: 3525 Cloverdale Road, Montgomery, Alabama
- Country: United States
- Coordinates: 32°20′26″N 86°17′32″W

Architecture
- Completed: 1957; 69 years ago

Website
- aieamontgomery.org

Agudath Israel Etz Ahayem, transliterated from Hebrew to mean the Congregation of Israel Tree of Life, is a Conservative Jewish synagogue located at 3525 Cloverdale Road in Montgomery, Alabama, in the United States.

The synagogue was formed through the 2001 merger of Agudath Israel and Etz Ahayem synagogues.

== Historical summary ==
Agudath Israel was established as an Orthodox synagogue in 1902 by Yiddish speaking Ashkenazi Jews, recent Eastern European immigrants who rejected the Reform practices of Montgomery's established Congregation Kahl Montgomery/Temple Beth Or. After renting quarters for a number of years, the congregation purchased its first permanent building on Monroe Street in 1914, and constructed a new building at McDonough and High Street in 1928.

Agudath Israel came to national attention in 1955 because of the civil rights movement activism of then-rabbi Seymour Atlas, who eventually left the synagogue as a result of it. In 1957 it constructed its current building on Cloverdale Road, and joined the United Synagogue of Conservative Judaism, though it subsequently hired several Orthodox rabbis. Cynthia Culpeper became Agudath Israel's rabbi in 1995, but left in 1997 to seek treatment for AIDS, the result of an accidental needle prick while working as a nurse. She was the first pulpit rabbi to announce being diagnosed with AIDS, which she did in 1996 when she was rabbi of Agudath Israel.

Etz Ahayem was established in 1912 by Ladino speaking Sephardi Jews, particularly from Rhodes. The congregation grew slowly, and completed construction of its first building in 1927. In 1962 the congregation moved to a new building, but by the 1990s it had dwindled, as children of congregants moved away from Montgomery, and the synagogue had difficulty finding rabbis to lead it.

The congregations merged in 2001, and adopted the current name. In 2007 Scott Kramer became Agudath Israel Etz Ahayem's third rabbi since the merger. As of 2015, Kramer was the rabbi and Joy Blondheim was the president.

== Agudath Israel ==
=== Early history ===
Ashkenazi Jews immigrated to Montgomery from Russia, Poland, Romania, and Ukrainian Galicia in the late 19th century. Agudath Israel was established in 1902 by 16 of them, former members of Montgomery's oldest synagogue, Temple Beth Or. Though originally organized as the Orthodox Congregation Kahl Montgomery by German Jews in 1849, during the 1870s Kahl Montgomery had steadily adopted Reform practices. It changed its name to Temple Beth Or in 1874, and officially joined the Reform movement in 1879. The more recent Eastern European immigrant members wanted a service in Hebrew that followed Orthodox practice, and decided to organize their own synagogue.

The congregation's first president was Max Shuwolf, a Hungarian Jew who had first immigrated to Galveston, Texas, then ran a small dry goods store in Montgomery. He donated two rooms in his house, where the new congregation held its first services. The congregation's first constitution was written in Yiddish. Services were held in Hebrew and Yiddish, men and women sat separately, and men covered their heads, as mandated by the constitution.

Over the next few years the congregation grew, and moved to a number of rented locations, including "rented office space above the National Shirt Company on Court Square and an annex of the First National Bank". By 1907, the synagogue had 30 members, and an annual revenue of $500 (today $17,300); that year Temple Beth Or had 188 members and revenues of $9,500 (today $328,000). Reflecting the membership's "growing assimilation", in 1914 Agudath Israel re-wrote its constitution in English. That same year the congregation dedicated its first permanent building, on Monroe Street, and hired its first full-time rabbi. The State of Alabama purchased the building on Monroe in 1927, and the congregation built a new synagogue on land at McDonough and High Street, a handsome, brick Rundbogenstil building, notable for its hexagonal shape, which they dedicated in 1928. At the time Agudath Israel had 65 member families.

Morris Casriel Katz, a native of Felosveresmart, Czechoslovakia (now Velika Kopana, Ukraine) was rabbi from 1923 to 1926, his first pulpit before moving to Agudath Achim of Shreveport, Louisiana. Alexander Sandor Wiesel, a Chicago native, was rabbi in 1934. He had previously served at Brith Achim Synagogue in Petersburg, Virginia, and would move to House of Israel Synagogue in Calgary, Alberta. Benjamin G. Eisenberg served as rabbi from 1938 until at least 1942. By then membership had dropped to around 60 member families.

=== Seymour Atlas era ===
Agudath Israel came to national attention in the wake of the Montgomery bus boycott of 1955. At that time, then-rabbi Seymour Atlas had been serving as Agudath Israel's rabbi for almost ten years. A southerner (from Greenville, Mississippi), he was "in the 8th generation of a line of rabbis", and had become friends with Martin Luther King Jr., tutoring him in Hebrew, and speaking at his Dexter Avenue Church. As a result of his friendship with King, Atlas became involved in the Civil rights movement, and became known for his liberal sermons, and for frequently appearing on local television and radio stations with King, where he would discuss civil rights and issues including desegregation and the boycott.

In 1956, during National Brotherhood Week Atlas spoke on a panel of clergy at the local WRMA radio station, which also included Michael Caswell, a white Roman Catholic priest from nearby Gunter Air Force Base, Roy Bennett, a black Baptist minister, and black activist Ralph Abernathy; Bennett and Abernathy were subsequently arrested "on an obscure conspiracy charge". A picture of Atlas, Bennett, and Abernathy appeared in Life magazine in an article about the boycott, and the leadership of Agudath Israel grew concerned that Atlas's activism would lead to an antisemitic backlash. The trustees called an emergency meeting, and sent then congregational president Yale Friedlander to demand Atlas recant his support of the boycott, ask Life to withdraw the article, and agree to submit all public speeches to the board in advance for pre-approval. Atlas refused, and insisted that his participation in Brotherhood Week was not an endorsement of the boycott. However, Atlas wrote a sermon for the following Shabbat which included a prayer for the participants of the boycott. The sermon, as with all others, was to be printed beforehand in the Montgomery Advertiser, and a typesetter there called one of the synagogue's trustees to inform him of the contents. The trustee asked Atlas to modify the sermon, but he refused.

The trustees then ordered Atlas to stop inviting black clergymen to his weekly Hebrew class, "make no further speeches or statements outside the synagogue", and, as long has he was rabbi there, "disassociate [himself] from the Negroes completely". Atlas again refused, and the trustees responded by shunning him, refusing to visit his home, and literally turning their backs on him when he was around.

When his contract came up for renewal that year, Atlas argued that the matter should be put to a congregational vote. The trustees refused to do so, and voted 27 to 1 not to renew the contract. After Atlas left, the trustees unanimously voted that the next rabbi would have to sign an agreement not to discuss "Negroes" or segregation.

=== Post Atlas to 2000 ===
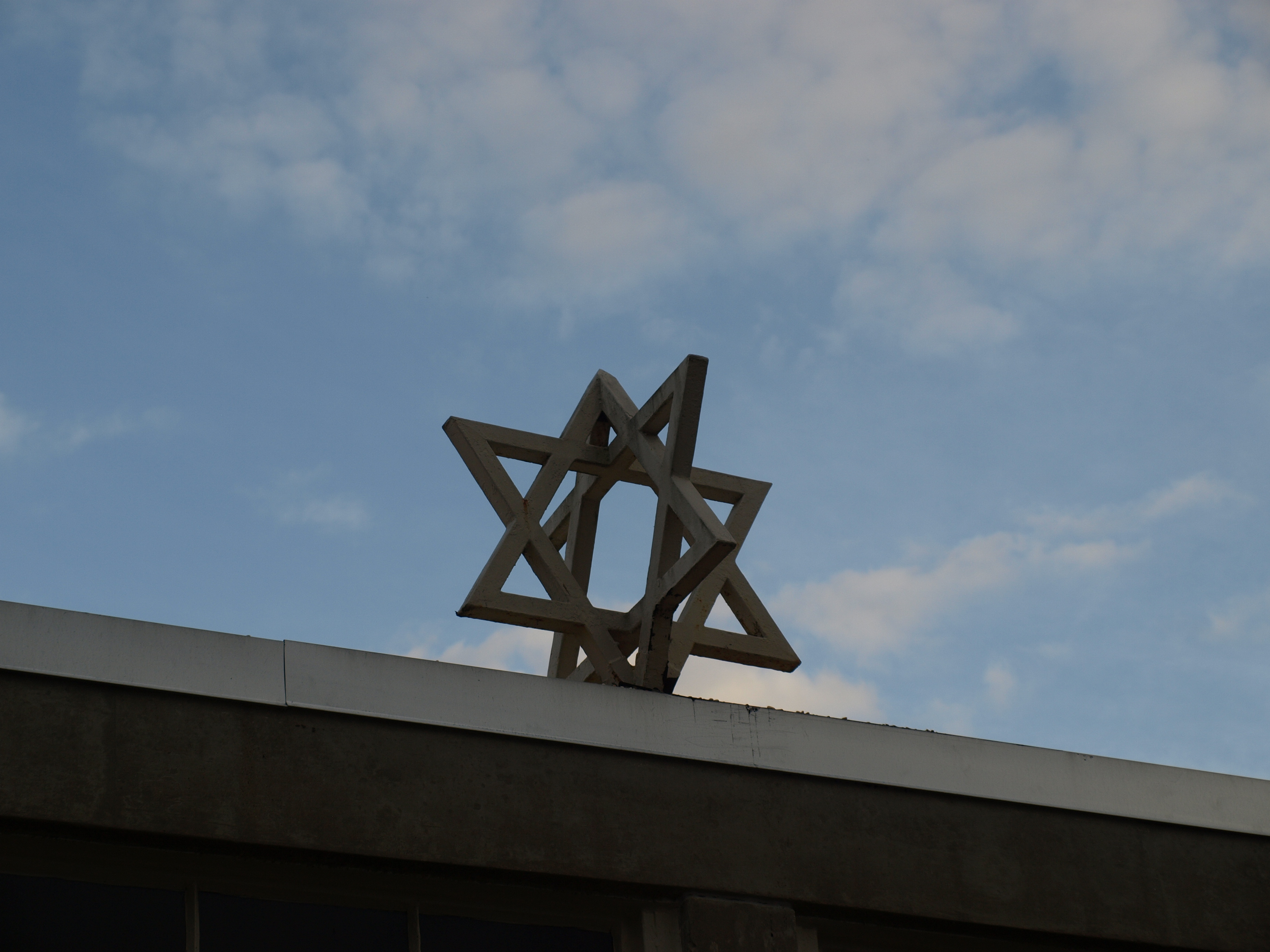
A Star of David at Agudath Israel Etz Ahayem

During the 1950s the synagogue had been "traditional" (Conservadox), rather than strictly Orthodox; for example, the Monroe Street building had seating for men on the left, seating for women on the right, and mixed seating in the middle. Following Atlas's departure, the congregation formally moved from Orthodox Judaism to Conservative, hiring a Conservative rabbi, Joseph Reich, and, in 1957, moved to its current location at 3525 Cloverdale Road. In 1959, however, it hired as rabbi Aaron Borow, who had just graduated from the Modern Orthodox Yeshiva University. While Borow did not undo the synagogue's mixed seating, he did turn off the synagogue's microphone, and turn the bimah so that the cantor faced the front of the synagogue (rather than the congregation), in the Orthodox style. In November 1964, Borow was hired as rabbi of the Orthodox Nusach Hari B’nai Zion Congregation of St. Louis, Missouri, where he served until his retirement in 1999.

Borow was succeeded by Irving Rubin, also a graduate of Yeshiva University, who served from 1965 to 1968, before moving to Kesher Israel Synagogue in West Chester, Pennsylvania. Raphael Gold was rabbi from the mid-1970s to the early 1980s. David Arzouane, another a graduate of Yeshiva University, joined Agudath Israel in 1986 as director of the Hebrew education program, a position he has held since then. Upon receiving his ordination from the Conservative Jewish Theological Seminary of America (JTSA) in 1988, Aaron Krupnick joined Agudath Israel as rabbi. He served until 1994.

Agudath Israel hired Cynthia Culpeper as rabbi in 1995. Culpeper, a convert from Catholicism and former nurse, had been posted at Agudath Israel as a rabbinical intern, and was hired there full-time upon graduation from the JTSA, the first Conservative woman rabbi in Alabama. However, the following year she revealed that she had AIDS, the result of an accidental needle prick while working as a nurse. She was the first pulpit rabbi to announce being diagnosed with AIDS, which she did early in 1996. The congregation rallied around her, insisting she continue to work, and wearing red AIDS awareness ribbons, but in 1997 she gave up her position and moved to Birmingham, Alabama, where she could get "cutting edge" treatment at the University of Alabama at Birmingham's AIDS research clinic. Culpeper died in 2005.

Shalom Plotkin joined Agudath Israel as rabbi in 2000. A graduate of the University of Maryland, and ordained by the JTSA in 1998, he had been an "assistant rabbi at a synagogue in Marietta, Georgia" before coming to Agudath Israel. A chaplain in the United States Navy Reserve, he had been stationed with the U.S. Navy in the Adriatic Sea in 1995, during the Bosnian War. During his tenure at Agudath Israel, he remained in the reserve.

=== Notable members ===
Aaron Aronov, former president of Agudath Israel, was inducted into the Alabama Academy of Honor in 1988. Former Secretary of State, Attorney General, Lieutenant Governor and Governor of Alabama Don Siegelman and his family were also members of Agudath Israel. Though Siegelman is Catholic, his wife Lori—who grew up in Birmingham, Alabama—and two children are Jewish. His daughter Dana celebrated her Bat Mitzvah at the synagogue in February 1998.

== Etz Ahayem ==
Ralph Nace Cohen, a Sephardi Jew from Rhodes, settled in Montgomery in 1906, sponsored by a Greek Orthodox friend. Other Sephardi Jews followed, first from Rhodes, and then from the rest of Greece and Turkey. By 1908 this small community celebrated held its first High Holiday services in the Orthodox Community Center, space which was rented by Agudath Israel. In 1912, they named themselves Congregation Etz Ahayem ("Tree of Life"), writing a constitution in Ladino. Temple Beth Or gave them a Torah scroll, and in 1916 they formally incorporated. The congregation bought a house at 450 Sayre Street in 1918, but it was not until 1927 that they completed construction of a building there. At the time the congregation comprised 27 families.

During the German occupation of Greece almost all the Jews of Rhodes were sent to the Auschwitz concentration camp; as a result, most members of Etz Ahayem had close family members who were killed in the Holocaust. Before the occupation, however, members of the Kal Grande congregation in Rhodes had buried their Torah scrolls. After the war the scrolls were retrieved and sent to Israel, and a Dr. Nace Cohen was able to procure one of them for Etz Ahayem.

During the 1950s Etz Ahayem added a great deal of English to its prayer services, which had formerly been conducted solely in Ladino and Hebrew. During the Montgomery bus boycott, then rabbi Solomon Acrish spoke in favor of the boycott and against segregation, "citing the demand in Torah for social justice". However, after being followed, and told by gentile friends he could no longer come for dinner, and after Etz Ahayem received a bomb threat, he "toned down his support for desegregation".

In 1962, the congregation moved to a new building, but the children of the congregation generally moved away from Montgomery. By the 1990s the congregation dwindled, and had difficulty finding Sephardi rabbis, relying instead on "lay leaders and the occasional rabbinic services from nearby Maxwell Airforce Base". In 2001 Maxwell Air Force Base ended its rabbinic services, and the congregation was down to 22 member families. The board of directors decided to accept an offer from Agudath Israel to enter into merger negotiations.

== Agudath Israel Etz Ahayem ==
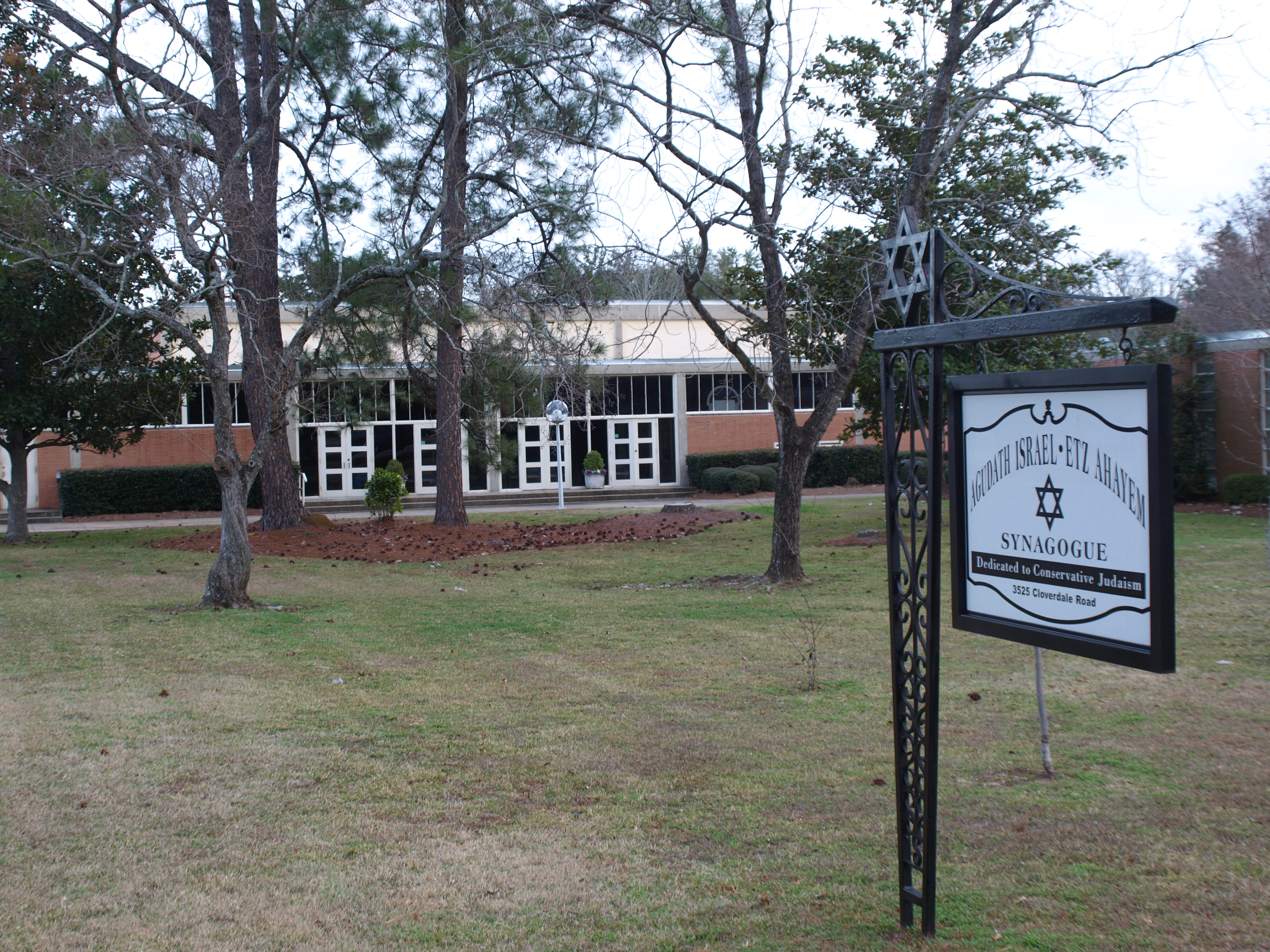
The sign of Agudath Israel Etz Ahayem

Agudath Israel and Etz Ahayem merged in 2001. Agudath Israel's Rabbi Plotkin oversaw the merger, and became the rabbi of the merged congregation, Agudath Israel Etz Ahayem. Along with the new name, the synagogues combined traditions, and Ashkenazi and Sephardi rituals. Plotkin moved to Albuquerque's Congregation B'nai Israel in May 2002.

From 2002 to 2006 Stephen Listfield was the rabbi; for the previous eight years he had been the rabbi of Congregation Beth Shalom in Pompton Lakes, New Jersey. Listfield led protests by the congregation against the posthumous induction into the Alabama Military Hall of Honor of prominent United States Navy officer, frequent political candidate, and outspoken antisemite John G. Crommelin. Listfield moved to Pittsburgh's Tree of Life Congregation in August 2006.

In 2007, Scott Kramer became the congregation's rabbi, his first rabbinic post. A native of Baltimore, Kramer had a Master's degree in physics from the University of Utah, and for over two decades had worked as a software engineer. He began studying at the Ziegler School of Rabbinic Studies at the American Jewish University in 2002, and was ordained there in 2007. As of 2015, Kramer was Agudath Israel Etz Ahayem's rabbi and Joy Blondheim was the president.
