= Beit Warszawa Synagogue =

Reform synagogue in Warsaw, Poland

- Polish: Synagoga „Beit Warszawa”
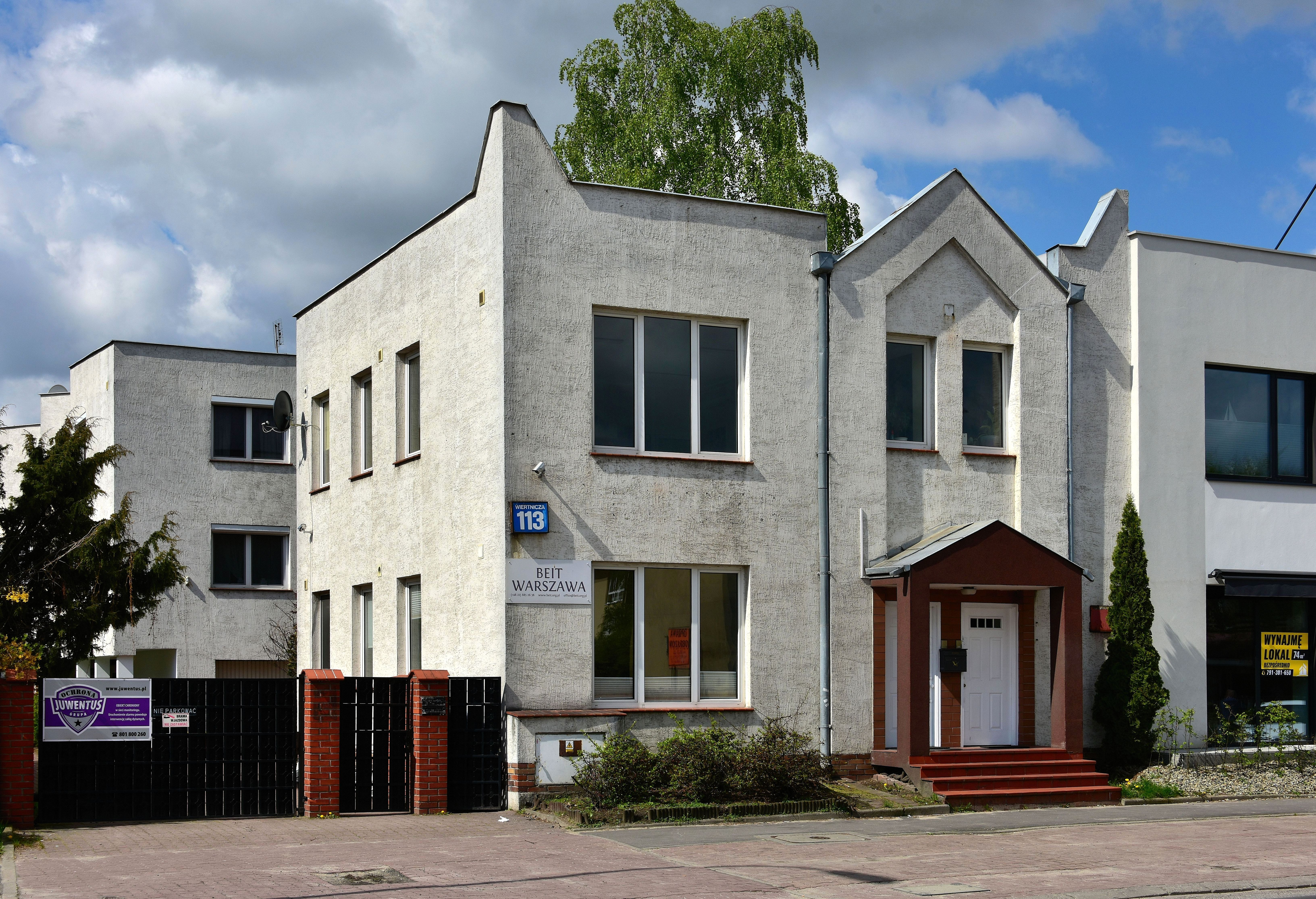
- The synagogue in 2017

- Location of the synagogue in Masovian Voivodeship

Religion
- Affiliation: Reform Judaism
- Ecclesiastical or organizational status: Synagogue
- Ownership: Beit Warszawa Jewish Cultural Association (Polish: Towarzystwo Kultury Żydowskiej Beit Warszawa)
- Governing body: World Union for Progressive Judaism
- Leadership: Rabbi Gil Nativ
- Status: Active

Location
- Location: 113 Wiertnicza Street, Wilanów, Warsaw, Masovian Voivodeship
- Country: Poland
- Interactive map of Beit Warszawa Synagogue
- Coordinates: 52°10′31″N 21°04′37″E

Architecture
- Type: Synagogue architecture
- Style: Modernist
- Established: 1999 (as a congregation)
- Completed: 2003
- Materials: Brick

Website
- beit.org.pl

The Beit Warszawa Synagogue (Polish: Synagoga „Beit Warszawa”) is a Reform Jewish congregation and synagogue, located at 113 Wiertnicza Street, in the district of Wilanów, Warsaw, in the Masovian Voivodeship of Poland. Designed in the Modernist style and completed in 2003, the synagogue has regular events, including Friday night and Saturday morning prayers. Beit Warszawa is a member of Beit Polska, the umbrella organization for the Progressive and Reform Jewish community in Poland.

== History ==
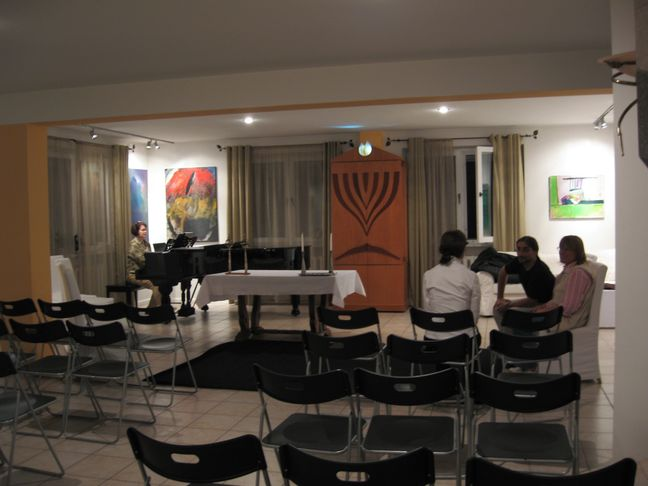
Interior, in 2006

=== Leadership ===
Beit Warszawa started in 1999 when Jonathan Mills and others individuals gathered a group of friends to explore the possibility of creating a Reform synagogue. Previously, the only choice had been the Orthodox Nożyk Synagogue in the centre of Warsaw. Initially, Oneg Shabbat were held once a month in the house of one of the congregants. However, as time passed and the community grew, Shabbat started to be held every Friday night. Increasingly various events were held during the week as well.

In 2000 Cynthia Culpeper became the first female rabbi to lead religious services in Poland when she conducted High Holy Day services at Beit Warszawa.

The congregation moved from a rented flat into dedicated premises at ul. Wiertnicza in Warsaw in 2003. A series of rabbis visited Beit Warszawa but the first distinctive and ongoing presence was that of Rabbi Burt Schuman from 2006 to 2011.

In June 2012, Beit Warszawa announced the appointment of Rabbi Gil Nativ as rabbi. Nativ was previously in Cincinnati, Los Angeles, and Israel. After a long illness, Schuman resigned. Rabbi Daniel Alter served on an interim basis during the initial period of Schuman’s illness. During Autumn 2011 and Spring 2012, Rabbis Reich, Bruce Kadden, and Beliak filled in. Barbara Kadden was an influential presence during the months that the couple visited Warsaw.

=== Attendance ===
Beit Warszawa Synagogue has an attendance of around forty to eighty people on most Friday nights. Attendance on Saturday mornings is well above the minyan. On occasions such as Passover or Rosh Hashana, the synagogue is full. There are regular courses in Hebrew and Judaism as well as cultural events such as lectures and films. The people who belong to this synagogue are often people of Jewish descent who were raised as Christians and did not know that they were Jewish, as well as American Jews living in or visiting Poland and growing numbers of Israelis with Polish roots. Increasingly the five medical schools teaching in English at Polish universities have attracted Jewish students, who have attend services at Beit Warszawa. There are also converts without known “Jewish roots” and Israeli families who have joined the community.

=== Youth activities ===
Sunday School, Day Camp and Summer Camp, the youth of Polish Jewry have a growing system of formal and informal education. During the summer there is a day camp that celebrates Jewish holidays especially the weekly Shabbat with the baking of Hallah. Naturally, there are the visits to the swimming pools and museums. This summer, the youth movements of Progressive Judaism in Poland and Germany, Beit Polska and Netzer, joined for a two-week overnight camp. This was the first meeting of Jewish young people from the Reform movement since 1927.

=== Lay cantors ===
Under the leadership of Rabbi Burt Schuman and Mimi Sheffer, a lay cantors' program was established in Fall 2010. The program produced talented Polish-speaking prayer leaders in a unique course. Great effort was invested in translating into Polish key essays concerning Jewish prayer and prayer leadership. The curriculum and training of this course will prepare a new generation of prayer leaders; some of its members are pursuing further Jewish education. The contributions of Rabbi Bruce Kadden and Barbara Kadden in this effort were crucial in providing a basis for the curriculum. In its first year, the program graduated six leaders who are competent to lead Shabbat services. Four members of that class are studying to become High Holiday and Festival, service leaders. The second class has eight members and will graduate in October 2012. Graduates of the lay cantors' program include Rabbi Gosia Korwdowicz (JTS 2018), Cantor Anna Silverman (JTS Davidson Cantorial School 2019), Anna Rivero, Dr. Menachem Mirski (fourth-year student, Zeigler School of American Jewish University), Miriam Klimowa (third-year rabbinic student at Hebrew Union College-Jerusalem campus), Henryk Kowalski (Warsaw), Rivka Foremniak (Warsaw), and Alina Antoszewska (Warsaw). Currently on three Cantorial soloist remain active in leading on a regular basis in Poland - Kowalski, Foremniak, and Antoszewska.

Monthly services are held in communities throughout Poland sponsored by Beit Polska and led by graduates of the lay cantors’ program.

=== Beit Polska Siddur ===
Under the leadership of Rabbi Burt Schuman a siddur, which addressed modern Jews in Polish, their native language, together with a transliteration of Hebrew was completed. In May 2012 the “test drive” of this prayer book began. The plan calls for a year of experimentation and study that will lead to a definitive printing of the prayer book that will also contain passages of Jewish wisdom. In 2015 Sidur Beit Polin for weekdays, sabbaths, and festivals appeared. Rabbi Gil Nativ and Zivah Nativ were responsible for the Hebrew text. Marek Jezowski, Joanna Czopnik, Marzen Szymanska-Bltnicki and Joanna Auron-Gorska translated numerous readings from English and provided a clear and elegant Polish translation. The prayerbook while admitting much of the concerns of feminism and modern Progressive Judaism provided traditional options for all prayers. Contemporary poetry and a rich introductory essay by Rabbi Nativ placed the Siddur in its modern context. The extensive transliterations were controversial in some circles as was the retention of an abbreviated Musaf service.

=== Courses outside Warsaw ===
There are plans for Step by Step classes in six key cities outside of Warsaw. Step by Step is a popular and successful program that provides a path to learning and in many instances to conversion. Dozens of graduates of the Step by Step program are members of Beit Warszawa and other Jewish groups. The Beit Warszawa synagogue fostered the development of the umbrella organization called Beit Polska. Beit Polska is active in Gdansk, Lodz, Lublin, Wroclaw, Katowice, Czestochowa and other Polish cities.

== Recognition ==
Beit Polska Union of Progressive Jewish Congregations is recognized as a separate religious entity registered under number 171 of the Church Registry held by the Ministry of Interior. With the Polish Interior Ministry’s recognition the right of Progressive Jews to organize and pray in their own egalitarian fashion is formally recognized.

The decision of the Ministry was upheld in administrative courts despite challenges by the "Orthodox" establishment called “Twarda.” “Twarda” claimed that Polish law granted it a monopoly over all things Jewish. The recent interference of German and Russian trained rabbis only supports the strong suspicion of intolerance from “Twarda.” The attempt by "Twarda" to limit religious expression is being vigorously challenged by associations of Human Rights Lawyers and by Beit Polska.

Twarda’s hiring of one Reform Rabbi who is under the supervision of the Orthodox rabbi was met with skepticism in the entire Jewish world. The hiring of one Reform Rabbi after twenty years of fifteen or so Orthodox rabbis suggested not change, but a calculated attempt to pursue policies that served the Orthodox establishment and not the needs of Polish Jews. This has resulted in thousands of dollars expended on lawyers.

In an interview with Beit Polska’s Rabbi Haim Dov Beliak he stated that “unsuspecting American philanthropists have often given vast sums to this the pseudo-Orthodox establishment that prefers memorial projects over building Jewish Polish life.”

== See also ==
- Chronology of Jewish Polish history
- History of the Jews in Poland
- List of active synagogues in Poland
