= Georgia Davis Powers =

American politician

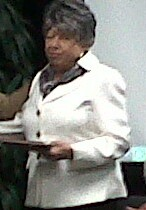
- Powers in 2010

Member of the Kentucky Senate from the 33rd district
- In office January 1, 1968 – January 1, 1989
- Preceded by: Bernard Bonn
- Succeeded by: Gerald Neal

Personal details
- Born: Georgia Montgomery; October 19, 1923 Springfield, Kentucky, U.S.
- Died: January 30, 2016 (aged 92) Louisville, Kentucky, U.S.
- Party: Democratic
- Spouses: Norman F. Davis (m. 1943–1968) James L. Powers (m. 1973)
- Children: William "Billy" Davis
- Parent(s): Frances Walker and Ben Gore Montgomery
- Occupation: Politician, civil rights activist

Georgia Davis Powers (née Montgomery; October 19, 1923 – January 30, 2016) was an American politician who served for 21 years as a state senator in the Kentucky Senate. In 1967, she was the first African American elected to the senate. During her term, she was "regarded as the leading advocate for blacks, women, children, the poor, and the handicapped," and was the chair of the Health and Welfare committee from 1970 to 1976 and the Labor and Industry committee from 1978 to 1988.

Powers attended the Louisville Municipal College, worked for organizations concerning civil and equal rights, and received honorary doctorates from the University of Kentucky and the University of Louisville, among other honors.

== Biography ==
Georgia Montgomery was born in Jimtown, Kentucky, a black settlement outside of Springfield, Kentucky, on October 19, 1923. Montgomery grew up in a family of nine children. She had eight brothers: Joseph Ben (Jay), Robert, John Albert, Phillip, Lawrence Franklin, James Isaac, Rudolph and Carl. Her parents, Frances Walker and Ben Gore Montgomery later moved the family to the state's largest metropolis, Louisville, as a result of a tornado destroying their two-room shack. As a young girl she attended Louisville's all-black schools, Virginia Avenue Elementary School and Madison Junior High School. She graduated from Central High School in 1940, and from 1940 to 1942 attended the Louisville Municipal College.

As a young wife and mother of an adopted son, William (known as Billy), Georgia and her husband Norman "Nicky" Davis joined the New Covenant Presbyterian Church in Louisville. A fellow church member, Verna Smith, encouraged Montgomery to take her first steps into Democratic Party politics by joining the U.S. Senatorial campaign staff of Wilson Wyatt.

Davis worked for the Allied Organization for Civil Rights in promoting statewide public accommodations and fair employment laws in the early 1960s.

Davis Powers was initiated as an honorary member of Sigma Gamma Rho sorority in 1993.

== Public office ==
Davis had a job as a bill clerk in the Kentucky House of Representatives in 1966 when she asked Rep. Lloyd Clapp, D-Wingo, to vote for the civil-rights bill proposed by Gov. Edward "Ned" Breathitt. Clapp replied that if he voted for the bill he wouldn't get re-elected, and Davis replied "Maybe you shouldn't get re-elected." He blew cigarette smoke in her face, and she concluded that she needed to have her own seat in the legislature. She won the Democratic primary over Dr. Charles E. Riggs, 1,296 to 1,117. In the general election, she defeated Republican Clinton Loeffler Jr., 10,548 to 6,778. She succeeded Bernard Bonn, who had moved out of the district. Elected to serve in the Kentucky Senate from January 1968 to January 1989, she sponsored bills prohibiting employment discrimination, sex and age discrimination, in addition to introducing statewide fair housing legislation. On June 15, 1972, she was one of 20 Democratic senators that voted for Kentucky to ratify the Equal Rights Amendment. She was a leader in the movement to change what many considered the racially insensitive wording of the Kentucky State Song, My Old Kentucky Home, in 1986. In the first few months of her term, she introduced and secured an open housing bill, the first in any southern state.

She also supported legislation to improve education for the physically and mentally disabled. She was a member of the Cities Committee, Elections and Constitutional Amendments Committee and the Rules Committee. She served as secretary of the Democratic caucus from 1968 to 1988. She chaired two legislative committees: Health and Welfare (1970–76) and Labor and Industry (1978–88). In an oral history interview by Betsy Brinson in 2000, Governor Breathitt remembered:

Georgia Davis Powers was a great leader and a strong supporter of Dr. King and represented his views in Kentucky very effectively. She was later a member of the Kentucky State Senate, a very influential member from Louisville, and I would consider her one of the real heroes of the Civil Rights Movement in this state; and one of the most effective civil rights leaders in this state... She was effective in the Senate and in politics through the art of persuasion. She did not antagonize people. She was very strong in her positions, but she has a wonderful personality and people liked her. And she would get votes very effectively for the causes she believed in. She just was a vote getter and a great lobbyist and persistent, but a wonderful warm personality. Everybody was crazy about her.

In her autobiography, I Shared the Dream: The Pride, Passion, and Politics of the First Black Woman Senator from Kentucky, Powers wrote that she had a personal relationship with Martin Luther King Jr. as a friend, trusted confidante, and lover. She also wrote that she was at the Lorraine Motel in Memphis when King was assassinated in 1968, although some of King's other associates questioned her account. In The Walls Came Tumbling Down: An Autobiography King's closest aide and best friend Ralph Abernathy, referred to her (not by name) when he detailed who King had spent the remainder of the night and early morning with in the Lorraine Motel before his death. Abernathy wrote also that "their relationship was a close one."

After she retired from her seat in the Kentucky Senate in 1988, Powers remained committed to the continuing fight for equal rights and human dignity. In 1990, she created the Friends of Nursing Home Residents (FONHRI) to organize faith-based volunteerism in the Louisville area to serve as visitors to the local nursing homes. She also incorporated in 1994 an organization called QUEST (Quality Education for All Students) to monitor the work of the Jefferson County school board to halt the return to segregated schools.

== Awards and honors ==
Powers was included in a national photographic exhibit that opened on February 8, 1989, at the Corcoran Gallery in Washington, D.C.: Portraits of Black Women Who Changed America. In 1989, Montgomery received an honorary doctor of laws degree from the University of Kentucky and an honorary doctorate of humane letters from the University of Louisville.

== Death ==
Powers died on January 30, 2016, at the home of one of her brothers in Louisville, after suffering from congestive heart failure for several years.

== Legacy ==
In 2010 the Kentucky Legislature, under House Joint Resolution 67, renamed the portion of I-264 that runs through the West End of Louisville from I-64 near the Indiana border to the junction with US 31W the Georgia Davis Powers Expressway. The University of Kentucky endowed a chair in the name of Senator Powers as part of UK's Center for Research on Violence Against Women.

== Bibliography ==
- Onyekwuluje, Anne B. (2011). Historical Influence: reading Georgia Powers as a grassroots civil rights leader in the rough business of Kentucky politics. Lanham, Md.: Lexington Books. ISBN 978-0-7391-5098-6.
- Powers, Georgia (1995). I Shared the Dream: The pride, passion, and politics of the first Black woman senator from Kentucky. Far Hills, N.J: New Horizon Press. ISBN 0-88282-127-X.
- Barbara Summers, ed. (1989). I Dream A World: Portraits of Black Women Who Changed America. New York, N.Y.: Stewart Tabori & Chang. pp. 74–75. ISBN 1-55670-092-X.
- Groob, Kathy (March 7, 2011). "Breaking Barriers: Kentucky's First Female African American Senator, Georgia Davis Powers". 9 Ways Blog. Gloria Feldt.
- "Georgia Davis Powers". Living the Story: The Civil Rights Movement in Kentucky. Kentucky Educational Television.
- Clifft, Candyce (November 6, 2010). "Georgia Davis Powers". Louisville Life, Program #503. Kentucky Educational Television.
- Georgia Davis Powers entries in History of Kentucky Women in the Civil Rights Era, University of Kentucky.
- "Review, I Shared the Dream: The Pride, Passion and Politics of the First Black Woman Senator from Kentucky". Publishers Weekly. January 2, 1995..
- "Review, I Shared the Dream: The Pride, Passion and Politics of the First Black Woman Senator from Kentucky". Kirkus Reviews. March 1, 1995..
- Clemons, Becca (December 2, 2010). "Sen. Georgia Powers donates papers to UK". Kentucky Kernel..
