= Georgia's 38th Senate district =

American legislative district

Georgia's 38th State Senate district
Senator
RaShaun Kemp; D–Atlanta
- Demographics: 28.22% White; 59.11% Black; 7.04% Hispanic; 2.16% Asian; 0.14% Native American; 0.02% Hawaiian/Pacific Islander; 0.51% Other; 3.61% Multiracial
- Population (2020) • Voting age: 192,309; 149,091

District 38 of the Georgia Senate is located in Metro Atlanta.

The district is contained entirely within Fulton County and includes parts of Atlanta, Fairburn, Palmetto, Sandy Springs, South Fulton, and Union City. In Atlanta, the district includes western Buckhead and the neighborhoods of Bankhead, Cascade Heights, Grove Park, and Southwest Atlanta.

The current senator is RaShaun Kemp, a Democrat from Atlanta first elected in 2024.

== District officeholders ==
Years	Senator, District 15	Counties in district
1963–1965	Leroy Johnson	
1965–1967	Leroy Johnson	
1967–1969	Leroy Johnson	
1969–1971	Leroy Johnson	
1971–1973	Leroy Johnson	
1973–1975	Leroy Johnson	
1975–1977	Horace Tate	
1977–1979	Horace Tate	
1979–1981	Horace Tate	
1979–1983	Horace Tate	
1979–1985	Horace Tate	
1979–1987	Horace Tate	
1979–1989	Horace Tate	
1989–1991	Horace Tate	
1991–1993	Horace Tate	
1993–1995	Ralph David Abernathy III	
1995–1997	Ralph David Abernathy III	
1997–1999	Ralph David Abernathy III	
1999–2001	Horacena Tate	
2001–2003	Horacena Tate	
2003–2005	Horacena Tate	
2005–2007	Horacena Tate	
2007–2009	Horacena Tate	
2009–2011	Horacena Tate	
2011–2013	Horacena Tate	
2013–2015	Horacena Tate	
2015–2017	Horacena Tate	
2017–2019	Horacena Tate	
2019–2021	Horacena Tate	
2021–2023	Horacena Tate	
2023–2025	Horacena Tate	
2025–	RaShaun Kemp	
