= Temple Beth Israel (Altoona, Pennsylvania) =

Reform Jewish synagogue in Altoona, Pennsylvania, US

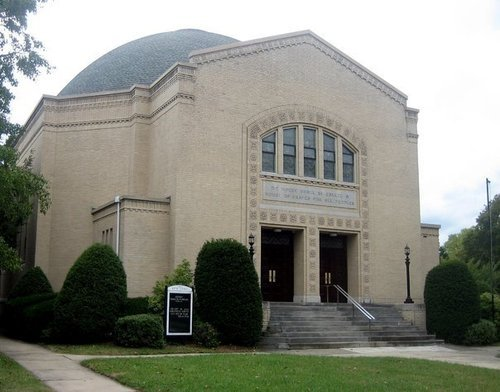
- Temple Beth Israel

- Location in Pennsylvania

Religion
- Affiliation: Reform Judaism
- Ecclesiastical or organizational status: Synagogue
- Leadership: Rabbi Audrey Korotkin
- Status: Active

Location
- Location: 3004 Union Avenue, Altoona, Pennsylvania
- Country: United States
- Interactive map of Temple Beth Israel
- Coordinates: 40°29′39″N 78°24′22″W

Architecture
- Architect: Morris W. Scheibel
- Type: Synagogue
- Style: Moorish Revival
- Established: 1874 (as a congregation)
- Completed: 1898 (13th Avenue); 1927 (Union Avenue)
- Dome: One

Website
- templebethisrael.net

Temple Beth Israel is a Reform synagogue located at 3004 Union Avenue, Altoona, Pennsylvania, in the United States.

== History ==
Founded in 1874 as the Orthodox Ahavath Achim (transliterated from Hebrew as "brotherly love"), the congregation moved to adopt Reform liturgy in 1877. In 1890 the congregation reorganized and was renamed Mountain City Hebrew Reformed Congregation. The congregation changed its name to Temple Beth Israel in 1922, and moved to its current location in 1924.

The congregation's earlier temple, designed by Charles Morrison Robinson in 1898, is now Holy Trinity Greek Orthodox Church, located at 1433 13th Avenue. The congregation's current building was designed by Morris W. Scheibel in 1927 in the Moorish Revival style.

Former rabbis include Nathan Kaber, Gary Klein, Richard Zionts, Burt Schuman (1995–2006), and Nicole Luna. From 2006 to 2010, Beth Israel was served by student rabbis or lay leaders. Audrey Korotkin joined as a part-time rabbi in 2010. She had previously served in three other synagogues.

With a membership of approximately 70 families, Temple Beth Israel serves the greater Altoona metropolitan area. In 2011, Temple Beth Israel also hosted the Altoona Alliance Church for all of its services and functions; the Church was in temporary quarters that were sold.
