= Ralph David Abernathy III =

American politician (1959–2016)

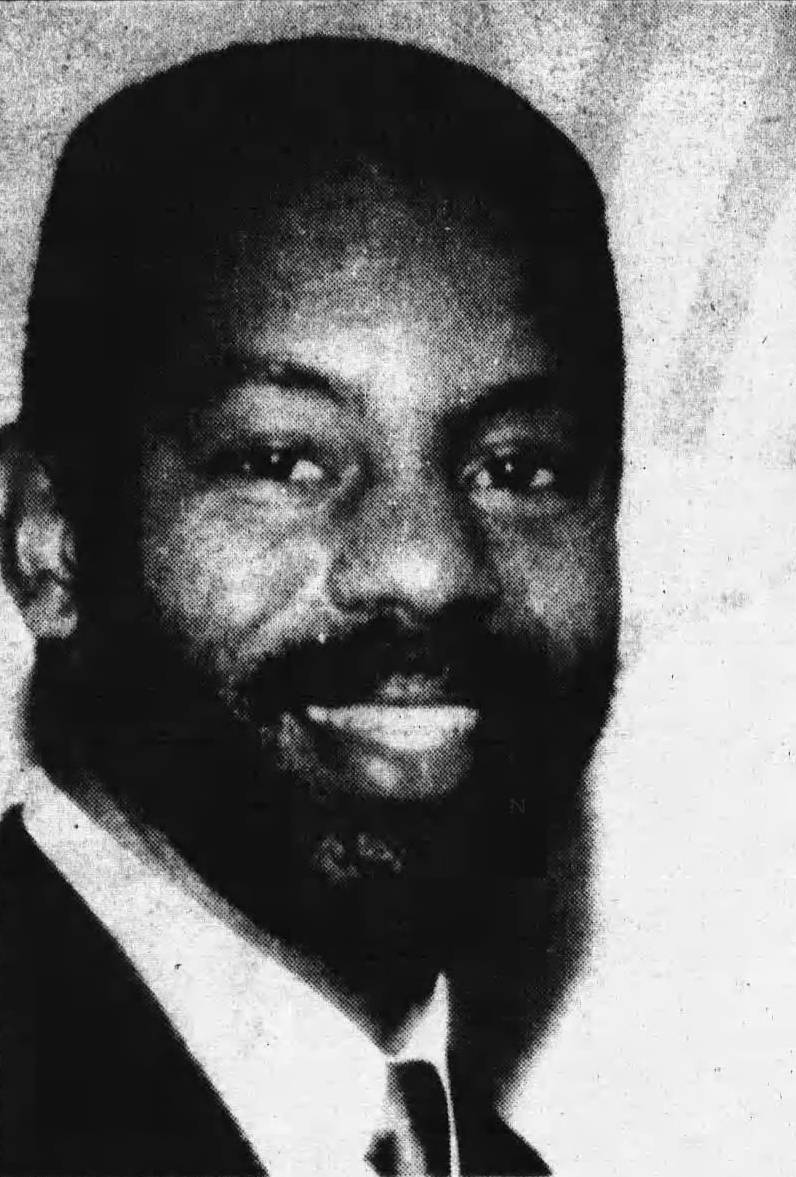
- Abernathy, c. 1988

Member of the Georgia State Senate from the 38th district
- In office January 11, 1993 – January 11, 1999
- Preceded by: Horace Tate
- Succeeded by: Horacena Tate

Member of the Georgia House of Representatives from the 39th district
- In office January 9, 1989 – January 11, 1993
- Preceded by: John W. Greer Jr.

Personal details
- Born: Ralph David Abernathy III; March 19, 1959 Montgomery, Alabama, U.S.
- Died: March 17, 2016 (aged 56) Atlanta, Georgia, U.S.
- Party: Democratic
- Relations: Donzaleigh Abernathy (sister)
- Parent(s): Ralph Abernathy; Juanita Abernathy

Ralph David Abernathy III (March 19, 1959 – March 17, 2016) was an American politician and businessman.

== Biography ==
Born on March 19, 1959, in Montgomery, Alabama, Abernathy was the son of civil rights activists Ralph and Juanita Abernathy. His sister was actress and author Donzaleigh Abernathy. He was named "III" after his older brother Ralph David Abernathy Jr., who died in infancy. He received his bachelor's degree in English and Linguistics from Morehouse College in 1981. He owned Clean Air Industries in Atlanta.

Abernathy served in the Georgia House of Representatives as a Democrat in 1988 and then in the Georgia State Senate in 1992. In 1997, Abernathy was indicted and convicted of smuggling marijuana into the United States from Jamaica, forgery, making a false statement, and witness tampering.

In 1999, Abernathy was convicted of defrauding the state of Georgia of thousands of dollars in expense money, numerous counts of theft, forgery and tampering with a witness. He was sentenced to four years in prison. Abernathy died in Atlanta, on March 17, 2016, aged 56, of cancer.
