= RaShaun Kemp =

American politician

Member of the Georgia State Senate from the 38th district
- Incumbent
- Assumed office January 13, 2025
- Preceded by: Horacena Tate

Personal details
- Party: Democratic

RaShaun Lamar Kemp is an American politician who was elected member of the Georgia State Senate for the 38th district in 2024.

Kemp is a former high school teacher and principal. Kemp and his husband have two children. He is not related to Georgia Governor Brian Kemp.
