= Cynthia Culpeper =

Cynthia Ann "Cyndie" Culpeper (June 16, 1962 – August 29, 2005) was the first pulpit rabbi to announce being diagnosed with AIDS, which she did in 1996 when she was a rabbi at Agudath Israel in Montgomery, Alabama. She was the first full-time female rabbi in Alabama and the first Conservative female rabbi in Alabama.

== Early life ==
Culpeper was originally from San Francisco. She converted from Roman Catholicism at age 21, and was ordained by the Jewish Theological Seminary in 1995.

== AIDS ==
Culpeper was working as a nurse in San Francisco General Hospital when she accidentally contracted HIV due to a needle stick, and was diagnosed with HIV in 1995. She later became the first pulpit rabbi to announce being diagnosed with AIDS, which she did in 1996 when she was a rabbi at Agudath Israel in Montgomery, Alabama. After revealing her diagnosis, her congregation rallied around her, insisting she continue to work, and wearing red AIDS awareness ribbons, but in 1997 she gave up her position and moved to Birmingham, Alabama, where she could get "cutting edge" treatment at the University of Alabama at Birmingham's AIDS research clinic. Culpeper spoke about AIDS to Jewish communities throughout America. However, she did not want to be known as "the AIDS rabbi". She died of AIDS in 2005. Block #6020 of the AIDS Memorial Quilt has a panel commemorating her.

== Achievements ==
Culpeper was the first full-time female rabbi in Alabama. She also became the first female rabbi to lead religious services in Poland when she conducted High Holy Day services at Beit Warszawa in 2000. Culpeper also contributed a chapter to the anthology The Women's Torah Commentary: New Insights from Women Rabbis on the 54 Weekly Torah Portions (2000).

== See also ==
- Timeline of women rabbis
