= Horace Tate =

American politician

Member of the Georgia State Senate from the 38th district
- In office January 1975 – January 11, 1993
- Preceded by: Leroy Johnson
- Succeeded by: Ralph David Abernathy III

Personal details
- Born: 1922 Elberton, Georgia, U.S.
- Died: November 28, 2002 (aged 79–80) Atlanta, Georgia, U.S.
- Resting place: Westview Cemetery
- Party: Democratic
- Children: 2, including Horacena
- Education: Fort Valley State College; University of Kentucky (PhD)
- Occupation: Educator; politician; activist

Horace Edward Tate (1922 – November 28, 2002) was an American educator, activist, scholar, and politician who spent most of his life and career working toward educational equity for Black Americans, particularly in the south. A Democrat, he served in the Georgia State Senate from 1975 to 1993.

== Early life and education ==
Born in 1922, Tate learned the value of education early on from his mother, not just as a means of personal growth, but as a way to combat oppression. He quoted her as saying "If you become a man of thought and learning, may you never fail with your right hand to tear down what your left hand has built up through years of thought and study if you see it not to be founded on that which is [true]." Tate would go on to attend Fort Valley State University, graduating at the age of 20, with a degree in education. Later, he would become the first African-American to earn a PhD from the University of Kentucky.

== Career ==
=== Educational career ===
Tate's career started soon after he received his undergraduate degree, as principal of two schools in Georgia, the first in Union Point, the second in Greensboro. He was the first African-American to run for mayor of Atlanta, Georgia, though unsuccessfully. He served as the chief executive of the Georgia Teachers and Education Association, soon after it became integrated. Then he became the first executive director of the Georgia Association of Educators, and a leader in the teachers' union. Much of his work involved uniting the efforts of both black and white teachers toward providing equal resources to all children in the state.

=== Political career ===
In 1969, Tate ran for mayor of Atlanta, but did not advance to the runoff. In 1974, Tate was elected to serve in the Georgia State Senate, district 38, a position he held for 16 years. His focus in the legislature, as it had been his whole career, was to promote educational equity and protect voting rights.

== Legacy ==
Something of an unsung hero in the story of U.S. Civil Rights, much of what Tate accomplished has been documented by education scholar Vanessa Siddle Walker, in whom Tate confided toward the end of his life. He is also the father of two children: retired college professor Veloisa Tate and Georgia state senator Horacena Tate, who later held his former seat, representing the 38th District in Fulton County, Georgia. He has one grandchild, Merisa T. Marsh who followed in his footsteps as an educator and serves as a principal in New Orleans and one grandchild Kennedy Marsh.
