= Gerald Neal =

American politician (born 1945)

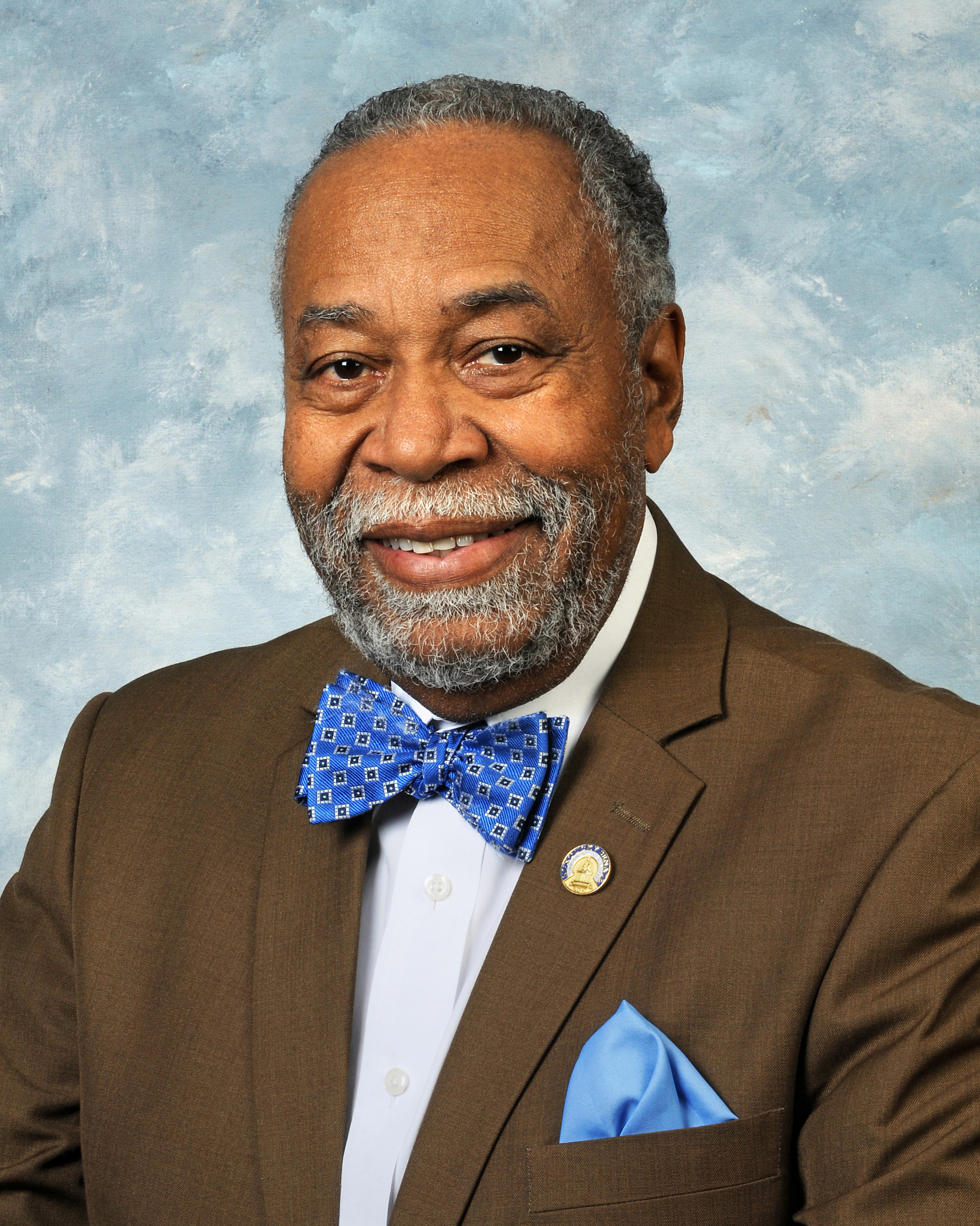
- Official portrait, 2020

Minority Leader of the Kentucky Senate
- Incumbent
- Assumed office January 3, 2023
- Preceded by: Morgan McGarvey

Member of the Kentucky Senate from the 33rd district
- Incumbent
- Assumed office January 1, 1989
- Preceded by: Georgia Davis Powers

Personal details
- Born: Gerald Anthony Neal; September 22, 1945 (age 80) Louisville, Kentucky, U.S.
- Party: Democratic
- Spouse: Kathy Cooksie
- Children: 5
- Education: Simmons College of Kentucky (attended); Kentucky State University (BA); University of Louisville (JD); University of Michigan (attended)

Gerald Anthony Neal (born September 22, 1945) is an American politician who has served as a member of the Kentucky Senate since 1989. A member of the Democratic Party, Neal represents Kentucky's 33rd Senate district, which includes part of Jefferson County.

Neal has been the longest-serving member of the senate since the resignation of senate president David Williams in 2012. Neal was selected as Minority leader by the Senate Democratic caucus following the election of incumbent Morgan McGarvey to congress in 2022.

== Early life ==
Gerald Neal was born on September 22, 1945. He graduated from Shawnee High School in Louisville in 1963 and Kentucky State University in 1967 with a Bachelor of Arts degree in history and political science, and was later bestowed an honorary Doctor of Humane Letters degree.

Neal received a Juris Doctor degree in 1972 from the University of Louisville's Brandeis School of Law, and was later named as their 2006 Distinguished Alumni Law Fellow. Neal pursued graduate studies in political science at the University of Michigan, and later returned to Kentucky to begin his legal career.

Neal was a member of the Jaycees.

== Career ==
Beginning his career at the Legal Aid Society and the Neighborhood Youth Corps before 1974, Neal committed to social justice and community empowerment. His advocacy efforts were recognized when he was appointed to a commission to study juvenile justice in 1974.

In 1975, Neal served on the Jefferson County Welfare Advisory Board and campaigned for Aubrey Williams in the Jefferson County Commissioner race. His commitment to public health and safety led to his appointment as assistant director of the Louisville Department of Public Health and Safety on July 22, 1975, by Director James E Thornberry during the administration of Mayor Harvey I. Sloane.

Neal lost the 8th ward Democratic aldermanic primary in April 1977 but soon after that, he was elected to the school board steering committee in July 1977. He was elected President of the Kentucky National Bar Association in 1977.

Neal was appointed to the Metropolitan Sewer District (MSD) board in 1979 by Louisville Mayor William B. Stansbury and later became its chairman on July 12, 1983, following an appointment by Mayor Harvey Sloane. He stepped into presidential politics when he joined the Walter Mondale coordinating committee in 1984.

In April 1988, Neal won election to the Kentucky Senate from the 33rd district, a position he continues to hold. His tenure has been marked by his involvement in significant initiatives, including his role as a member of Task Force 2000, which addressed the merger of Jefferson County and Louisville.

Neal was appointed Senior Fellow of Public Policy and adjunct professor in the College of Arts & Sciences, at the University of Louisville, where he taught and continues to teach courses in History, State and Local Government, Health and Welfare Policy, Civil Rights & the Law(including voter, housing, employment, education, and criminal justice). Neal is a practicing attorney with the law firm, Gerald A. Neal & Associates, LLC., in Louisville (KY).

Neal is the founder of the Kentucky African American All Children's Caucus which was dedicated to addressing issues of educational diversity, and the promotion of high educational standards facilitated by appropriate methodologies. He also is the founder of The African American Community Agenda Initiative (AAI) which focus on policy research, development, and community education. AAI brings together top policy makers and implementers for the purpose of engagement, analysis, and policy scrutiny leading to change.

Neal was elected to represent District 33 (in Jefferson County), being the second African American to serve, and first African American man elected to the Kentucky State Senate. Senator Neal was first elected in 1989 and has since been re-elected consecutively over the years. This represents the longest service of any African American member of the Kentucky General Assembly. He was elected Senate Democratic Caucus Chairman (2014), becoming the first African American elected to a leadership position in the history of Kentucky.

Neal was inducted into the Kentucky Civil Rights Hall of Fame (2001), and the Gallery of Great Black Kentuckians (2012). He has served as vice president, regional director and parliamentarian of the National Bar Association, and as president of the Kentucky Chapter of the National Bar Association. He is a member of the Kentucky Bar Association and is a Louisville and Kentucky Bar Association Fellow.

Neal has served as assistant director of Public Health and Safety for the City of Louisville, was a hearing officer for the State Workers' Compensation Board and worked as a juvenile probation officer. He served five terms as chair of the Louisville-Jefferson County Metropolitan Sewer District, where he increased the transparency of the agency, opening it to public scrutiny and involvement.

Beal attended the ceremony dedicating a historical marker near the former site of Eckstein Norton Institute.

== Legislation ==
In the Kentucky Senate, Neal has sponsored legislation requiring school districts to focus on equal educational opportunities. He is the founder of the Kentucky Education Reform African American and All Children's Caucus. He sponsored the law that created the KCHIP Program to provide health care coverage for more of Kentucky's uninsured children and expanded Medicaid coverage for children. He sponsored laws that required the identification of the special needs of the minority elderly population and created the African American Heritage Commission. He sponsored legislation amending the Kentucky Constitution to remove segregation by race, prohibit racial profiling by law enforcement, and prohibit the execution of a person when evidence shows racial bias in prosecution.

On May 27, 2010, the Senate adopted Senator Neal's resolution reaffirming the principles of equality preserved in the U. S. Constitution, the Civil Rights Act of 1964, and the Kentucky Civil Rights Act of 1966. The resolution states that the Senate "recognizes the need for equality of all persons in the United States, and in the Commonwealth of Kentucky, and the protection of that equality."

== Honors and awards ==
Senator Neal has received many honors and commendations for his distinguished service to community, the legal profession, and as a Kentucky State Legislator. Among his honors for distinguished service are the Clarence Mitchell Award from the Kentucky State Conference of NAACP Branches for his support of Civil Rights legislation; the Anderson Laureate Award for his impact on his community, state, and nation; the 1998 Man of the Year from Sigma Pi Phi fraternity-Psi Boule chapter; the 2001 Distinguished Citizen Award from the Kappa Alpha Psi fraternity; the Georgia Davis Powers Humanitarian Award; the Public Advocate Award for passage of legislation to Abolish Racial Profiling; the Kentucky Public Advocates Award for passage of the Racial Justice Act; and the Nelson Mandela Lifetime Achievement Award from the Kentucky Department of Public Advocacy. He served as a United Nations observer and Monitor for the historic April 1994 all- race elections in South Africa. He is a 2001 inductee of the Kentucky Civil Rights Hall of Fame.

== Personal life and health ==
Neal and his wife Kathy have two children Brandon and Kristin.

Neal was hospitalized in Louisville with COVID-19 on September 7, 2020.

== Electoral history ==
Louisville Board of Alderman Democratic Primary, 1977
Party	Candidate	Votes	%
Democratic	James Edward Allen	9,584	40.912
Democratic	Benny (Ben) Handy	8,763	37.41%
Democratic	Gerald A. (Jerry) Neal	5,079	21.68%
Total votes			100.0%

Kentucky Senate District 33 Democratic Primary, 1979
Party	Candidate	Votes	%
Democratic	Georgia Davis Powers	2,640	44.84%
Democratic	Gerald Neal	2,538	43.10%
Democratic	Mattie Jones	710	12.06%
Total votes			100.0%

Kentucky Senate District 33 Democratic Primary, 1988
Party	Candidate	Votes	%
Democratic	Gerald Neal	6,379	73.74%
Democratic	Mattie Johnson-Jones	2,272	26.26%
Total votes		8,651	100.0%

Kentucky Senate District 33 General Election, 1992
Party	Candidate	Votes	%
Democratic	Gerald Neal	27,599	100%
Total votes		27,599	100.0%

Kentucky Senate District 33 General Election, 1996
Party	Candidate	Votes	%
Democratic	Gerald Neal	24,373	100%
Total votes		24,373	100.0%

Kentucky Senate District 33 General Election, 2000
Party	Candidate	Votes	%
Democratic	Gerald Neal	26,168	100%
Total votes		26,168	100.0%

Kentucky Senate District 33 General Election, 2004
Party	Candidate	Votes	%
Democratic	Gerald Neal	33,552	100%
Total votes		33,552	100.0%

Kentucky Senate District 33 Democratic Primary, 2008
Party	Candidate	Votes	%
Democratic	Gerald Neal	17,971	80.73%
Democratic	Marshall "Marty" Gazaway	4,291	19.27%
Total votes		22,262	100.0%

Kentucky Senate District 33 General Election, 2008
Party	Candidate	Votes	%
Democratic	Gerald Neal	36,700	100%
Total votes		36,700	100.0%

Kentucky Senate District 33 General Election, 2012
Party	Candidate	Votes	%
Democratic	Gerald Neal	33,986	93.68%
Republican	Norris Shelton	2,291	6.32%
Total votes		36,277	100.0%

Kentucky Senate District 33 General Election, 2016
Party	Candidate	Votes	%
Democratic	Gerald Neal	34,588	84.32%
Republican	Shenita Rickman	6,432	15.68%
Total votes		41,020	100.0%

Kentucky Senate District 33 General Election, 2020
Party	Candidate	Votes	%
Democratic	Gerald Neal	38,520	100%
Total votes		38,520	100.0%

Kentucky Senate District 33 Democratic Primary, 2024
Party	Candidate	Votes	%
Democratic	Gerald Neal	4,854	55.31%
Democratic	Attica Scott	3,460	39.43%
Democratic	Michael W. Churchill Jr.	462	5.26%
Total votes		8,776	100.0%

Kentucky Senate
Preceded by Morgan McGarvey	Minority Leader of the Kentucky Senate; 2023–present	Incumbent
