= And the Walls Came Tumbling Down =

Book by Ralph Abernathy

- 2010 edition book cover
- Author: Ralph Abernathy
- Language: English
- Subject: Abernathy's participation in the Civil Rights Movement
- Genre: Autobiography
- Publisher: Harper and Row, HarperCollins
- Publication date: 1989
- Publication place: United States
- Media type: Print
- Pages: 672
- ISBN: 978-0060161927

And the Walls Came Tumbling Down is a 1989 autobiography written by civil rights leader Ralph Abernathy. The book charts his life and work with his best friend Dr. Martin Luther King Jr. in their leadership of the Civil Rights Movement to help African Americans obtain equal rights with white Americans. His book engendered much controversy due to Abernathy's allegations of King's infidelity the night before he was assassinated.

== Background ==
Ralph Abernathy was a leader of the civil rights movement, along with Martin Luther King Jr., whom he met in 1954; they eventually became close friends. Abernathy collaborated with King on many successful nonviolent movements, including their creation of the Montgomery Improvement Association, which led to the Montgomery bus boycott. The King and Abernathy partnership spearheaded movements as well in Albany, Georgia; Birmingham, Alabama; Mississippi; Washington, D.C.; Selma, Alabama; St. Augustine, Florida; Chicago; Memphis, and other cities. King and Abernathy shared a close relationship in their participation in the movement, sometimes sharing the same hotel rooms and leisure time with family and friends. Their relationship was so strong that they would dine together frequently, and each other's children called the other "Uncle". They were jailed a total of 17 times together for their involvement in the movement.

After King's assassination, Abernathy assumed control of the Southern Christian Leadership Conference, and continued to lead movements that he and King had discussed as well as other anti-segregation movements around the Capital Beltway. Abernathy's reasons for writing the book have been questioned; the book has been described as a biography of King as much as it is an autobiography of Abernathy.

As I listened to Ralph Abernathy and his eloquent and generous introduction and then thought about myself, I wondered who he was talking about. It's always good to have your closest friend and associate to say something good about you, and Ralph Abernathy is the best friend that I have in the world. — Dr. Martin Luther King Jr., during his last speech ever delivered I've Been to the Mountaintop

== Synopsis ==
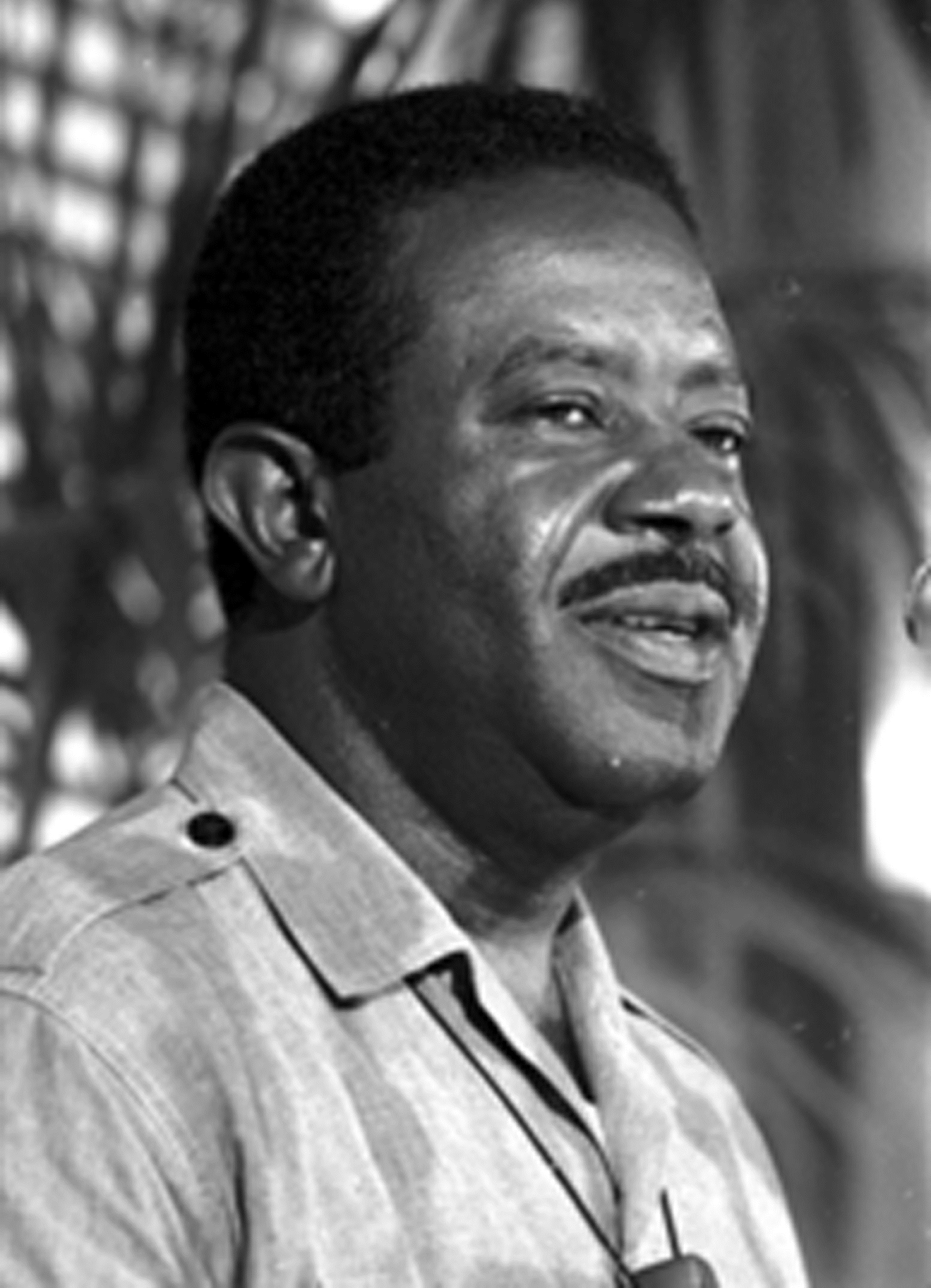
Ralph Abernathy in 1968

Abernathy relates the story of his close relationship with King. The book begins with details of his participation in the Montgomery bus boycott. He details how he was surprised to hear King's selection as leader of the Montgomery Improvement Association (MIA), but stated that he wished he had nominated him for the role himself. The autobiography details how he was elected program organizer, which made him the chief organizer of activities for the group. Abernathy states how this working relationship worked well as it split most of the responsibilities of the MIA between himself and King.

Abernathy asserts a very close relationship in the book, stating he and King "tried to meet for dinner every day" during the Montgomery boycott. The overall narrative paints an intertwined life between Abernathy and King. It details how King found Abernathy at an Atlanta church, and how the two became close friends and co-activists.

The duo of Abernathy and King is described as being extremely well-known wherever they went together. Abernathy describes how women would bring food to them to thank them for their efforts in their communities. The two frequently shared the same jail cell together during their many arrests for their protest actions. The two are described as so inseparable that Bull Connor, the elected Commissioner of Public Safety for the city of Birmingham, Alabama, termed them the "Gold Dust Twins" and required that both be put in solitary confinement as he said, "These two have never been separate...". It was during this separation that King wrote the famous Letter from Birmingham Jail on April 16, 1963.

External videos
- Booknotes interview with Abernathy on And the Walls Came Tumbling Down, October 29, 1989, C-SPAN

In the book, Abernathy recounts King's declining health during the movement in Selma in 1965. He describes how after a meeting with President Johnson, King had to be rushed to a hospital. Abernathy stated that this was a recurring stomach illness that plagued King during the entire course of their movement.

In the book, he also notably alleges King's marital infidelity, claiming that King had sexual relations with two women on the night of April 3, 1968 (after his "I've Been to the Mountaintop" speech that day), the night before he was assassinated.

Abernathy also explains his controversial endorsement of Ronald Reagan for president, but contrasts this with details of his frustrating efforts to collaborate with the Reagan administration after the election. He also detailed his thoughts on the status of the leadership of the civil rights movement in America, including discrediting Jesse Jackson among other prominent black leaders at the time.

== Controversy ==
The book's revelations became the source of much controversy, as did Abernathy. Jesse Jackson and other civil rights activists made a statement in October 1989—after the book's release—that the book was "slander" and that "brain surgery" must have altered Abernathy's perception. Jackson, Andrew Young, and more than two dozen other prominent black leaders held a press conference at King's graveside to condemn Abernathy's allegations. A review in the Chicago Tribune stated of the book: "Here is a man at pains to paint himself as closer than a brother to King: his confidant, alter-ego and most trusted adviser. And then he proves his closeness by betraying the confidence." In 1995, the first Black woman state senator from Kentucky, Georgia Davis Powers, claimed in her autobiography that she had been a mistress of King and appeared to corroborate Abernathy's account by stating that she had spent part of the final night of his life with him.

== See also ==
- Albany Movement
- Charles Sherrod
- Student Nonviolent Coordinating Committee
- Why We Can't Wait
