= Temple Beth Or =

Historic Reform synagogue in Montgomery, Alabama, US

- Location in Alabama

Religion
- Affiliation: Reform Judaism
- Ecclesiastical or organizational status: Synagogue
- Leadership: Rabbi Scott Looper
- Status: Active

Location
- Location: 2246 Narrow Lane Road, Cloverdale, Montgomery, Alabama 36106
- Country: United States
- Interactive map of Temple Beth Or
- Coordinates: 32°21′17″N 86°17′00″W

Architecture
- Architects: John Stewart (1862; attrib.); unknown (1902); unknown (1961)
- Type: Synagogue architecture
- Style: Romanesque Revival (1862); Neoclassical (1902)
- General contractor: Pelham J. Anderson (1862)
- Established: 1849 (as a congregation)
- Completed: 1862 (Catoma Street); 1902 (Clayton Street); 1961 (Cloverdale)
- Construction cost: $14,000 (1862)
- Dome: min. 4 (1902)

Website
- templebethor.net

Temple Beth Or (transliterated from Hebrew; "House of Light"), founded as Kahl Montgomery, is an historic Reform Jewish congregation and synagogue located at 2246 Narrow Lane Road, in the Cloverdale neighborhood of Montgomery, Alabama, in the United States.

== History ==
Jews in Montgomery first established Chevra Mevacher Cholim, a society to minister to the sick and bury the dead in 1846. An Orthodox congregation, named Kahl Montgomery, was formed on May 6, 1849, first meeting in the homes of members, and later renting space on Dexter Avenue. The congregation drafted an official charter in 1852.

=== Catoma Street building ===
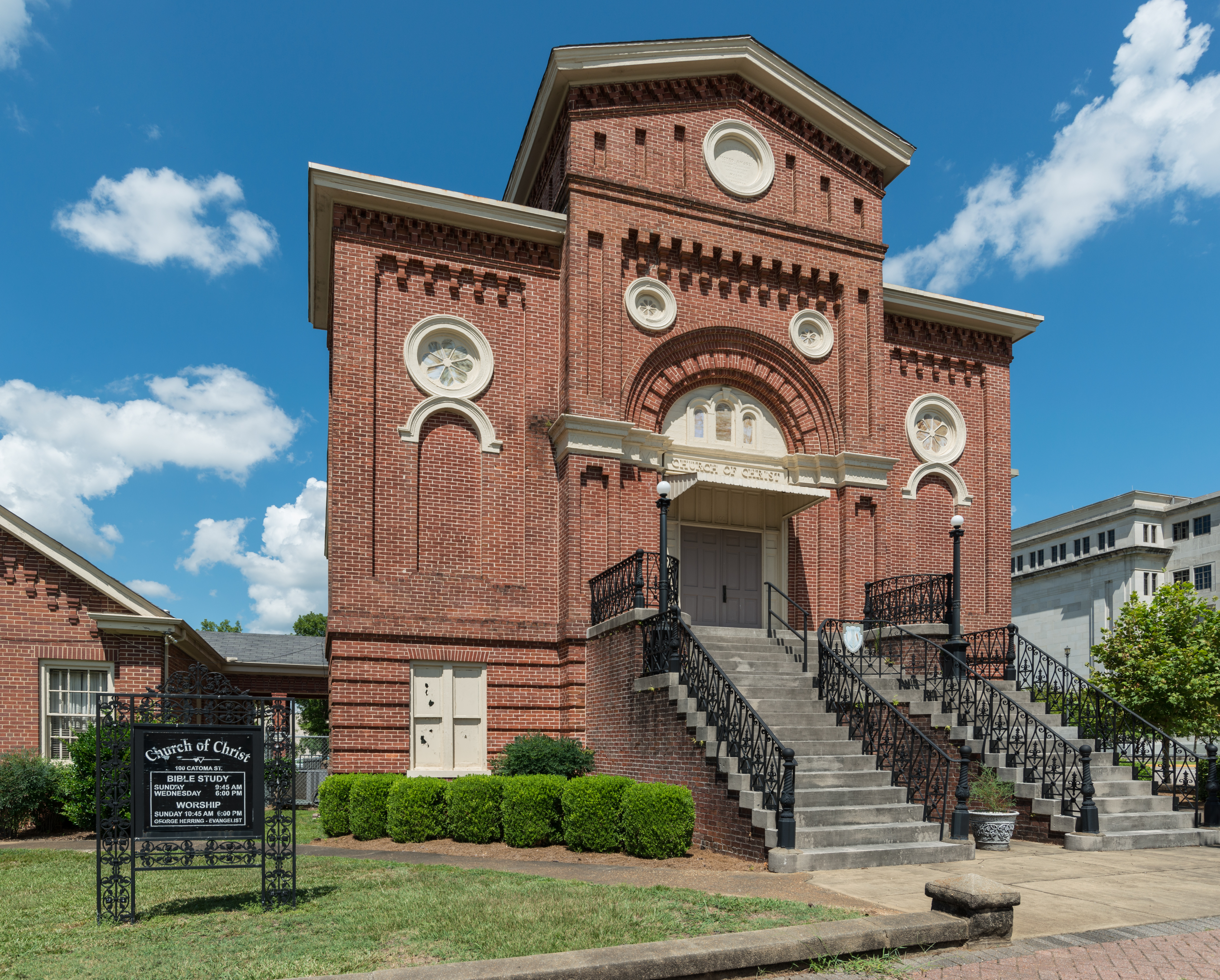
Former 1862 synagogue building, now church, on Catoma Street, in 2016.

In 1858, philanthropist Judah Touro left $2,000 to the congregation to purchase land for a temple. The brick temple in Rundbogenstil style was completed on March 8, 1862, at the corner of Church and Catoma Streets. The congregation used that building until 1901 and, despite internal protests about selling the edifice to an organization of another faith, it was sold for $7,500 to a Christian church. As of 2021, the building has continuously operated as a church since 1901, in the main as the Catoma Street Church of Christ.

Adolph S. Moses served as rabbi from 1870 to 1871. By 1870, the congregation had grown considerably, and ritual changes continued to occur. In 1874, the congregation adopted a Reform ritual and modelled it after Temple Emanu El of New York City, and was renamed Temple Beth Or. From 1876 to 1888, Hungarian-born Sigmund Hecht served as the rabbi. He also helped to establish a Sunday school.

=== Clayton Street building ===
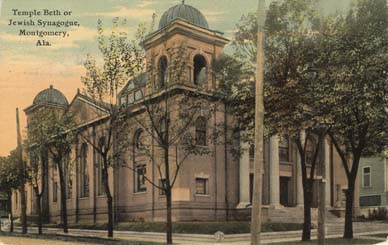
A postcoard image of the former 1902 synagogue building, at 103 Clayton Street, in c. 1910, since demolished.

In 1902, some more recent Ashkenazi immigrants split off to form Agudath Israel Etz Ahayem. On June 6, 1902 a new temple at 103 Clayton Street, on the corner of Sayre Street, was dedicated. Completed in the Neoclassical style by an unnamed architect, a wide flight of steps led to the monumental entrance through a columnar portico with four tall Doric columns. Stair towers framed the portico façade, topped by open belvederes with small domes. A larger dome was set over the sanctuary. The building was demolished after the 1960s.

=== Racial segregation views ===
Rabbi Benjamin Goldstein, from New York, served the congregation from 1928. Goldstein was a vocal defendant of the Scottsboro Boys, in his sermons, at public rallies, connecting them with lawyers from International Labor Defense, the legal arm of the American Communist Party; and he was the only white clergyman to visit the defendants in prison. The congregation, at the time a supporter of racial segregation and under threats from the Ku Klux Klan to withdraw support of Jewish businesses, asked Goldstein to tender his resignation in April 1933.

In 1933 Rabbi Eugene Blachschleger assumed the position of rabbi; and during his tenure the congregation was vocal in its opposition of the Montgomery bus boycott, a political and social protest against racial segregation on public transportation.

=== Move to Cloverdale ===
By the 1960s, the congregation had outgrown their temple once more. They decided to build a new Beth Or in the Cloverdale neighborhood. The current synagogue was dedicated in 1961.

In 1965 Rabbi David A. Baylinson was elected by the congregation after the untimely death of Rabbi Blachschleger. During Rabbi Baylinson's nearly thirty years with the congregation, Bar and Bat mitzvot ceremonies were re-instituted and the prayer books Gates of Prayer and Gates of Repentance were introduced. In 1988, the entrance to the sanctuary, the religion school wing, grounds, and social hall were all renovated. Rabbi Baylinson retired in 1994 as Rabbi Emeritus. Rabbi Elliot L. Stevens, held the post from July 2007, until his death in 2017. Rabbi Scott Looper has served as rabbi since July, 2018.
