= Sigmund Hecht =

Hungarian-born American rabbi

- Born: August 1, 1849; Hlinik, Hungary
- Died: June 27, 1925 (aged 75)
- Education: University of Alabama
- Occupation: Rabbi
- Parent: Moritz Hecht

Sigmund Hecht (1849–1925) was a Hungarian-born American Reform rabbi. An immigrant to the United States, he served congregations in Alabama and Wisconsin before serving as the fifth rabbi of Congregation B'nai B'rith, the oldest synagogue in Los Angeles, California, from 1899 to 1919.

== Early life ==
Sigmund Hecht was born on August 1, 1849, in Hlinik, Hungary. His father was named Moritz Hecht. He grew up in Zsolna, Hungary and went to a rabbinic seminary in Vienna, Austria, receiving a degree in Jewish theology in Bistrizt, Hungary.

He immigrated to the United States in his early twenties, arriving in 1868, three years after the American Civil War of 1861-1865. He first studied Jewish theology in New York City. He then moved to the American South, where he received a Doctorate of Divinity from the University of Alabama in 1886.

== Career ==
He served as a rabbi at Temple Beth Or in Montgomery, Alabama, from 1876 to 1888. During that time, he established a Sunday school. He then the served as the rabbi of Emanu-El in Milwaukee, Wisconsin, from 1888 to 1899.

His third service was at Congregation B'nai B'rith in Los Angeles, California, where he was the senior rabbi from 1899 to 1919. He paved the way for more fundraising and established programs for women and young people. He also oversaw the move of the Jewish cemetery from Chavez Ravine to the Home of Peace Memorial Park in East Los Angeles. In 1916, he trained Edgar Magnin, who went on to serve as the rabbi of B'nai B'rith from 1919 to 1984.

He wrote Post Biblical History: A Compedium Of Jewish History from the Close of the Biblical Records to the Present Day (for the Home and Sabbath School), published by the Bloch Printing Company / the American Jewish Publishing House in 1896.

== Death ==
He died on June 27, 1925. He was seventy-six years old. His papers are kept at The Jacob Rader Marcus Center of the American Jewish Archives in Cincinnati, Ohio.
