= Kentucky's 33rd Senate district =

American legislative district

Kentucky's 33rd State Senate district
Senator
Gerald A. Neal; D–Louisville
since January 1, 1989
- Registration: 71.9% Democratic; 17.7% Republican; 9.9% No party preference
- Demographics: 35.9% White; 55.0% Black; 4.7% Hispanic; 0.6% Asian; 0.1% Native American; 0.1% Hawaiian/Pacific Islander; 0.4% Other; 3.3% Multiracial
- Population (2023): 116,065
- Registered voters (2025): 85,412

Kentucky's 33rd Senatorial district is one of 38 districts in the Kentucky Senate. It comprises part of Jefferson County. It has been represented by Gerald A. Neal (D–Louisville) since 1989. As of 2023, the district had a population of 116,065.

== Voter registration ==
On January 1, 2025, the district had 85,412 registered voters, who were registered with the following parties.

Party	Registration	
Party	Voters	%
Democratic	61,409	71.90
Republican	15,153	17.74
Independent	3,166	3.71
Libertarian	242	0.28
Green	63	0.07
Constitution	24	0.03
Socialist Workers	17	0.02
Reform	8	0.01
"Other"	5,330	6.24
Total	85,412	100.00
Source: Kentucky State Board of Elections

== Election results from statewide races ==
=== 2022 – present ===
Year	Office	Results (Note: Figures presented in this table are calculated by summing precinct election results published by the Kentucky State Board of Elections, using precinct data that list each precinct's senatorial district.)
2022	Senator	Booker 77.7 - 22.2%
2022	Amendment 1	No 72.6 - 27.4%
2022	Amendment 2	No 78.8 - 21.2%
2023	Governor	Beshear 86.0 - 14.0%
2023	Secretary of State	Wheatley 78.4 - 21.6%
2023	Attorney General	Stevenson 81.3 - 18.7%
2023	Auditor of Public Accounts	Reeder 79.8 - 20.2%
2023	State Treasurer	Bowman 82.0 - 18.0%
2023	Commissioner of Agriculture	Enlow 81.0 - 19.0%
2024	President	Harris 73.5 - 25.1%
2024	Amendment 1	No 56.8 - 43.2%
2024	Amendment 2	No 77.2 - 22.8%

== List of members representing the district ==
Member	Party	Years	Electoral history	District location
Bernard J. Bonn (Louisville)	Democratic	January 1, 1948 – January 1, 1968	Elected in 1947. Reelected in 1951. Reelected in 1955. Reelected in 1959. Reelected in 1963. Retired.	1944–1964; Jefferson County (part).
Bernard J. Bonn (Louisville)	Democratic	January 1, 1948 – January 1, 1968	Elected in 1947. Reelected in 1951. Reelected in 1955. Reelected in 1959. Reelected in 1963. Retired.	1964–1972
Georgia Powers (Louisville)	Democratic	January 1, 1968 – January 1, 1989	Elected in 1967. Reelected in 1971. Reelected in 1975. Reelected in 1979. Reelected in 1983. Retired.	1964–1972
Georgia Powers (Louisville)	Democratic	January 1, 1968 – January 1, 1989	Elected in 1967. Reelected in 1971. Reelected in 1975. Reelected in 1979. Reelected in 1983. Retired.	1972–1974
Georgia Powers (Louisville)	Democratic	January 1, 1968 – January 1, 1989	Elected in 1967. Reelected in 1971. Reelected in 1975. Reelected in 1979. Reelected in 1983. Retired.	1974–1984
Georgia Powers (Louisville)	Democratic	January 1, 1968 – January 1, 1989	Elected in 1967. Reelected in 1971. Reelected in 1975. Reelected in 1979. Reelected in 1983. Retired.	1984–1993; Jefferson County (part).
Gerald A. Neal (Louisville)	Democratic	January 1, 1989 – present	Elected in 1988. Reelected in 1992. Reelected in 1996. Reelected in 2000. Reelected in 2004. Reelected in 2008. Reelected in 2012. Reelected in 2016. Reelected in 2020. Reelected in 2024.	1984–1993; Jefferson County (part).
Gerald A. Neal (Louisville)	Democratic	January 1, 1989 – present	Elected in 1988. Reelected in 1992. Reelected in 1996. Reelected in 2000. Reelected in 2004. Reelected in 2008. Reelected in 2012. Reelected in 2016. Reelected in 2020. Reelected in 2024.	1993–1997
Gerald A. Neal (Louisville)	Democratic	January 1, 1989 – present	Elected in 1988. Reelected in 1992. Reelected in 1996. Reelected in 2000. Reelected in 2004. Reelected in 2008. Reelected in 2012. Reelected in 2016. Reelected in 2020. Reelected in 2024.	1997–2003
Gerald A. Neal (Louisville)	Democratic	January 1, 1989 – present	Elected in 1988. Reelected in 1992. Reelected in 1996. Reelected in 2000. Reelected in 2004. Reelected in 2008. Reelected in 2012. Reelected in 2016. Reelected in 2020. Reelected in 2024.	2003–2015
Gerald A. Neal (Louisville)	Democratic	January 1, 1989 – present	Elected in 1988. Reelected in 1992. Reelected in 1996. Reelected in 2000. Reelected in 2004. Reelected in 2008. Reelected in 2012. Reelected in 2016. Reelected in 2020. Reelected in 2024.	2015–2023
Gerald A. Neal (Louisville)	Democratic	January 1, 1989 – present	Elected in 1988. Reelected in 1992. Reelected in 1996. Reelected in 2000. Reelected in 2004. Reelected in 2008. Reelected in 2012. Reelected in 2016. Reelected in 2020. Reelected in 2024.	2023–present
