= Juanita Abernathy =

American civil rights activist (1931–2019)

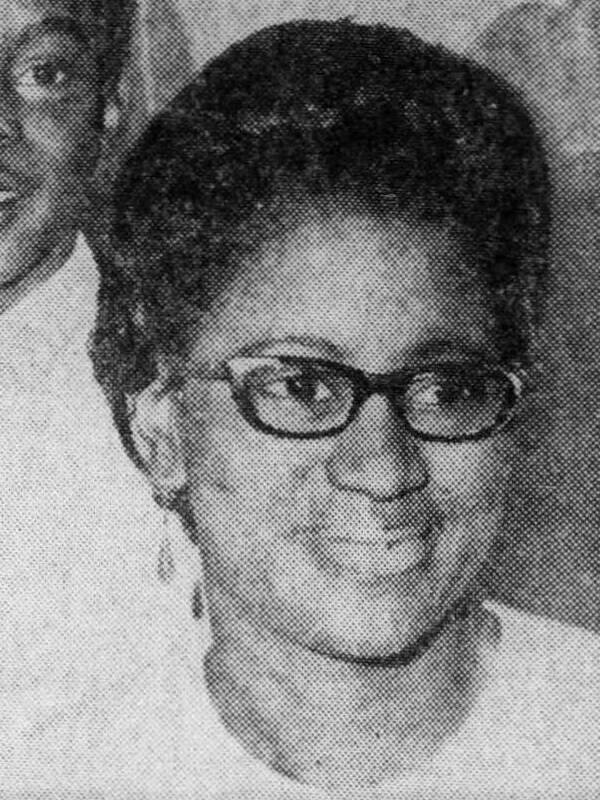
- Abernathy in 1970
- Born: Juanita Odessa Jones; December 1, 1931; Uniontown, Alabama, U.S.
- Died: September 12, 2019 (aged 87); Atlanta, Georgia, U.S.
- Education: Tennessee State University
- Occupations: Civil rights activist, educator, businesswoman
- Spouse: Ralph Abernathy (m. 1952)
- Children: 5, including Donzaleigh and Ralph III

Juanita Odessa Jones Abernathy (December 1, 1931 – September 12, 2019) was an American civil rights activist. She was the wife of fellow civil rights activist Ralph Abernathy.

== Biography ==
Abernathy was born on December 1, 1931, in Uniontown, Alabama. She studied at Selma University and the Tennessee State University, graduating from both. She worked as an educator and saleswoman for Mary Kay Cosmetics. She also served on the board of trustees for the Morehouse School of Religion, and on the board of directors for the Atlanta Fulton County League of Women Voters and the Metropolitan Atlanta Rapid Transit Authority.

Abernathy was a part of the team that organized the Montgomery bus boycott of December 1955 through December 1956. She lived in Montgomery until January 1957, when her home, which was the meetingplace for organizing the boycott, was bombed by white supremacists; afterward she moved to Atlanta. In 1965, she walked in the Selma to Montgomery marches. She and her husband, Ralph Abernathy, were key members in the founding of the Southern Christian Leadership Conference.

In 2013, Abernathy was honored by the Atlanta City Council with a proclamation.

She married Ralph Abernathy on August 31, 1952. Together, they had five children: Ralph David Abernathy Jr., Juandalynn Ralpheda, Donzaleigh Avis, Ralph David Abernathy III, and Kwame Luthuli Abernathy. Abernathy Jr. died at two days old, while their other children lived on to adulthood. She enrolled her children into white schools to fight segregation in schools. She died on September 12, 2019, aged 87, in Atlanta.
