= Burt Schuman =

Burt Schuman (1948 - 2024) is the first Polish postwar rabbi of Reform Judaism. Originally from New York, NY, Rabbi Schuman spent 11 years as the rabbi of Temple Beth Israel in Altoona, Pennsylvania.
