= Donzaleigh Abernathy =

American actress and author (born 1957)

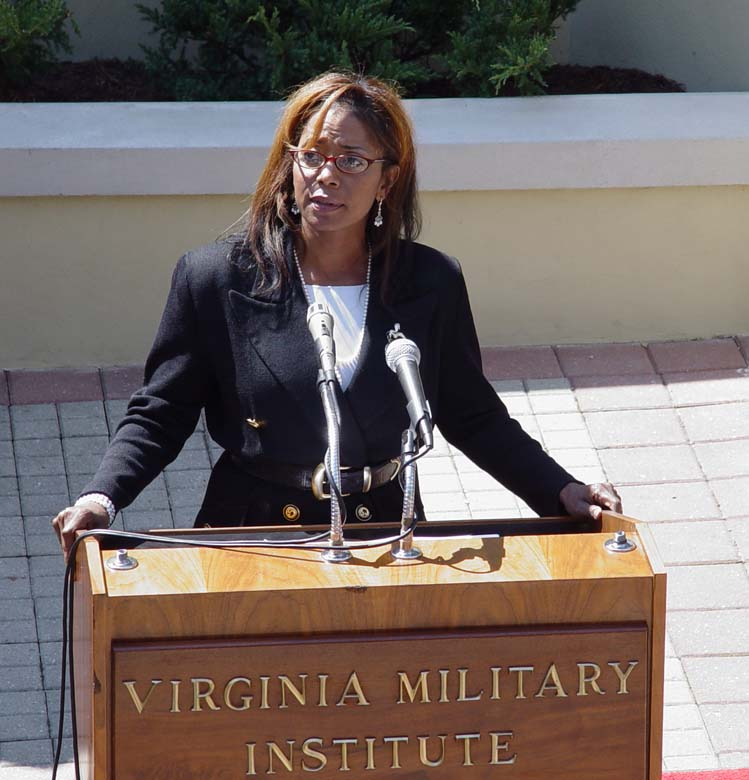
- Abernathy speaking at the Virginia Military Institute in 2003
- Born: August 5, 1957 (age 69); Montgomery, Alabama, U.S.
- Education: Emerson College
- Occupations: Actress, author, civil rights activist
- Years active: 1990–present
- Parents: Ralph Abernathy; Juanita Abernathy

Donzaleigh Abernathy (born August 5, 1957) is an American actress, author and civil rights activist.

== Early life ==
Abernathy’s mother was pregnant with her when her parents’ home was bombed in the pre-dawn hours of January 10, 1957 after the successful close of the Montgomery Bus Boycott. Abernathy was born in the segregated St. Jude’s Hospital Montgomery, Alabama and lived there through the “Freedom Riders” movement. In 1962, at the request of the Reverend Martin Luther King Jr., her family moved to Atlanta, Georgia where she grew up. There, her father, Ralph David Abernathy, Sr. continued his work co-leading the Civil Rights Movement with King. In 1965, after participating in “The Selma to Montgomery March for the Right To Vote,” the Abernathy children, along with the King children integrated Spring Street Elementary School and began mass integration of public schools in the South. Abernathy briefly attended the Northside High School for the Performing Arts, before attending and graduating from George School, a Quaker Prep School in Bucks County, Pennsylvania.

Her father was Rev. Ralph Abernathy, a co-founder and co-leader of the American civil rights movement, and her mother was the lifelong civil rights activist Juanita Jones Abernathy. She, her sister Juandalynn and brother Ralph David III joined their parents on all the major civil rights marches and witnessed first-hand many significant events of the Civil Rights movement. Her family was very close to that of Martin Luther King Jr, a prominent leader of the Civil Rights movement. The Abernathy and King children went to school together, performed extracurricular activities together, spent Saturday and Sunday dinners together, as well as spent vacations and holidays together. According to Ms. Abernathy herself, children from both families would hold performances for their parents and their childhood acting teacher Mr. Walter Roberts, the father of movie stars Julia Roberts and Eric Roberts, on these occasions with Yolanda King, one of King's daughters, acting as the director and Dr. King filming their performances. Abernathy has stated "that's really when [she] started acting." She is married to actor/producer Dar Dixon.

== Career ==
After graduating from Emerson College in Boston, Abernathy moved to New York. She landed her first job after auditioning for a role with the Off Off Broadway production and worked for the Production Designer Eugene Lee and Costume Designer Franne Lee of “Saturday Night Live.” She played Lady in Orange in the Alliance Theater’s Southeastern Equity Tour of “For Colored Girls” and Iris in the Alliance Theater’s “Antony and Cleopatra“ with Jane Alexander and Ed Moore. Since then, Ms. Abernathy has played roles in many movies and television movies, such as Mrs. Don King in the Award Winning HBO Drama “Don King, Only in America.” In the historical Civil War drama Gods and Generals, she portrays the slave, Martha. Although the film itself was not critically well-received, Abernathy was praised for her part by film critic Roger Ebert. Another reviewer stated that "Abernathy's image of Martha combines strength with glamour." She starred for four years as a series regular on Lifetime's Any Day Now. Born in the midst of the Civil Rights Movement after her parents’ home was bombed, Ms. Abernathy’s life has been dedicated to civil and human rights.

== Filmography ==
=== Film ===
Year	Title	Role	Notes
1990	Ghost Dad	ER Nurse	
1994	Camp Nowhere	Dorothy ~ Walter’s Mom	
1995	Night of the Running Man	Francine	
1995	Lone Justice 2	Effie Petit	
2003	Gods and Generals	Martha	
2003	Leprechaun: Back 2 tha Hood	Esmeralda	Video
2006	Grilled	Karen	
2015	Fingerprints	Delphine Frost	
2016	Sleight	Mary	
2016	59 Seconds	Katherine	
2020	The Industry Did It	Aunt Urtha	
2025	TOWPATH	Lena Bryant Johnson	

=== Television ===
Year	Title	Role	Notes
1990	Murder in Mississippi	Sue	TV film
1990, 1992	L.A. Law	Jenny Manley, Naomi	Episodes: "Watts a Matter?", "Silence of the Lambskins"
1992	Grass Roots	Cora Mae Turner	TV film
1993	Sirens	Mariah Henry	Episode: "Strike Two"
1993	Bodies of Evidence	Clarissa Watson	Episode: "Endangered Species"
1993	Ned Blessing: The True Story of My Life	Effie Pettit	Episode: "Return to Plum Creek"
1994	NYPD Blue	Mrs. Danton	Episode: "Guns 'n Rosaries"
1994	Family Album	Lorrie	TV miniseries
1995	Amazing Grace	D.A. Goodwin	Episode: "Family Values"
1995	Cagney & Lacey: Together Again	Alcina Lewis	TV film
1996	Dangerous Minds	Irene Timmons	Episodes: "Pilot", "Family Ties", "Need Deep"
1997	Miss Evers' Boys	Betty	TV film
1997	EZ Streets	Patricia Wyler	Episodes: "St. Jude Took a Bullet", "One Acquainted with the Night"
1997	The Burning Zone	Nora Dawson	Episode: "Wild Fire"
1997	Don King: Only in America	Henrietta King	TV film
1998	The Pretender	Susan Healy	Episode: "Hazards"
1998	Chicago Hope	Porschia Tate	Episode: "Absent Without Leave"
1998	The Tempest	Mambo Azaleigh	TV film
1998–2002	Any Day Now	Sara Jackson	Main role
1999	The Sky's On Fire	Dr. Hellstrom	TV film
2002	Whitewash: The Clarence Brandley Story	Narrator	TV film
2003	24	Barbara Maccabee	Episodes: "Day 2: 5:00p.m.-6:00pm", "Day 2: 6:00pm-7:00pm"
2004	Judging Amy	Denise Lawrence	Episode: "Conditional Surrender"
2005–2006	Commander in Chief	Patricia	Recurring role (season 1)
2006	House	Brady	Episode: "Skin Deep"
2008	CSI: Crime Scene Investigation	Carolina Bell	Episode: "For Gedda"
2008–2009	Lincoln Heights	Hazel Glass	Episodes: "The Price You Pay", "Lucky"
2012–2013	The Walking Dead	Dr. Stevens	Episodes: "Walk with Me", "Made to Suffer", "The Suicide King"
2013	Shameless	Tawny	Episode: "Civil Wrongs"
2015	Father Pete's Corner	The Fairy	TV series
2016	Suits	Gloria Danner	Episodes: "Tick Tock", "25th Hour"
2016	Shooter	Mrs. Fenn	Episodes: "Exfil", "Overwatch"
2017	Chicago P.D.	Jeanette Barnes	Episode: "Don't Read the News"
2019	Words & Actions	Monica Henderson	Episode: "Man Delights Not Me, Nor Woman Neither"
2021	NCIS	NSA Deputy Director Ellis	Episode: “Rule 91”
2022	Good Sam	Carla	Episode: “A Light in the Storm”
2022	All Rise	Ness’ Mother	Episode: “Unwanted Guest”
2022	9-1-1	Joanne Kingston	Episode: ”The Devil You Know”

== Books ==
The 2001 Smithsonian Institution's book of essays, In the spirit of Martin: the living legacy of Dr. Martin Luther King, Jr. Donzaleigh Abernathy was one of the contributing authors. In 2004, she authored the book Partners To History - Martin Luther King, Ralph David Abernathy and the Civil Rights Movement, in honor of her parents. The book was nominated by the American Library Association as one of the “Best Books for Young Adults,” 2003.

== Bibliography ==
- Partners to History: Martin Luther King Jr., Ralph David Abernathy, and the Civil Rights Movement (Crown, 2003) ISBN 978-0-609-60914-9
- In the spirit of Martin: the living legacy of Dr. Martin Luther King, Jr. (Tinwood Books, 2002) ISBN 978-0965376655
