= Horacena Tate =

American politician

Member of the Georgia State Senate from the 38th district
- In office January 11, 1999 – January 13, 2025
- Preceded by: Ralph David Abernathy III
- Succeeded by: RaShaun Kemp

Personal details
- Born: May 8, 1956 (age 69) Griffin, Georgia, U.S.
- Party: Democratic
- Parent: Horace Tate (father)
- Education: University of Georgia (BSEd); Clark Atlanta University (MA, EdD)

Horacena E. Tate (born May 8, 1956) is an American politician who served in the Georgia State Senate, representing the 38th District in Fulton County.

== Biography ==
Tate was born in Griffin, Georgia, but raised in Atlanta. Her father Horace Tate served in the Georgia Senate from 1975 to 1993. In 1977, she obtained a Bachelor of Science degree from the University of Georgia. A Master's degree in Educational Administration followed from Atlanta University in 1988. She received a Ph.D. in 1992 from Clark-Atlanta University, also in Educational Administration.

Tate was first elected to the Georgia State Senate in 1998, winning the Senate seat formerly occupied by her father. She currently serves on the following committees:

- Appropriations
- Health and Human Services
- Retirement
- State and Local Governmental Operations

== Awards and recognition ==
- 2003 Leader of Distinction Award, Alpha Kappa Alpha sorority
- 2001 Public Servant Award, Coalition on Hunger
- 2000 Distinguished Public Servant Award, Martin Luther King Jr. Drive Merchant Association
- 2000 Legislator of the Year Award, National Association of Social Workers - Georgia Chapter
- 2000 Leader of Distinction Award, Alpha Kappa Alpha sorority
- 1999 Leader of Distinction Award, Alpha Kappa Alpha sorority
