= Altoona Alliance Church =

Church in Pennsylvania, US

Coordinates: 40.5171°N 78.4021°W

Altoona Alliance Church is a church associated with the Christian and Missionary Alliance located in Altoona, Pennsylvania. It was founded in 1891 by Rev. Frederick Senft, who would one day go on to become president of the Christian and Missionary Alliance. Over the 119 years of its existence the Altoona Alliance Church has had 26 pastors and has been located in at least 17 different locations throughout the city. Currently the Altoona Alliance Church is led by Rev. Tim McGarvey, who graduated from Toccoa Falls College with a B.A. in Pastoral Ministries.

== History ==
=== Beginnings ===
Many were attracted to the Christian and Missionary Alliance, in its origin, because of the ministry of healing, and a striking parallel is noted in the founding of the Altoona Alliance Church in 1891, just four years after the founding of the national movement. A lady from Altoona, Pennsylvania, suffering from cancer, went to Pittsburgh, where she came into contact with two Christian workers of the Christian and Missionary Alliance church in that city, who prayed for her healing. After her healing she was very desirous that a full Gospel work be opened in her city, and in that same year Rev. and Mrs. Frederick H. Senft were invited to Altoona, Pa. Rev. Senft arrived in Altoona, Pa February 1891 and this was the official start of the Christian & Missionary Alliance in Altoona. After much prayer they arranged for a convention that summer in the Fifth Avenue Methodist church, securing as speakers, Dr. and Mrs. A. B. Simpson and several others. Those receiving blessing at these services desired the Alliance work continue, meeting at times to pray to that end. During the latter part of 1891 services were held in the home of the Blackwell family at 1900 10th Street. As a result, on January 23, 1892, Rev. Senft opened a Gospel Mission on 17th Street at Union and 11th Avenues. In July, 1893 the church moved to 1200 6th Avenue where a large front room served as the church meeting location, and two years later in 1894, the attendance demanded larger quarters, the pastor moved to 1428 8th Avenue, where they remained until April, 1896. In this year, Rev. Senft, acceding to the wishes of Dr. A. B. Simpson, moved to Philadelphia where an Alliance church was also established and in which city he spent the major part of his life. Under the leadership of Rev. Senft the congregation grew to more than 100 persons. Altoona, as far as can be learned, was the 2nd Alliance work in Pennsylvania. After Rev. Senft departed in 1896, Rev. B. M. Osgood became the pastor of the Altoona Alliance congregation. The church move buildings to 8th Avenue at 9th Street and continued to meet there until 1898. During this two-year period there were three pastors of the church. During the year of 1898, newly appointed Rev. Bush moved the church to 906 Green Avenue, where they held meetings on the second flood of the building. The church remained at this location until 1900.

=== Early 20th century ===
The early 20th century was a time of great change in the Altoona Alliance Church. Starting in 1900 Rev. C. L. Eicher became the pastor of the church. During his tenor the church moved from 906 Green Avenue to 1106 16th Street in 1902 and then to 710 15th Street in 1903. In 1901 during Eicher's tenor, as pastor, the church saw the need to start a Sunday School program. A. C. Yingling became the first superintendent of the program. In 1904 the church moved to 723 Chestnut Avenue under the leadership of Rev. F. J. Potter. In December 1904 Rev. Samuel Dancy became the pastor of the prospering church and remained pastor until June 1908. From June until December, of the same year, the church was without a full-time pastor. In December 1908 Rev. H. M. Herr became the pastor and he remained in that position until June 1918. Under Rev. Herr's leadership the Altoona Alliance Church of the Christian & Missionary Alliance applied for a Charter. The Charter was filed on May 22, 1911, and approved on June 12, 1911. In 1914 the congregation purchased a lot at 807 15th Street and began building a church on June 21. The new building was completed on December 20, 1914. The building at 807 15th Street served as the home of the church family for 14 years. Rev. E. I. Milburn the pastor of the Altoona Alliance Church from December 1918 to April 1926 started a weekly radio program which later became known as the Alliance Hour. This program during the tenor of Rev. E. H. Patterson the church property was sold and a new location was chosen to build a church. The location chosen for the new building was at the corner of 11th Street and 16th Avenue and construction started on February 3, 1929. Until the building was completed the church met in the local theater building at 1125 8th Avenue. The new church building was completed in June 1929 and was dedicated to Rev. Senft the founder of the Altoona Alliance Church.

=== Late 20th century ===
Rev. Gene Bartmas became the pastor of the Altoona Alliance Church in 1969. Under his leadership the Alliance Hour radio program reached an impressive goal for such a small broadcast. The church aired its one-thousandth broadcast January 18, 1970. Under Rev. Bartmas the church also saw many revisions and expansions to meet the needs of the growing congregation. In 1980 Rev Bartmas and the church family realized that the church building at 16th Avenue and 17th Street was no longer meeting the churches needs and a building committee was formed. On August 23, 1982, the Altoona Alliance Church held a dedication service at the new property located at 1319 South Jaggard Street. The new church building was completed the next year and the first service held on June 26, 1983. Rev. Bartmas remained the pastor of the Altoona Alliance Church until he retired in 1992. Upon Bartmas' retirement Rev. Charles Stump pastored the church until 1997 and Scott Maganella finished out the 1997 year as an interim pastor. In March 1998 Rev. Timothy McGarvey became the pastor of the church. In 1999 Rev. McGarvey with the approval of the church board hired the church's first youth pastor.

=== 21st century ===
In January, 2002, Rev. Tim McGarvey hired Rev. James Cameron to replace the prior youth pastor. Rev. James Cameron served as youth pastor at Altoona Alliance Church until August, 2008.

== Ministries Offered ==
As a member of the Christian and Missionary Alliance the Altoona Alliance Church offers a variety of ministries to those in the church and the community around them while also maintaining a heart for foreign missions.

=== Altoona Alliance Youth (AAC) ===
The AAC is a ministry available for youth ranging from 13–18 years of age. The majority of this group is made up of members of the church and those who attend the church on a regular basis, but also contains youth who are not associated with the church in any other way. The goal of this ministry is to provide a place where youth can come learn about the Christian faith, develop and strengthen their faith, and learn how to become living, loving, learning, and active followers of Jesus Christ. This ministry is also an outreach program used by the church to reach youth in the community who are in need of spiritual guidance and love.

=== Alliance Men ===
Is a group for men in the church to gather together for fellowship, prayer, ministry, and encouragement. The mission statement of the group is "Living the Adventure". The Alliance Men are active in the community and foster service projects were the men can come into contact with those in the community. The Alliance Men group also raises money to send out missionaries and sponsors an annual golf tournament with the proceeds going towards short term missions.

=== Alliance Women ===
Is a group for women in the church to gather together for fellowship, Bible study, a study of various countries where our missionaries are located, and prayer. The focus of this group is support of missionaries by raising support and through prayer. Every year the Alliance Women sponsor a "Women's Retreat" where woman from around the state gather together for fellowship, prayer, and encouragement. The Alliance Women's group also sponsors a "Mother and Daughter" event as well as several other smaller events throughout the year.

=== 55 Alive ===
Is a ministry offered for anyone who is 55 years old or older. The focus of this group is socialization, encouragement, and prayer. During their once a month meetings a guest speaker may be invited and a meal is available. The group also travels for special events and dinners.
