= Ralph Abernathy =

American activist and minister (1926–1990)

The Reverend Ralph Abernathy
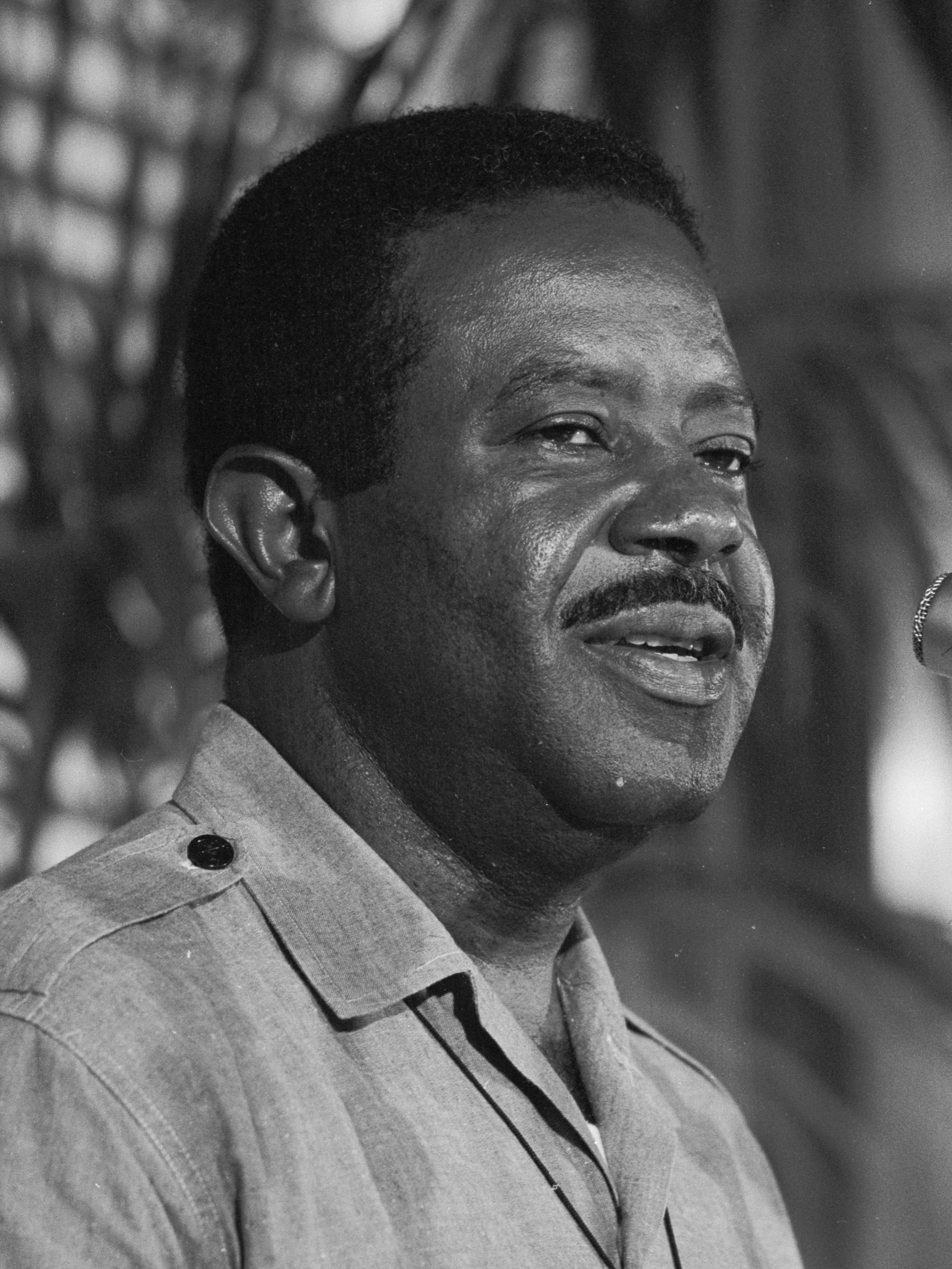
- Abernathy in 1968

2nd President of the Southern Christian Leadership Conference
- In office 1968–1977
- Preceded by: Martin Luther King Jr.
- Succeeded by: Joseph Lowery

Personal details
- Born: David Abernathy; March 11, 1926 Linden, Alabama, U.S.
- Died: April 17, 1990 (aged 64) Atlanta, Georgia, U.S.
- Party: Democratic
- Spouse: Juanita Jones Abernathy
- Children: 5, including Ralph III and Donzaleigh
- Education: Alabama State University (BS), Atlanta University (MA)
- Occupation: Clergyman, activist
- Known for: Civil rights movement; Peace movement; Closest friend and mentor of Martin Luther King Jr.

Military service
- Branch/service: United States Army
- Rank: Platoon sergeant
- Battles/wars: World War II

Ralph David Abernathy Sr. (/ˈæbərnæθi/; March 11, 1926 – April 17, 1990) was an American civil rights activist and Baptist minister. He was ordained in the Baptist tradition in 1948. Being a leader of the civil rights movement, Abernathy was a close friend and mentor of Martin Luther King Jr. and collaborated with him and E. D. Nixon to create the Montgomery Improvement Association, which led and co-created the Montgomery bus boycott and was an executive board member of the Southern Christian Leadership Conference (SCLC). Abernathy became president of the SCLC following the assassination of King in 1968 and led the Poor People's Campaign in Washington, D.C., in addition to other marches and demonstrations for disenfranchised Americans. He also served as an advisory committee member of the Congress on Racial Equality (CORE).

In 1971, Abernathy addressed the United Nations, speaking about world peace. He also assisted in brokering a deal between the FBI and American Indian Movement protesters during the Wounded Knee incident of 1973. Abernathy retired from his position as president of the SCLC in 1977 and became president emeritus. Later that year, he unsuccessfully ran for the U.S. House of Representatives for the 5th district of Georgia. Abernathy later founded the Foundation for Economic Enterprises Development (FEED), and he testified before the U.S. Congress in support of extending the Voting Rights Act in 1982.

In 1989, Abernathy wrote And the Walls Came Tumbling Down, a controversial autobiography about his and King's involvement in the civil rights movement. Abernathy eventually became less active in politics and returned to his work as a minister. Abernathy died of heart disease on April 17, 1990. His tombstone is engraved with the words "I tried."

== Early life, family, and education ==
Abernathy, the 10th of William L. and Louivery Valentine Abernathy (née Bell)'s 12 children, was born on March 11, 1926, on their 500-acre (200 ha) family farm in Linden, Alabama. William was the first Black American to vote in Marengo County, Alabama, and the first to serve on a grand jury there. Abernathy attended Linden Academy (a Baptist school founded by the First Mt. Pleasant District Association). At Linden Academy, he led his first demonstrations to improve the livelihoods of his fellow students.

During World War II, Abernathy enlisted in the United States Army advancing in rank becoming platoon sergeant before being discharged. Afterwards, he enrolled at Alabama State University using the benefits from the G.I. Bill, which he earned with his service. As a sophomore, Abernathy was elected president of the student council, and led a successful hunger strike to raise the quality of the food served on the campus. While still a college student, he announced his call to the ministry, which Abernathy had envisioned since he was a small boy growing up in a devout Baptist family. Abernathy was ordained a Baptist minister in 1948 and preached his first sermon on Mother's Day (in honor of his recently deceased mother). Two years later, Abernathy graduated with a bachelor's degree in mathematics. During the summer of 1950, he hosted a radio show and became the first African-American disc jockey on a white radio station in Montgomery, Alabama. In the fall, Abernathy went to Atlanta University earning a Master of Arts degree in sociology with high honors in 1951. While enrolled at Alabama State, he pledged becoming an initiated brother of Kappa Alpha Psi fraternity.

Abernathy began his professional career in 1951, when he was appointed as the dean of men at Alabama State University. Later that year, Abernathy became the senior pastor of the First Baptist Church, the largest Black church in Montgomery; he held the position for 10 years.

Abernathy married Juanita Odessa Jones of Uniontown, Alabama, on August 31, 1952. They had five children: Ralph David Abernathy Jr., Juandalynn Ralpheda, Donzaleigh Avis, Ralph David Abernathy III, and Kwame Luthuli Abernathy. Their first child, Ralph Jr., died suddenly on August 18, 1953, less than two days after his birth on August 16, while their other children lived on to adulthood. His grandson, Micah Abernathy, is currently an American football player for the Atlanta Falcons.

In 1954, Abernathy met Martin Luther King Jr., who was at that time becoming a pastor himself at a nearby church. Abernathy mentored King and they eventually became close friends.

== Civil rights activism ==
=== Montgomery bus boycott ===
External videos
- “Interview with Reverend Ralph Abernathy” from Eyes on the Prize conducted in 1985 discusses his involvement in helping to organize the Montgomery Bus Boycott.

After the arrest of Rosa Parks on December 1, 1955, for refusing to give up her seat on a bus to a white man, Abernathy, then a member of the Montgomery NAACP, collaborated with King to create the Montgomery Improvement Association, which organized the Montgomery bus boycott. Along with fellow English professor Jo Ann Robinson, they called for and distributed flyers asking the black citizens of Montgomery to stay off the buses. The boycott attracted national attention, and a federal court case that ended on December 17, 1956, when the U.S. Supreme Court, in Browder v. Gayle, upheld an earlier District Court decision that the bus segregation was unconstitutional. The 381-day transit boycott, challenging the "Jim Crow" segregation laws, had been successful. And on December 20, 1956, the boycott came to an end.

After the boycotts, Abernathy's home and church were bombed. His family were barely able to escape their home, but they were unharmed. Abernathy's church, Mt. Olive Church, Bell Street Church, and the home of Robert Graetz were also bombed on that evening, while King, Abernathy, and 58 other black leaders from the south were meeting at the Southern Negro Leaders Conference on Transportation and Nonviolent Integration, in Atlanta.

=== Southern Christian Leadership Conference and support of Freedom Riders ===
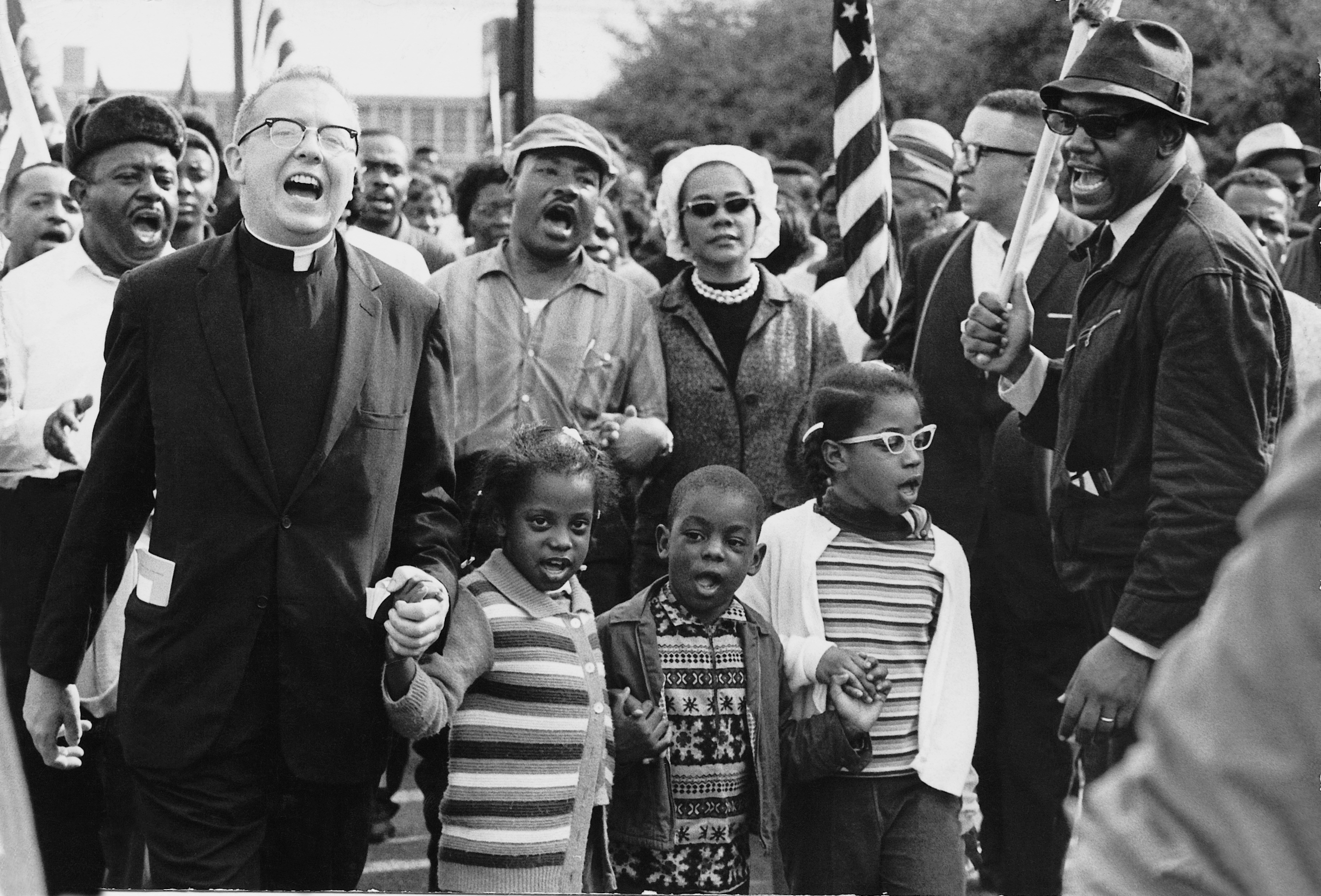
Abernathy and his wife Juanita Abernathy with Dr. Martin Luther King Jr. and his wife Coretta Scott King. James Reeb and the Abernathy children are shown in the front line, leading the Selma to Montgomery March in 1965.

On January 11, 1957, after a two-day-long meeting, the Southern Leaders Conference on Transportation and Non-violent Integration was founded. On February 14, 1957, the conference convened again in New Orleans. During that meeting, they changed the group's name to the Southern Leadership Conference and appointed the following executive board: King, president; Charles Kenzie Steele, vice president; Abernathy, financial secretary-treasurer; T. J. Jemison, secretary; I. M. Augustine, general counsel. On August 8, 1957, the Southern Leadership Conference held its first convention, in Montgomery. They changed the conference's name a final time to the Southern Christian Leadership Conference, and decided to start voter registration drives for Black people across the south.

On May 20, 1961, the Freedom Riders stopped in Montgomery while on their way from Washington, D.C., to New Orleans to protest the still segregated buses across the south. Many of the Freedom Riders were beaten by a white mob once they arrived at the Montgomery bus station, causing several of the riders to be hospitalized. The following night Abernathy and King set up an event in support of the Freedom Riders, where King would make an address, at Abernathy's church. More than 1,500 people came to the event that night. The church was soon surrounded by a mob of white segregationists who laid siege on the church. King, from inside the church, called the Attorney General Robert F. Kennedy, and pleaded for help from the federal government. There was a group of United States Marshals sent there to protect the event, but they were too few in number to protect the church from the angry mob, who had begun throwing rocks and bricks through the windows of the church. Reinforcements with riot experience, from the Marshals service, were sent in to help defend the perimeter. By the next morning, the Governor of Alabama, after being called by Kennedy, sent in the Alabama National Guard, and the mob was finally dispersed. After the success of the Freedom Riders in Montgomery, Birmingham, and Huntsville, Alabama in 1961, King insisted that Abernathy assume the pastorate of the West Hunter Street Baptist Church in Atlanta; Abernathy moved his family from Montgomery becoming the pastor in 1962.

The King/Abernathy partnership spearheaded successful nonviolent movements in Montgomery; Albany, Georgia; Birmingham, Mississippi, Washington D.C., Selma, Alabama; St. Augustine, Florida; Chicago, and Memphis. King and Abernathy journeyed together, often sharing the same hotel rooms, and leisure times with their wives, children, family, and friends. And they were both jailed 17 times together, for their involvement in the movement.

=== During Martin Luther King Jr.'s assassination ===
On April 3, 1968, at the Mason Temple, Abernathy introduced King before he made his last public address; King said at the beginning of his now famous "I've Been to the Mountaintop" speech:

As I listened to Ralph Abernathy and his eloquent and generous introduction and then thought about myself, I wondered who he was talking about. It's always good to have your closest friend and associate to say something good about you, and Ralph Abernathy is the best friend that I have in the world.

The following day, April 4, 1968, Abernathy was with King in the room (Room 306) they shared at the Lorraine Motel in Memphis. At 6:01 p.m. while Abernathy was inside the room getting cologne, King was shot while standing outside on the balcony. Once the shot was fired, Abernathy ran out to the balcony and cradled King in his arms as he lay unconscious. Abernathy accompanied King to St. Joseph's Hospital within 15 minutes of the shooting. The doctors performed an emergency surgery, but King never regained consciousness and was pronounced dead at 7:05 p.m. at age 39.

== Leadership of the Southern Christian Leadership Conference ==
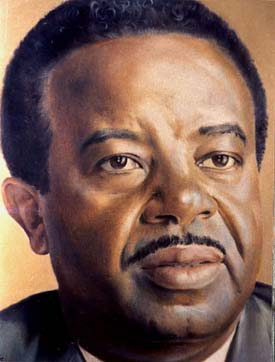
Abernathy as painted by the artist Robert Templeton, oil, 1974

Until King's assassination, Abernathy had served as Southern Christian Leadership Conference's first Financial Secretary/Treasurer and Vice President At-Large. After King's death, Abernathy assumed the presidency of the SCLC. One of his first roles was to take up the role of leading a march to support striking sanitation workers in Memphis which King and Abernathy had planned to attend before King's assassination. In May 1968, Abernathy led the Poor People's Campaign in Washington, D.C.

=== Protest at NASA ===
On the eve of the launch of Apollo 11, on July 15, 1969, Abernathy arrived at Cape Kennedy with several hundred members of the poor people campaign to protest against the spending by government on space exploration, while many Americans remained poor. He was met by Thomas O. Paine, the administrator of NASA, whom he told that in the face of such suffering, space flight represented an inhuman priority and funds should be spent instead to "feed the hungry, clothe the naked, tend the sick, and house the homeless". Paine told Abernathy that the advances in space exploration were "child's play" compared to the "tremendously difficult human problems" of society Abernathy was discussing. Despite protesting against the launch, Abernathy acknowledged that he was "profoundly moved by the nation's achievements in space and the heroism of the three men embarking for the moon", but added that "What we can do for space and exploration we demand that we do for starving people."

=== Charleston hospital workers movement ===
In 1969, Abernathy also took part in a labor struggle in Charleston, South Carolina, on behalf of the hospital workers of the local union 1199B, which led to a living wage increase and improved working conditions for thousands of hospital workers.

=== Wounded Knee ===
In 1973, Abernathy helped negotiate a peace settlement at the Wounded Knee uprising between the Federal Bureau of Investigation and the leaders of the American Indian Movement, Russell Means and Dennis Banks.

Abernathy remained president of the SCLC for nine years following King's death in 1968. After King's death the organization lost the popularity it had under his leadership. By the time Abernathy left the organization, the SCLC had become indebted, and critics stated that it was not as imaginative as the SCLC led by Dr. King. In 1977, Abernathy resigned from his leadership role at the SCLC, and was bestowed the title president emeritus.

== Political career and later activism ==
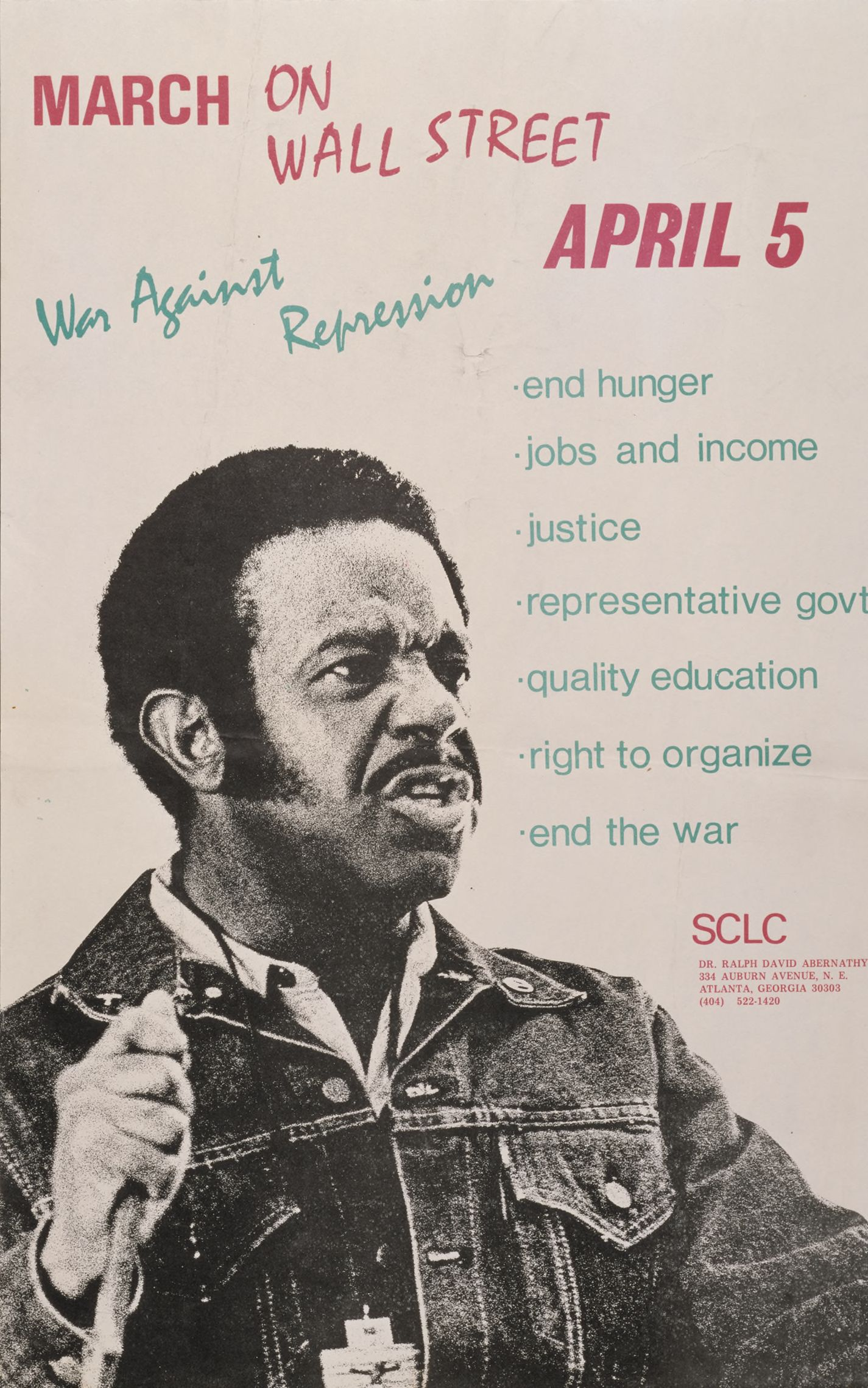
A poster issued by the Southern Christian Leadership Conference, featuring Abernathy, advertising a march on Wall Street planned for April 5, 1971

Abernathy addressed the United Nations in 1971; he spoke about world peace. Abernathy was also a member of the board of directors of the Martin Luther King Jr. Center for Nonviolent Social Change. In 1977, he ran unsuccessfully for Georgia's 5th congressional district seat, losing to Congressman Wyche Fowler. Abernathy founded the nonprofit organization Foundation for Economic Enterprises Development (FEED), which offered managerial and technical training, creating jobs, income, business and trade opportunities for underemployed and unemployed workers for underprivileged Black-Americans.

In 1979, Abernathy endorsed Senator Edward M. Kennedy's candidacy for the Presidency of the United States. However, Abernathy shocked critics a few weeks before the 1980 November election, when he endorsed the front-runner, Ronald Reagan, over the struggling presidential campaign of Jimmy Carter. Abernathy stated of his endorsement: "The Republican Party has too long ignored us and the Democratic Party has taken us for granted and so since all of my colleagues and the latter in various places across the country were supporting the Democratic Party, I felt that I should support Ronald Reagan." Abernathy withdrew his endorsement of Reagan in 1984, citing his disappointment with the Reagan Administration on civil rights and other areas.

In 1982, Abernathy testified—along with his executive associate, James Peterson of Berkeley, California—before the Congressional Hearings calling for the Extension of the Voting Rights Act.

External videos
- Booknotes interview with Abernathy on And the Walls Came Tumbling Down, October 29, 1989, C-SPAN

Documents declassified in 2017 show that Abernathy was on the National Security Agency watchlist because of FBI leadership's hatred of the civil rights movement.

=== And the Walls Came Tumbling Down ===
In late 1989, HarperCollins published Abernathy's autobiography, And the Walls Came Tumbling Down. It was his final published accounting of his close partnership with King and their work in the civil rights movement. In it, Abernathy revealed King's marital infidelity, stating that King had sexual relations with two women on the night of April 3, 1968 (after his "I've Been to the Mountaintop" speech earlier that day). The book's revelations became the source of much controversy, as did Abernathy. Jesse Jackson and other civil rights activists made a statement in October 1989—after the book's release—that the book was "slander" and that "brain surgery" must have altered Abernathy's perception.

=== Unification Church ===
In the 1980s, the Unification Church hired Abernathy as a spokesperson to protest the news media's use of the term "Moonies", which they compared with the word "nigger". Abernathy also served as vice president of the Unification Church–affiliated group American Freedom Coalition, and served on two Unification Church boards of directors.

== Death ==
Abernathy died at Emory Crawford Long Memorial Hospital on the morning of April 17, 1990, from two blood clots that traveled to his heart and lungs; Abernathy was only 64 years old. After his death, George H. W. Bush, then the president of the United States, issued the following statement:

Barbara and I join with all Americans to mourn the passing of the Rev. Ralph Abernathy, a great leader in the struggle for civil rights for all Americans and a tireless campaigner for justice.

Abernathy is entombed in the Chapel Mausoleum of Lincoln Cemetery in Atlanta. At his behest, Abernathy's tomb has the simple inscription: "I TRIED."

== Tributes and portrayals ==
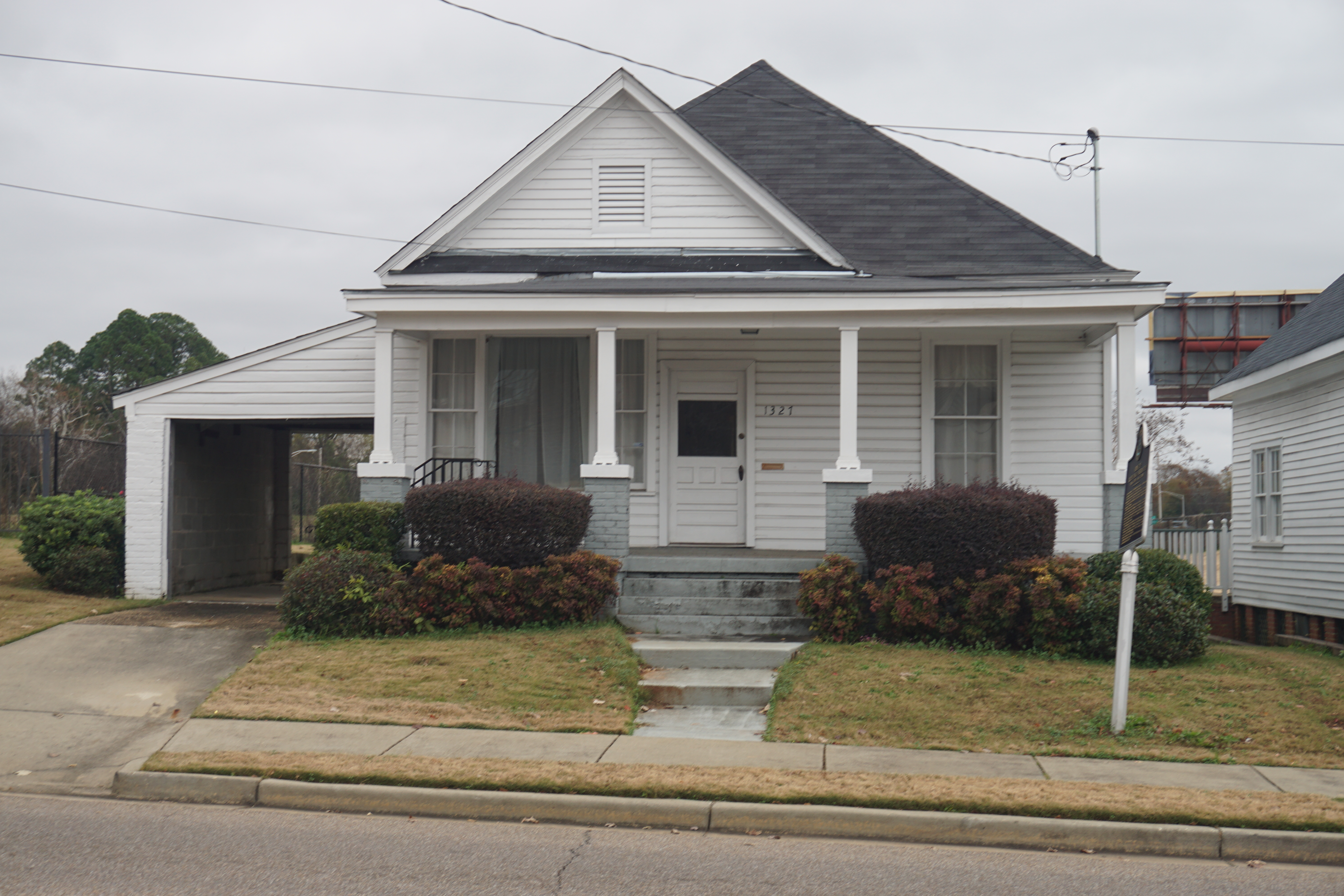
Ralph David Abernathy Home on the campus of Alabama State University in Montgomery

During his lifetime, Abernathy was honored with more than 300 awards and citations, including five honorary doctoral degrees. He received a Doctor of Divinity from Morehouse College, a Doctor of Divinity from Kalamazoo College in Michigan, a Doctor of Laws from Allen University of South Carolina, a Doctor of Laws from Long Island University in New York, and a Doctor of Laws from Alabama State University.

- Ralph D. Abernathy Hall at Alabama State University is dedicated to him, with a bust of his head in the foyer area.
- Interstate 20 Ralph David Abernathy Freeway, Abernathy Road, and Ralph David Abernathy Boulevard of Atlanta were named in his honor.

Abernathy was portrayed by Ernie Lee Banks in the 1978 miniseries King. He was also portrayed by Terrence Howard in the 2001 HBO film Boycott, Colman Domingo in the 2014 film Selma, and Dohn Norwood in the 2016 film All the Way. Hubert Point-Du Jour also portrayed Abernathy in Genius.

== Works ==
- Abernathy, Ralph (August 1958). The Natural History of a Social Movement: The Montgomery Improvement Association (M.A. thesis). Atlanta: Department of Sociology, Atlanta University.
- Abernathy, Ralph (2010) [1989]. And the Walls Came Tumbling Down (Unabridged ed.). Chicago: Lawrence Hill Books. ISBN 9781569762790. OCLC 460058436.

== See also ==
- List of civil rights leaders
- Timeline of the civil rights movement
