= Mother Pollard =

American civil rights activist

"Mother" Pollard (c. 1882–1885 – before 1963) was an American church elder who participated in the 1955–1956 Montgomery bus boycott. She has been called a civil rights hero for her tenacity in soothing the spirit of her pastor, Martin Luther King Jr.

Pollard was an elder of the Dexter Avenue Baptist Church in Montgomery, Alabama, during the time of the bus boycott. It was a seminal event in the civil rights movement that produced a political and social protest campaign against the policy of racial segregation on the public transit system in Montgomery. King recounted in his writings that after several weeks of walking to her destinations rather than take the bus, he suggested to Mother Pollard, then about 72, that she might take the bus again for the sake of her health. She replied, "My feets is tired, but my soul is rested."

Mother Pollard told Dr. King
"God's Gonna Take Care of You"

I have been tortured without and tormented within by the raging fires of tribulation ... I have been forced to muster what strength and courage I have to withstand howling winds of pain and jostling storms of adversity. But as the years have unfolded the eloquently simple words of Mother Pollard have come back again and again to give light and peace and guidance to my troubled soul, "God's gonna take care of you".

— Martin Luther King Jr.

She was dubbed "Mother" because of her age; her real first name is unknown.
