= Thelma Glass =

American activist and professor (1916–2012)

- Thelma Glass
- Born: Thelma McWilliams; May 16, 1916; Mobile, Alabama, U.S.
- Died: July 24, 2012 (aged 96); Montgomery, Alabama, U.S.
- Education: Alabama State University, Columbia University
- Occupation: Geography professor
- Employer: Alabama State University
- Known for: Co-organizer of Montgomery bus boycott
- Spouse: Arthur Glass

Thelma Glass (May 16, 1916 – July 24, 2012) was an American civil rights activist, noted for helping to organize the Montgomery bus boycott of 1955, and a professor of geography at Alabama State University. She was also an advocate for geography education in Black educational systems.

== Early life ==
Glass was born Thelma McWilliams in Mobile, Alabama, to a hotel cook and homemaker. She graduated from Dunbar High School (Mobile) and attended Alabama State University and Columbia University.

She married Arthur Glass, a geography professor at Alabama State University, in 1942. They did not have any children together. She also became a professor of geography at Alabama State University in 1947, joining the Women's Political Council shortly after.

== Work in the Civil Rights Movement ==
In 1955, after Rosa Parks' arrest, Glass and the other members of the Women's Political Council, called for a protest against the Montgomery bus system, thus beginning the Montgomery bus boycott, a key action in the Civil Rights Movement. Glass was appointed secretary of the organization in 1955. The Rev. Dr. Martin Luther King Jr. and Ralph Abernathy joined in the protests as well and worked with her. She helped create some 35,000 flyers to alert the community of the boycott and urge them to walk or car-pool. Soon she noticed every bus that went by was empty of passengers. Although there was sometimes violent retaliation, the boycott continued until December 20, 1956, when the Supreme Court ruled in Browder v. Gayle that segregation on buses was unconstitutional.

== Civil rights case against Montgomery Sheriff's Department ==
In 1987, Glass filed a civil rights case against the Montgomery, Alabama Sheriff's Department for alleged harassment against her based on her race. This came 32 years after her involvement in organizing the Montgomery bus boycott with the Women's Political Council.

Glass, around 70 years old at the time, was a passenger in a car with two unnamed senior citizens. An Alabama State Trooper pulled the car over for speeding, although Glass claims in her report that the car had not been going over the speed limit. The police officer asked the driver to exit the vehicle, and Glass exited the passenger seat. The officer then is claimed to have pointed his weapon at her, ordering her to reenter the vehicle. After issuing a ticket to the driver, the officer departed.

Glass claimed that her civil rights were violated and that the traffic stop was an act of harassment against her and the other people traveling with her. The Federal Bureau of Investigation looked into the case, as well as the Montgomery County Sherriff's Office. The final decision on the case by the FBI's Civil Rights Division was that there was no clear evidence of a civil rights violation.

== Other work and later life ==
Glass conducted local and regional research in many fields of geography, including economic, cultural, and physical. Glass does not have much of this work published, but she used her research to advocate for geography education. After the Civil Rights Movement, she utilized her activism and career to visit senior high schools in Black communities across the state of Alabama and educate students on geography and emphasize the need for adequate programs in their schools. She retired from being a professor in 1981.

Glass received Alabama State University's Black and Gold Standard Award in 2011 for her notability and contributions to the university. She also had an auditorium named after and dedicated to her on the university's campus.

Glass died at the age of 96 on July 24, 2012, in Montgomery, Alabama.
