= Georgia Gilmore =

American civil rights activist

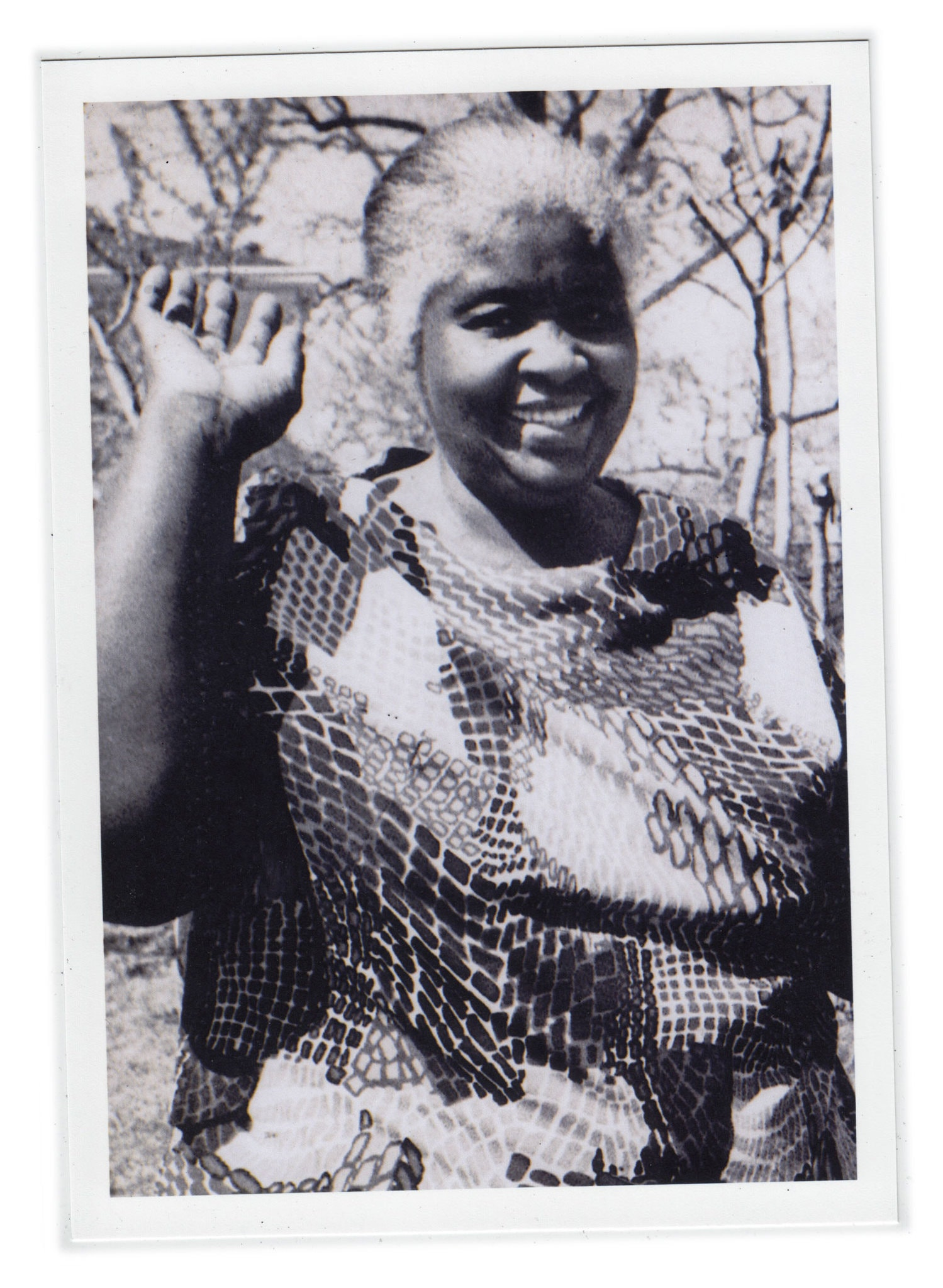
- Georgia Gilmore waving, photo taken January 1978
- Born: February 5, 1920; Montgomery County, Alabama
- Died: March 9, 1990 (aged 70)
- Occupation: Cook
- Known for: Montgomery bus boycott and fundraising through The Club from Nowhere

Georgia Theresa Gilmore (February 5, 1920 – March 7, 1990) was an American civil rights activist from Montgomery, Alabama, who participated in the Montgomery bus boycott through her fund-raising organization, the club from Nowhere, which sold food at Montgomery Improvement Association (MIA) mass meetings. Her grass-roots activism helped sustain the 382-day boycott and inspired similar groups to begin raising money for the boycott.

== Background ==
Georgia Gilmore was born in Montgomery County, Alabama on February 5, 1920. She was one of five children born to Janie Gilmore. As a child, she attended a parochial school run by nuns at St. John the Baptist Catholic church. Throughout the course of her life, Gilmore worked as a midwife, a cook, a domestic worker, and she worked on the railroad. She lived in Montgomery with her six children, and during the 1950s, she supported her mother and helped raise her youngest sister and a niece. Known as a kind and motherly woman with incredible cooking skills, Gilmore had a bold personality and resisted the racial injustices common in Alabama during the 1950s. She was also a member of the local NAACP in Montgomery, where she worked with Rosa Parks and other NAACP workers to protest the discriminatory treatment African Americans experienced in Alabama. Before the start of the Montgomery bus boycott, Gilmore decided to stop riding city buses after she and her mother experienced discrimination on the bus. She was not afraid to confront white men and was fiercely protective of her family. Gilmore worked as a cook at the National Lunch Company, a restaurant, in downtown Montgomery in the 1950s.

== Bus Boycott and Gilmore's activism ==
External videos
- "Interview with Georgia Teresa Gilmore" conducted for Eyes on the Prize in 1986 discusses the Montgomery Bus Boycott.
- "Interview with Georgia Teresa Gilmore" conducted for America, They Loved You Madly, a precursor to Eyes on the Prize in 1979 discusses the Montgomery Bus Boycott.

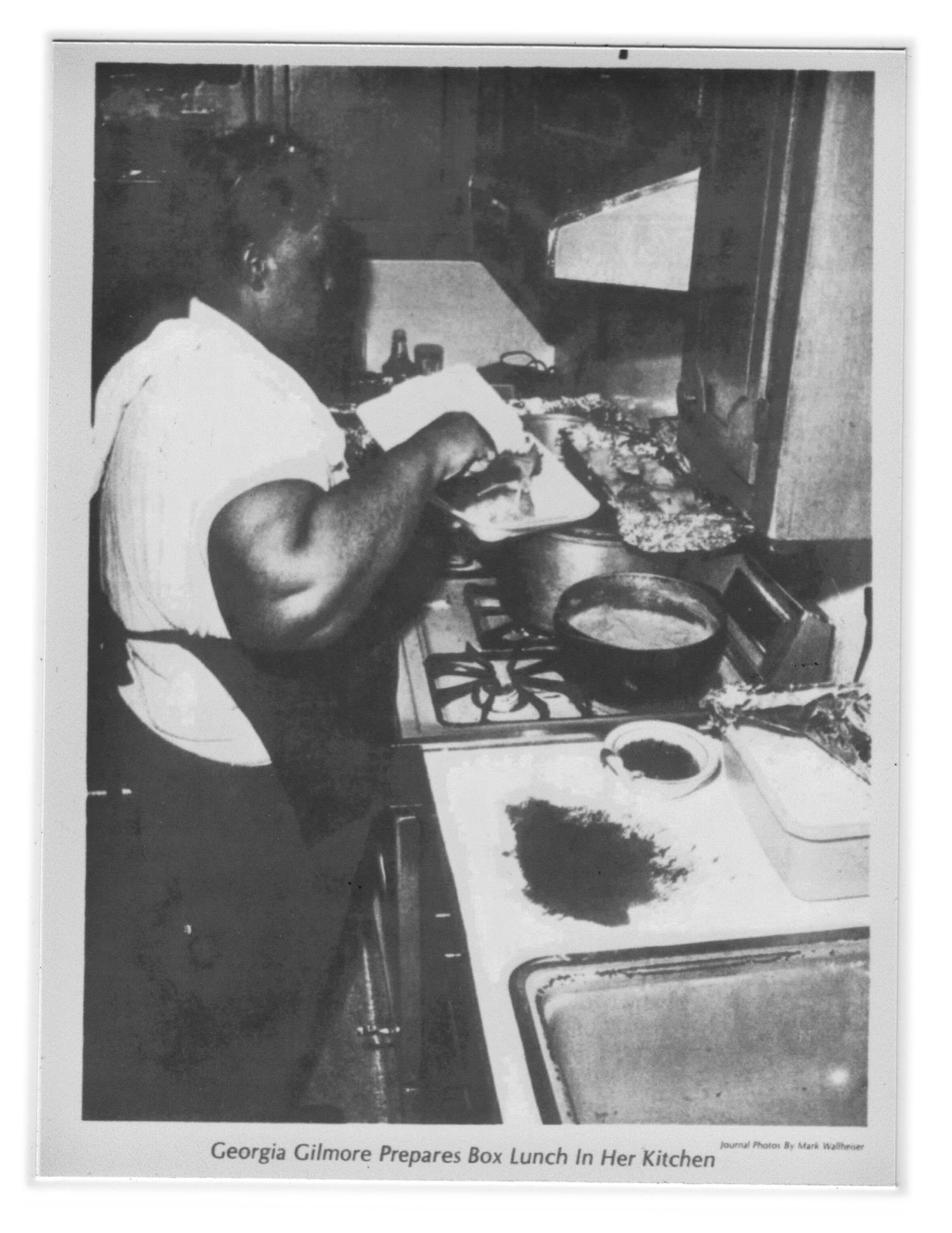
Georgia Gilmore in her kitchen making a box lunch. She used her culinary skills to support the Montgomery bus boycott.

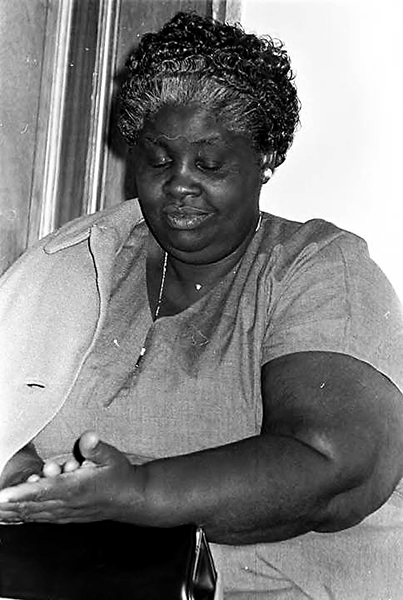
Georgia Gilmore seated in the audience at Holt Street Baptist Church.

After Rosa Parks was arrested for refusing to leave her seat on December 1, 1955, the Women's Political Council declared a boycott of the bus system beginning on December 5. A group of civic leaders and ministers formed the Montgomery Improvement Association (MIA) to help guide the boycott. Gilmore, who had already refused to use the buses in Montgomery, heard of the arrest on the news and announcements of the first MIA mass meeting to be held at Holt Street Baptist church on the evening of the boycott. Gilmore introduced herself to the Martin Luther King Jr., the president of the MIA, and joined the organization that night.

Gilmore and her friends started a fundraising group called the club from Nowhere to help support the operations of the boycott and the MIA. Georgia Gilmore, along with others, testified about the discrimination they faced on city buses during the State of Alabama v. M. L. King, Jr. (1956). trial. Her testimony and involvement with the boycott led to her being fired from her job at the National Lunch Company. However, this did not stop Gilmore as she later said, "this new generation had decided that they just had taken as much as they could."

Following her dismissal from the National Lunch Company, Martin Luther King Jr. (who lived nearby) and other MIA leaders helped Gilmore set up her own restaurant in her home as a way for her to make a living. Though not a licensed restaurant, Gilmore's place became a spot where Dr. King and other members of the MIA could go to eat, congregate, and strategize.

=== Club from Nowhere ===
Gilmore started the club from Nowhere at the first mass meeting on December 5. She and her friends started selling fried chicken sandwiches in the parking lot and on the front steps of the church. The women kept selling sandwiches at mass meetings until they officially formed a fundraising group called the club from Nowhere. The success of this venture led Gilmore and her friends to produce entire meals, including chicken dinners, cakes, and pies to sell to the boycotters. The women sold on the east and west side of Montgomery, and had white clientele that knowingly and unknowingly bought food from them.

The money from these sales went toward helping the Montgomery Improvement Association and to sustain the carpool system, a backbone of the MIA's strategy to sustain the boycott. Gilmore dubbed her group "the Club from Nowhere" to ensure the anonymity of the members as well as contributors (some of whom were known as white). In an effort to avoid any conflict, Gilmore established herself as the only officer in the club from Nowhere. Members gave her all the money they made, and she donated the money to the MIA at weekly mass meetings. The club soon began raising hundreds of dollars a week by selling their meals out of beauty parlors, laundromats, and other locations frequented by both boycotters and supporters of the movement and they would present their weekly gains at the meetings to the applause of the audience. Gilmore hoped that the success of the group had encouraged other "ordinary folks" to do the same. This organization and others like it are cited by some as what kept the boycott alive by providing money as well as grass-roots support within the community.

=== Significance ===
Gilmore and the club from Nowhere showed how extensively African-American women aided the bus boycott, both in their financial contributions and in their commitment to the boycott. The club prompted the creation of a sister organization the Friendly Club, started by Inez Ricks, that also helped fund-raising for the MIA. Her son Mark later stated that she had "elevated her day-to-day work—doing the cooking—into something greater." In a 1986 interview, Gilmore credited African-American women with being a driving force behind the boycott's success, saying, "you see they were maids, cooks. And they was the one that really and truly kept the bus running."

== Gilmore v. City of Montgomery (1959 and 1974) ==
=== 1959 ===
In 1957, Georgia Gilmore's son Mark was arrested and beaten by two white police officers while taking a shortcut through Oak Park, a park that was white-only at the time. African Americans had been prohibited by local ordinance from using public parks and recreational facilities. Gilmore was the lead plaintiff in Gilmore v. City of Montgomery (1959), which fought the charges her son received. Gilmore won the case on the basis that the ban was unconstitutional according to the Fourteenth Amendment. The court ruled against Montgomery's policy of segregated parks. The city initially responded by closing the public parks in defiance of the court case.

=== 1974 ===
In 1971, the case was reopened for continued litigation and argued to the Supreme Court. The City of Montgomery had reopened the public parks and recreational facilities in the early 1970s. The city had allowed private schools and the YMCA, which were still segregated, sole use of public parks and recreational facilities. Gilmore won the second case in 1974 on the basis that taxpayer's dollars were being used to fund the use of these public spaces by white-only private school's athletic programs.

== Aftermath ==
In May 1961, the Freedom Riders arrived at the Greyhound Station in Montgomery, Alabama. A mob attacked the young protestors, which resulted in several injuries. Georgia Gilmore sheltered several of these injured at her home until it was safe for them to leave. Gilmore also participated in the Eyes on the Prize documentary and her famous recipes still appear in cookbooks.

Georgia Gilmore died on March 7, 1990, while making food for the twenty-fifth anniversary of the Selma to Montgomery March.
