= Bake sale =

Fundraising activity

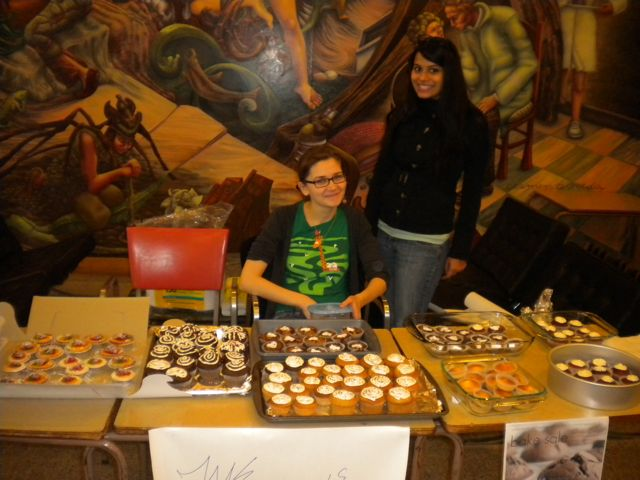
A bake sale stand in Canada

A bake sale, also known as a cake sale or cake stall, is a fundraising activity where baked goods such as doughnuts, cupcakes, muffins, cookies and brownies, sometimes along with other foods, are sold. Bake sales are usually held by small, non-profit organizations, such as clubs, school groups and charitable organizations. Bake sales are often set up around an area of pedestrian traffic, such as outside a grocery store or at a busy intersection near a mall.

Bake sales are also a popular means of fundraising within corporations and political organizations.

== History ==
The advent of bake sales dates back to the 1800s, during which time women used their domestic skills to fulfill expectations of charity. Since then, bake sales have been frequently used as a form of raising money for political or social causes.

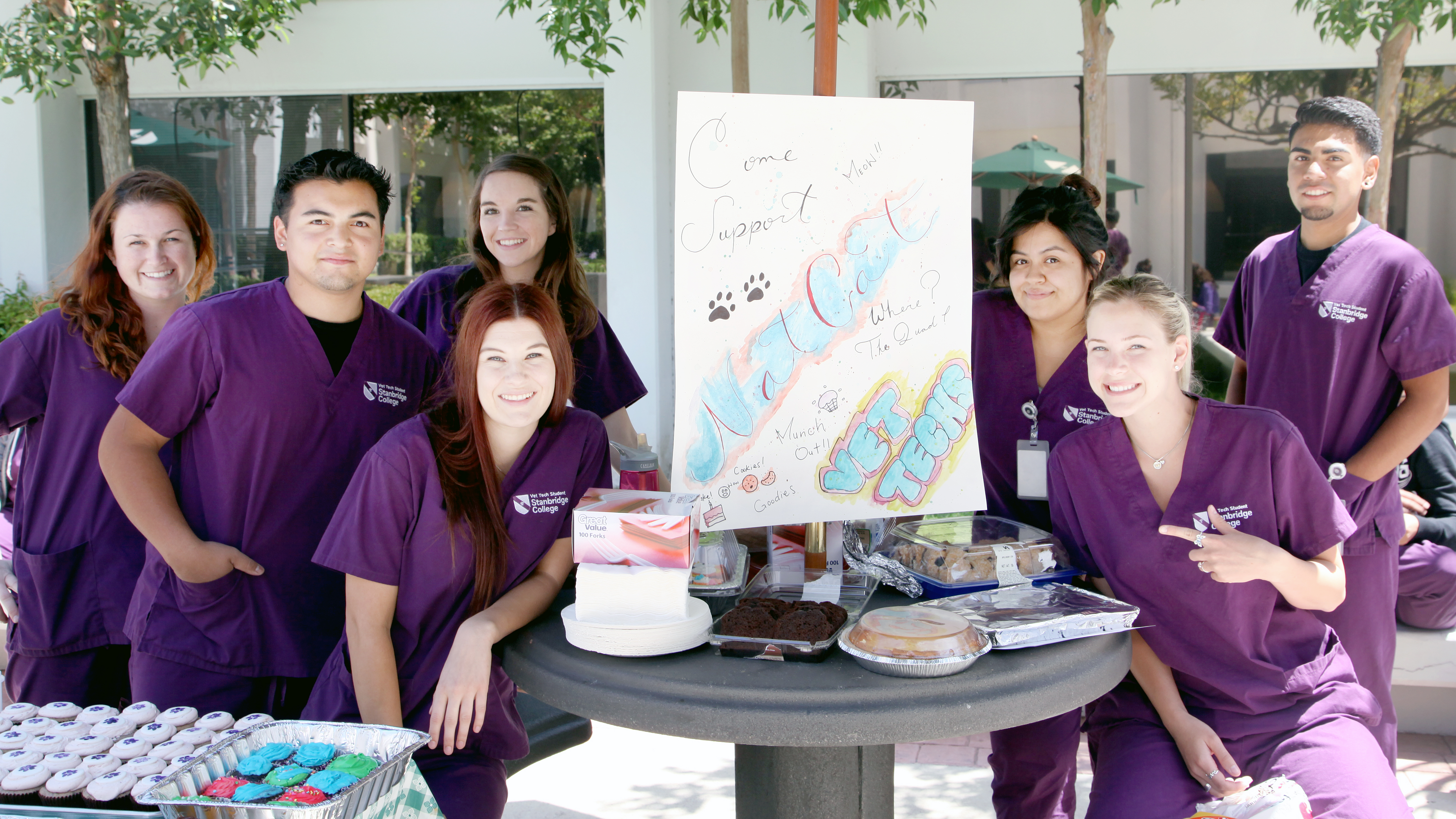
Fundraising bake sale in the US

In the early 1900s, suffragettes in Virginia used bake sales as a means to raise money to further the cause of women's suffrage. During the civil rights movement in the United States, Georgia Gilmore began a covert baking club that, in order to fund resistance efforts, sold savory meals and baked goods out of members' homes as well as in local establishments and at protest meetings.

In Australia, cake stalls and booths selling democracy sausages are common on election day, with a booth near about a third of polling stations. The tradition of hosting a bake sale near a polling station on election day was started no later than the 1920s.

In response to the murder of George Floyd in 2020, pastry chefs Willa Pelini, Paola Velez, and Rob Rubba organized a series of national bake sales that eventually became known as “Bakers Against Racism”. Originally intended as a singular event, the initiative attracted the participation of professional and hobbyist bakers across the country, each of whom contributed baked goods for various sales to raise money for organizations that support Black lives. Bakers Against Racism has since expanded efforts to help organizations working to end hate crimes against Asian Americans and people of Pacific Islander heritage.

== Conduct ==
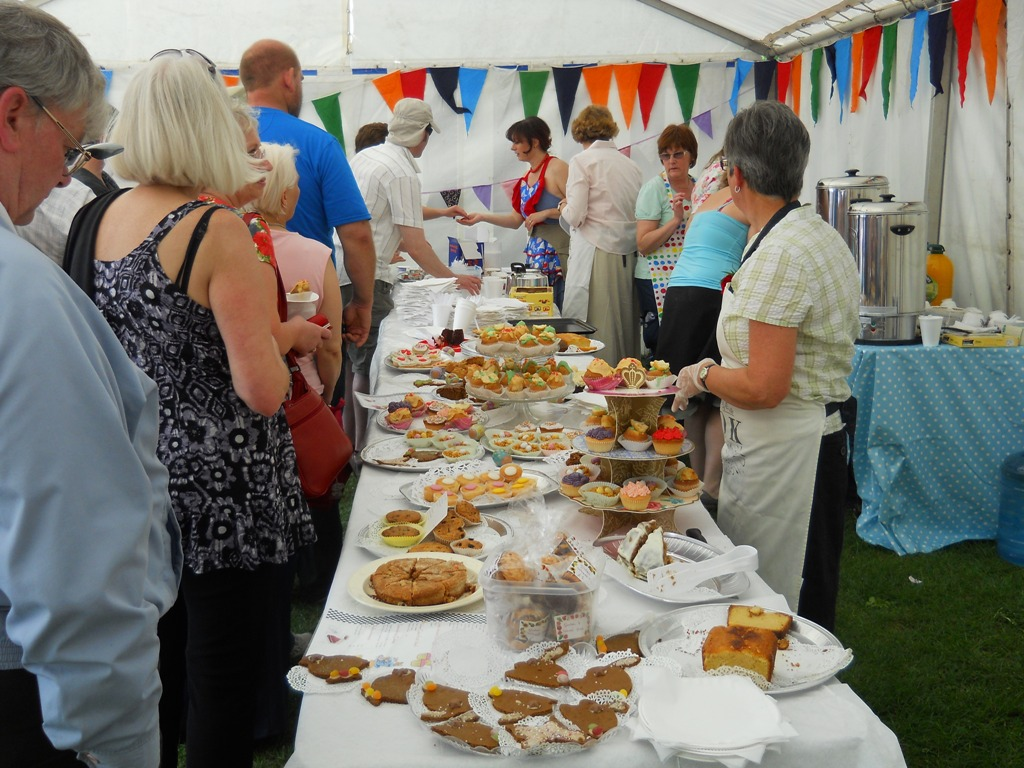
Cake stall St. George's Day in Britain

Bake sales are most often held to raise money for specific causes or for a particular organization, and frequently take place at schools or churches. Goods most commonly sold at bake sales include cookies, brownies, cupcakes, and muffins.
