= Maude Ballou =

American civil rights activist (1925–2019)

- Born: September 13, 1925; Fairhope, Alabama, United States
- Died: August 26, 2019 (aged 93); Ridgeland, Mississippi, United States
- Occupations: secretary to Martin Luther King Jr., teacher, university administrator
- Known for: civil rights activism

Maude Lerita Williams Ballou (September 13, 1925 – August 26, 2019) was an American civil rights activist. She and her husband were personal friends of Martin Luther King Jr. and she worked as King's secretary between 1955 and 1960.

== Early life ==
Maude Ballou was born in Fairhope, Alabama on September 13, 1925. Her mother was Mary Parker Williams and her father, a Baptist minister, was Reverend Hillary Parker Williams. She grew up in Mobile, Alabama and attended Southern University in Baton Rouge, Louisiana, graduating with a degree in business in 1947.

Maude married Leonard Ballou, a music instructor who was a friend and fraternity brother of Martin Luther King Jr. They moved to Montgomery, Alabama in 1952. There, Maude worked as program director at the first black radio station in Montgomery and Leonard taught music at Alabama State University. She and her husband frequently visited and hosted the Kings.

== Civil rights activism ==
After arriving in Montgomery, Ballou joined the Women's Political Council and worked with Jo Ann Robinson on civil rights issues.

Beginning in 1955, Ballou worked as Martin Luther King Jr.'s personal secretary. “I booked flights, research, writing. I did it all,” Ballou said of her work for King. Her work included editing early versions of King's iconic 1963 "I Have a Dream" speech, which King delivered at churches around the South.

In Stride Toward Freedom, King's 1958 account of the Montgomery bus boycott, he acknowledges that Ballou “continually encouraged me to persevere in this work.”

In 1957, Ballou was twenty-first on a list of "persons and churches most vulnerable to violent attacks” compiled by the Montgomery Improvement Association. She was threatened multiple times. In an interview with The Washington Post, she recounted an encounter in which a man “said the White Citizens’ Council had sent him down there to tell me to stop working for civil rights or they would get my children. And that's what got me, when you think about your babies. That really shook me. But it didn't stop me.”

She continued working with King after he re-located to Atlanta in 1960, and lived with the Kings for some time. Meanwhile, her husband and family moved to Petersburg, Virginia, where Leonard worked at Virginia State College. She re-joined them there in the summer of 1960.

David Garrow, a historian of the Civil Rights era, noted Ballou's pivotal role in King's work: "You look through the papers of the Montgomery period, and up to 85 percent of the signatures are in Maude’s hand. There’s no question that she’s running his life, that she’s the number one person he’s relying on to get the work done.”

== Personal life ==
Ballou and her husband had four children.

== Later life ==
Ballou later moved to North Carolina, where she worked for several decades as a middle and high school teacher and college administrator.
