= Lucille Times =

American civil rights activist (1921–2021)

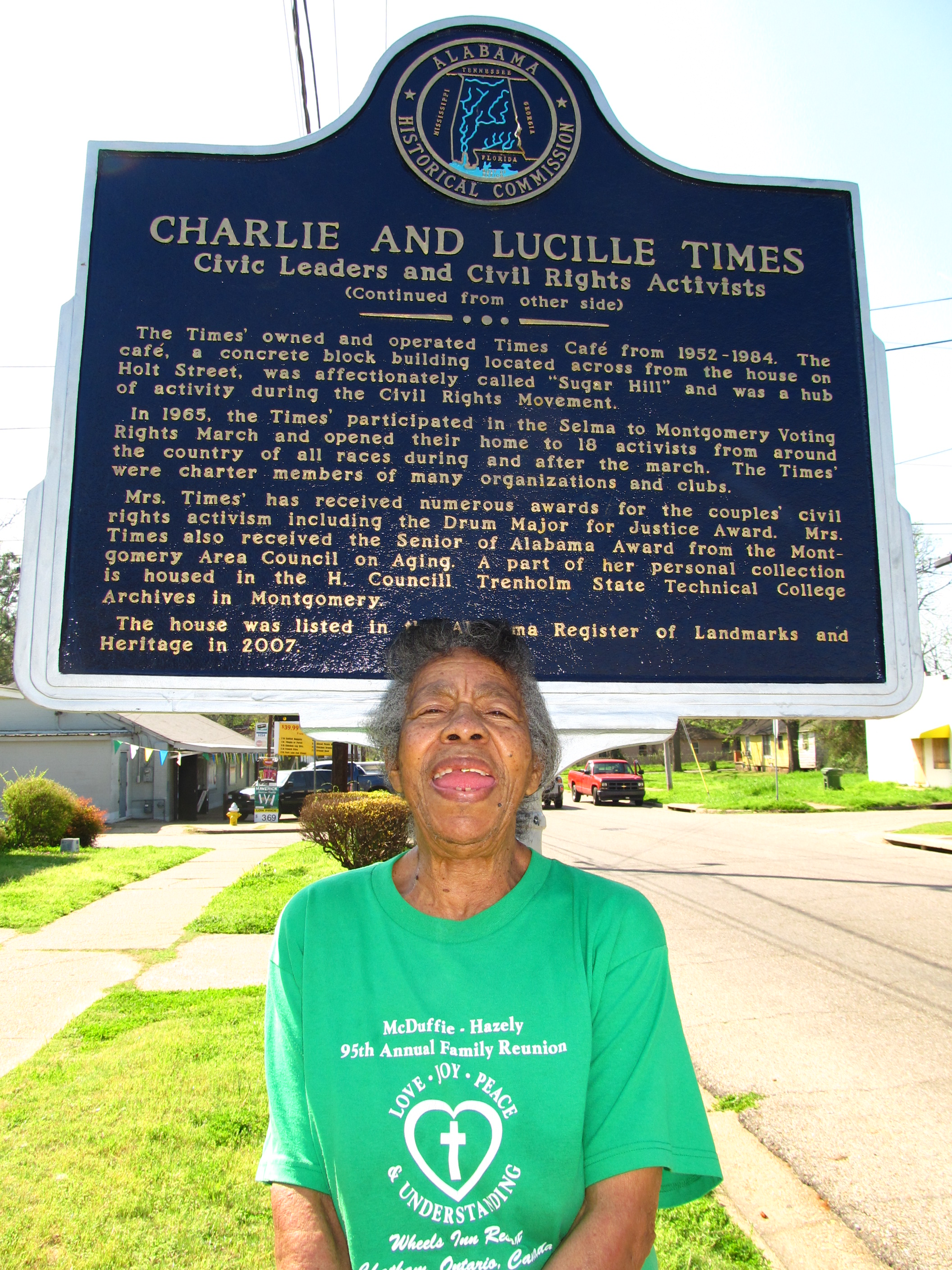
- Lucille with historical marker in front of her house (2012)
- Born: Lucille Sharp; April 22, 1921; Hope Hull, Alabama, U.S.
- Died: August 16, 2021 (aged 100); Montgomery, Alabama, U.S.
- Occupation: Cafe owner/operator
- Known for: Civil rights activism
- Spouse: Charlie Times (m. 1939; died 1978)

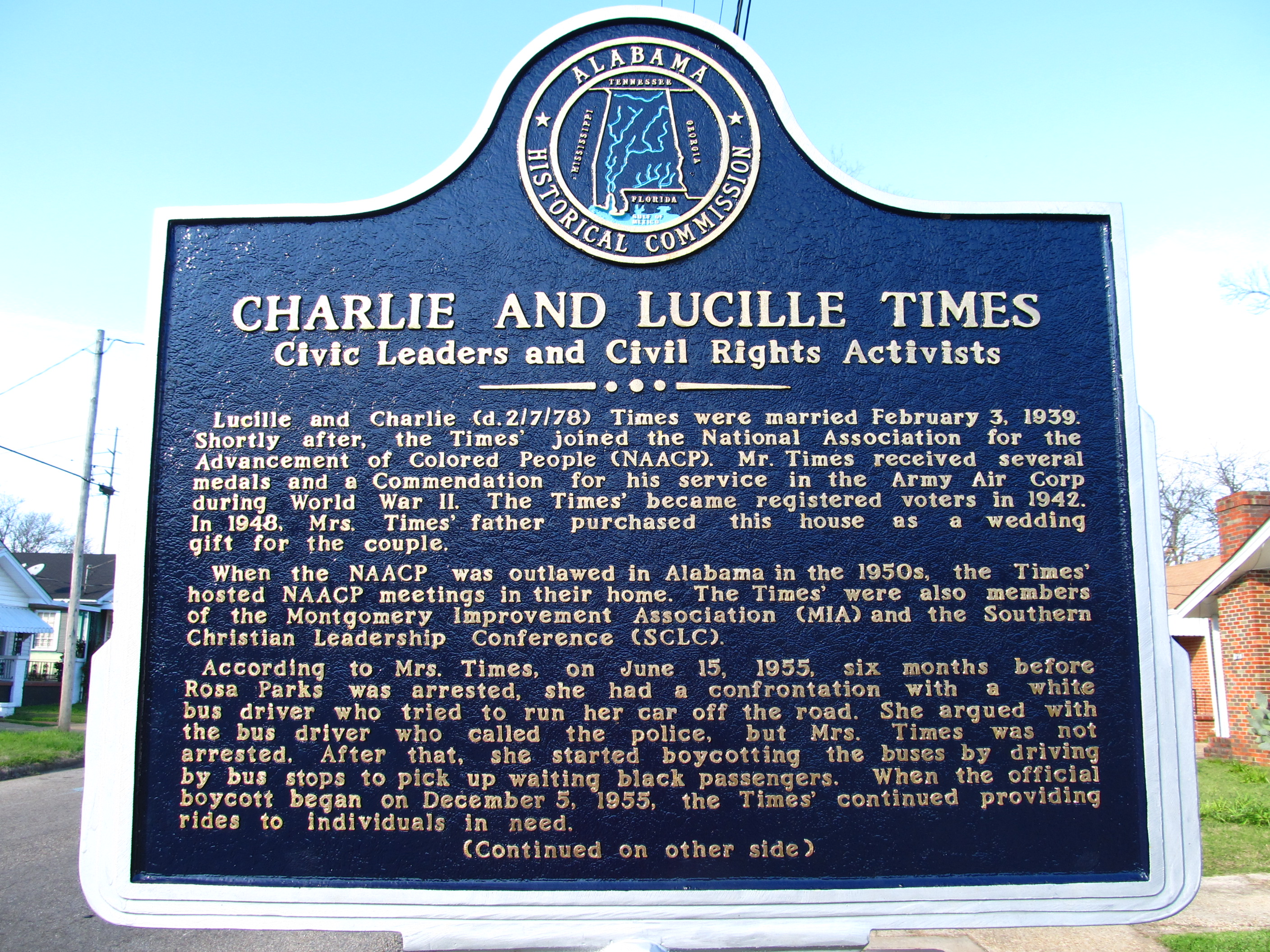
Front side of historical marker at Lucille Times South Holt Street House in Montgomery, Alabama.

Lucille Times (April 22, 1921 – August 16, 2021) was an American civil rights activist. She was active in the struggle for civil rights in Montgomery, Alabama throughout her adult life. Times worked for the cause at a time when the city was at the center of the national movement.

== Early life ==
Lucille was born on April 22, 1921, in Hope Hull, Alabama. Her mother died when Lucille was very young, and she was raised by her father, William Sharp, in a Christian home with six siblings. During her childhood years, the family lived in Chicago, Detroit, and Alabama. Mr. Sharp strongly imprinted two ideas on Lucille: the first, "You are no better than anyone else," and the second, "When you're right, don't back down."

Lucille married her husband, Charlie Times, on February 3, 1939. She and Charlie joined the NAACP shortly after marriage, and in 1950, when the NAACP was banned, the couple hosted meetings in their home, despite the danger. In 1950, both Lucille and her husband became registered voters. In 1952, they opened the Times Café (a.k.a. "Sugarhill") on Holt Street, which operated continuously until 1986.

== Activism ==
=== In Detroit ===
When Times lived in Detroit, she was part of a successful boycott of a butcher shop on 12th Street (later named Rosa Parks Blvd). The shop's proprietor sold some spoiled meat to a black man and refused to replace the meat or offer a refund. The neighborhood residents became indignant and refused to shop there, and the shop went out of business in less than a month.

=== Montgomery bus boycott ===
In a public conversation at the Rosa Parks Museum in 2017, Times recounted her story following her claim that she started the Montgomery bus boycott. On June 15, 1955, she drove her 1955 Buick Special to the cleaners on the Mobile Highway. On the way, the bus driver James F. Blake tried to force her car off the road three times. After she pulled into the cleaners' parking lot, Blake exited his bus and confronted her with, "You're a black son of a bitch!" Times responded with "you're a white son of a bitch!" and they immediately started physically fighting. Soon, two motorcycle policemen arrived to break them up. At that time, Times bit Blake's left biceps.

After splitting them up, one of the policemen talked to Blake separately and then approached Times angrily with "Do you know that was a white man you called a 'white son of a bitch'?" Times responded, "Do you know that I was a black woman that he called a 'black son of a bitch.'" The policeman became infuriated and shook his flashlight in Times' face and said, "If you were a man, I'd beat your head to jelly."

That night E. D. Nixon came to Times' Holt Street house, and Times told him the story. Nixon responded, "I cannot do anything about what happened off the bus; something's got to happen on the bus." Times' reply was, "I'm starting a boycott tomorrow!" Nixon said, "Wait until after Thanksgiving when the sales come on and we'll hit them in the pocket." Times repeated emphatically, "I'm starting a boycott tomorrow!"

The next day, Times began her boycott with her car. She drove people in her neighborhood to their destinations and would pick up people waiting at the bus stops. Her husband helped with his car, and they had a "donations" jar at the café where people made contributions for gasoline. The café became a de facto transportation hub, and people would call the café when they needed rides.

Twice during this time, Nixon brought A. Philip Randolph to Times' Holt Street house, and Times told him her story. During this time, Charlie Times began meeting secretly with Nixon at the café and planning for a large, organized boycott. Mr. Times even kept these meetings secret from his wife until after the big boycott started in December. Times continued driving people as she had been until the big boycott ended in December 1956.

== Death ==
Times died from COVID-19 on August 16, 2021 at the age of 100 and was funeralized at St Jude Catholic Church in Montgomery.
