= Lillie Mae Bradford =

American civil rights activist (1928–2017)

- Lillie Mae Bradford
- Born: October 1, 1928; Montgomery, Alabama, United States
- Died: March 14, 2017 (aged 88); Montgomery, Alabama, United States
- Resting place: Montgomery's Greenwood Serenity Memorial Gardens
- Occupation: Civil rights activist

Lillie Mae Bradford (October 1, 1928 – March 14, 2017) was an American civil rights activist who, four years before Rosa Parks's more publicized action, performed an act of civil disobedience on a city bus in Montgomery, Alabama, for which she was arrested, on a charge of disorderly conduct.

== Bradford's arrest, 1951 ==
Fingerprint section of the arrest report of civil rights pioneer Lillie Mae Bradford

Bradford's arrest report

On May 11, 1951, Bradford saw that the bus driver had punched her ticket for the wrong price, apparently "a costly and frequently recurring error if it was indeed an error". Bradford asked to be charged the correct price, and after being told twice to return to the back of the bus, she sat down in the front.

The 20-year-old was going home from her job caring for disabled white children. She had paid for a transfer on to another bus but, as often happened, the driver had punched it in the wrong place. If she did nothing about it she would have ended up paying for the mistake.

"I thought if I don't get up and start speaking for my rights, I never will. It was humiliating. It was not dignified," Ms Bradford said. "It was off limits to go up to the front of the bus but I went up there and I told him that my ticket hadn't been punched right. He said: 'Nigger, go to the back of the bus' and I said: 'I will, as soon as you give me the right transfer or give me my money back.' And then I took a seat in the white folks' section".

The driver never fixed the punch card and Bradford never left the front seat. She was arrested for disorderly conduct, booked, fingerprinted and paid a small fine.

She was held by police for disorderly conduct until a neighbor bailed her out. The arrest followed her throughout her life; she said it had prevented her several times from getting jobs she applied for. In 2006, she commented, "'There was always a box that said: Do you have a criminal record?' she recalled. 'I went for federal clerk positions, and I would pass the tests, but I wouldn't get the job. That's when I came to the conclusion that it was because I had a police record.'"

== Aftermath: pardon and Rosa Parks Act ==
On April 3, 2006, a proposal by Thad McClammy (a Democratic member of the Alabama House of Representatives) to offer a formal pardon to civil rights activists was expected to appear before the Alabama Senate. There was some resistance to it: some activists did not want to be pardoned since, they said, they never committed any crimes to begin with. The Rosa Parks Act was passed in April 2006, and allowed activists who had been arrested or their family members to request a pardon. In 2007, when similar legislation in Tennessee was making it through the legislature, Bradford's arrest was invoked again: "Bradford, a retired school custodian, knows that having her record cleared now won't have any real effect, but she wants to apply for a pardon certificate anyway. 'I want to have it removed, frame it, and put it on the wall,' Bradford said. 'It will show I was arrested fighting for my rights.'"

== Later life and death ==
Bradford lived in the Ridgecrest neighborhood of Montgomery with her sister Helen, and died in her sleep on March 14, 2017; she was buried at Montgomery's Greenwood Serenity Memorial Gardens, on March 22. She was described as a "pioneer" of the Civil Rights Movement.
