= Holt Street Baptist Church =

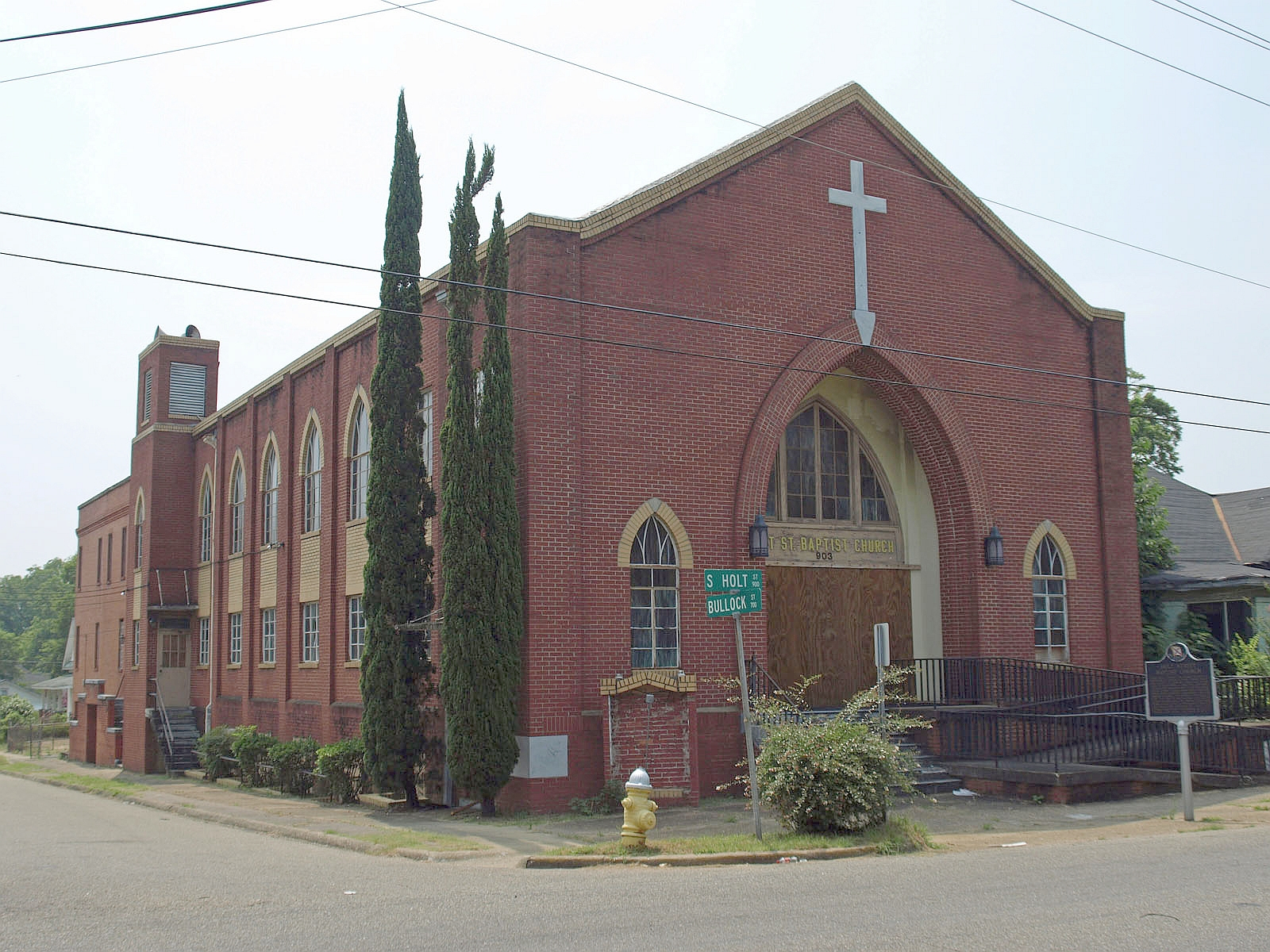
- Holt Street Baptist Church

- Location in Alabama
- 32°21′53″N 86°19′13″W
- Location: Montgomery, Alabama
- Country: United States
- Denomination: Baptist

History
- Status: Church
- Founded: 1909

Architecture
- Functional status: Museum renovations currently underway.
- Years built: 1913
- Closed: 1998
- Demolished

Alabama Register of Landmarks and Heritage
- Designated: May 26, 1986

The Holt Street Baptist Church is a historic Baptist church in Montgomery, Alabama, United States.

The church served as a meeting place for Montgomery's black community during the Montgomery bus boycott.

Built in 1913, the church closed in 1998, when the congregation moved to a new location in Montgomery.

== History ==
The Holt Street Baptist Church was established in 1909. The church building, located at the corner of Holt Street and Bullock Street, was completed in 1913. The first reverend was I.S. Fountain. From 1939 until 1952, Charles Kenzie Steele was pastor.

=== Montgomery bus boycott ===
On Thursday, December 1, 1955, Rosa Parks was arrested after refusing to give up her seat on a Montgomery bus to a white passenger. In response, the Women's Political Council, an African-American civil rights organization founded in Montgomery, organized a boycott of the city's buses by members of the black community.

A leaflet distributed to thousands of Montgomery's black citizens read: "don't ride the bus to work, to town, to school, or anyplace Monday, December 5". The final sentence read: "come to a mass meeting Monday at 7:00 pm at the Holt Street Baptist Church for further instructions". The boycott began the following Monday, December 5, 1955, the day Parks appeared in court. That evening, a mass meeting was held at the Holt Street Baptist Church to evaluate the boycott's success. The church was the largest and most central church in the black community, and had a large basement that could accommodate hundreds, as well as a spacious main auditorium. Loud speakers were placed into smaller rooms of the church, and there was a large outdoor area for people to gather. Several thousand attended the meeting, where a young pastor from the city's Dexter Avenue Baptist Church, Rev. Martin Luther King Jr., addressed the audience, describing the indignities suffered by Montgomery's black citizens and stating: "there comes a time when people get tired of being trampled over by the iron feet of oppression."

Rosa Parks wrote:

By the time I arrived at the meeting, the church was so filled up that a crowd of hundreds spilled out into the street, and speakers had to be set up outside to accommodate everyone. The excitement around the church was electrifying, and I remember having a sense that something powerful was being born. I squeezed my way through the crowd to my seat on the platform, where a lively discussion about the boycott strategy was underway.

The meeting at the Holt Street Baptist Church began the year-long Montgomery bus boycott.

A court case, Browder v. Gayle, was launched claiming that bus segregation was unconstitutional under the Fourteenth Amendment. On November 14, 1956, while the boycott continued, the Supreme Court ordered the state of Alabama to desegregate its buses. That evening, mass meetings were organized at both the Hutchinson Street Baptist Church and the Holt Street Baptist Church. King spoke at both meetings, where 8,000 attendees voted unanimously to end the boycott when the Supreme Court decision took effect.

On December 3, 1956, King attended the Holt Street Baptist Church where he delivered a speech entitled "Facing the Challenge of the New Age". It was the opening address of a week-long "Institute of Non-Violence and Social Change", organized by the Montgomery Improvement Association.

== Closure ==
In 1998, the church moved to a new complex called "The Village", located on South Court Street in Montgomery.

== See also ==
- List of Baptist churches in Alabama
