= James F. Blake =

American bus driver defied by Rosa Parks (1912–2002)

- Born: James Frederick Blake; April 14, 1912; Montgomery, Alabama, U.S.
- Died: March 21, 2002 (aged 89); Montgomery, Alabama, U.S
- Occupation: Bus driver (1943–1974)
- Employer: Montgomery City Bus Lines
- Known for: Bus driver defied by Rosa Parks after he ordered her to give up her seat – eventually leading to the Montgomery bus boycott

James Frederick Blake (April 14, 1912 – March 21, 2002) was an American bus driver in Montgomery, Alabama, whom Rosa Parks defied in December 1955, prompting the Montgomery bus boycott.

== Early life ==
Born on April 14, 1912, Blake was drafted into the Army on December 23, 1943, at Fort McClellan in Anniston, Alabama.

Blake worked as a bus driver for Montgomery Bus City Lines until 1974. After retiring, he became a member of the Morningview Baptist Church.

== Arrest of Rosa Parks ==
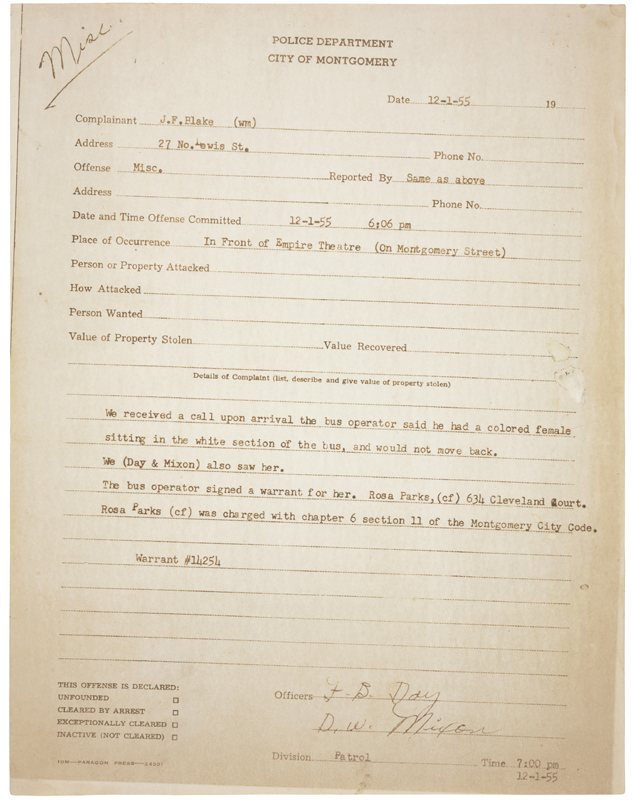
First page of Parks' arrest report. Blake is listed as the complainant and warrant issuer.

On June 15, 1955, while driving a bus in Montgomery, Blake tried to run off the road a car driven by Lucille Times. When she stopped to run an errand in Montgomery, he parked his bus across the street and proceeded to yell at Times, and they exchanged epithets and started fighting. Furious, Times contacted the National Association for the Advancement of Colored People (NAACP) and the bus company but received no response. She also sent unpublished letters to newspapers in Montgomery and Atlanta. For the next six months, Times retaliated against the bus company by driving by bus stops to offer free rides to waiting black passengers. In effect, Times began a boycott of the bus company six months before the NAACP and Rosa Parks began the better-known boycott of that company.

In 1955, Montgomery's black leaders were preparing to make a legal case against racial discrimination on the city bus system. Rosa Parks was selected to be the central figure in a challenge to the Jim Crow laws which supported segregation.

In 1943, Parks had boarded a bus driven by Blake. She entered the front door of that bus and paid her fare; as Parks continued on to take a seat, Blake told her to disembark and enter the bus again from the back door, a rule imposed by some drivers. When she got off to re-enter through the back however, Blake drove the bus away. Parks vowed to herself she would never ride with Blake again.

Blake and Parks encountered each other again on December 1, 1955 (Parks having forgotten to check who was driving the bus on this occasion), when Blake ordered Parks and three other black people to move to the back of his Cleveland Avenue bus (number 2857) in order to make room for a white passenger. By Parks' account, Blake said, "Y'all better make it light on yourselves and let me have those seats." When she refused, Blake first contacted the bus company and called his boss remarking, "I called the company first, just like I was supposed to do," Blake recalled in a later interview with the Washington Post. "I got my supervisor on the line. He said, 'Did you warn her, Jim?' I said, 'I warned her.' And he said, and I remember it just like I'm standing here, 'Well then, Jim, you do it, you got to exercise your powers and put her off, hear?' And that's just what I did."

After being arrested, Parks was fined $10 plus $4 in court fees (a total of around $170 as of 2026). Later, Blake contacted the police and signed the warrant for her arrest (Chapter 6, Section 11, of the city code gave drivers police powers for the racial assignment of seats.) The arrest sparked the Montgomery bus boycott and led to Browder v. Gayle, the 1956 court case on the basis of which a United States District Court abolished segregation in transportation for the jurisdiction in which Montgomery, Alabama, is located.

Commenting on the event afterwards, Blake stated, "I wasn't trying to do anything to that Parks woman except do my job. She was in violation of the city codes, so what was I supposed to do? That damn bus was full and she wouldn't move back. I had my orders. I had police powers—any driver for the city did. So the bus filled up and a white man got on, and she had his seat and I told her to move back, and she wouldn't do it."

== Personal life ==
Blake continued working at the bus company until he retired in 1974. Blake did not like to say much to the media or his family about the Parks matter, such as in 1989 when he was approached by a reporter of The Washington Post and yelled about wanting to close the book on the matter because of the "lies" printed about Blake while alleging that black people had called his house for weeks after the Parks incident. Blake joined the Morningview Baptist Church in 1980. Both the children's pastor of the church and Blake's wife defended him upon his death for his virtues as a churchgoing family man. Blake died of a heart attack at his Montgomery home on March 21, 2002, at age 89. He and his wife had been married for 68 years.

Rosa Parks was reported to have said in her condolences, "[I'm] sure his family will miss him."

== See also ==
- People of the Montgomery bus boycott
