= Mary Fair Burks =

American civil rights activist

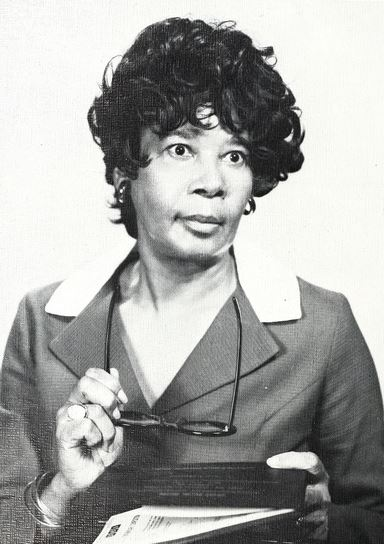
- Burks, 1976
- Born: Mary Fair; July 31, 1914; Montgomery, Alabama, U.S.
- Died: July 21, 1991 (aged 76); Salisbury, Maryland, U.S.
- Occupations: civil rights activist, academic
- Years active: 1930s–1991
- Spouse: Nathaniel W. Burks (m. 1946)
- Children: one

Mary Fair Burks (July 31, 1914 – July 21, 1991) was an American educator, scholar, and activist during the Civil Rights Movement from Montgomery, Alabama. Burks founded the Women’s Political Council in 1946, which helped initiate the Montgomery Bus Boycott following the arrest of Rosa Parks in 1955.

== Biography ==
Burks was born in Montgomery, Alabama, on July 31, 1914, the daughter of Gustavus "Gus" Samuel and Ollie (née Williams) Fair. She attended Alabama State University and earned a Bachelor of Science degree in English literature in 1933, and Michigan State University, where she earned a Master of Arts degree in the same field in 1934. Burks then went back to Montgomery to teach English at Alabama State Laboratory High School. The school’s principal, Nathaniel W. Burks, was a former professor of hers, and the two eventually married and had a child together. Their son, also named Nathaniel W. Burks, became a physician. She was head of the English department at Alabama State College in the late 1940s and early 1950s. Burks continued her own schooling as well by earning her doctorate in education from Columbia University, and she completed further postgraduate studies at universities such as Harvard and Oxford. In 1960, Burks resigned from Alabama State College after several professors were fired for their involvement in civil rights issues. Among the other 16 faculty members fired from the college was Jo Ann Robinson, a fellow member of the Women's Political Council that Burks worked closely with leading up to and during the Civil Rights Movement. Following the end of the movement, Burks moved to Salisbury, Maryland. Burks was an active member of her community there, where she founded two African American historical societies, worked with the volunteer program of a local hospital, and became a member of the Maryland Arts Council. She was appointed to a National Endowment for the Humanities reviewing panel in 1979, and she also taught literature at the University of Maryland Eastern Shore until her retirement in 1986. Burks died on July 21, 1991.

== Published works ==
Burks published numerous literary works, including a review of James Baldwin’s If Beale Street Could Talk as well as articles on Toni Morrison and other Black authors. In 1976, her journal article “The First Black Literary Magazine in American Letters” was published. In 1991, Burks contributed to a book titled “Women in the Civil Rights Movement: Trailblazers and Torchbearers”. The book included segments composed by a variety of different authors, and Burks wrote the “Montgomery Bus Boycott” section.

== The Women's Political Council ==
In 1935, Burks was involved in an incident with a white motorist that led to her being arrested by a white police officer. The incident demonstrated the prevalence of racism in Montgomery to Burks, which she had felt previously shielded from due to her education level and status. The incident inspired Burks to focus her attention towards advocating for racial equality in Montgomery, and a year later she founded the Women’s Political Council. The WPC focused its efforts around promoting civic involvement, increasing voter registration numbers, and lobbying city officials to address racist policies. At the time of its forming in 1946, the organization was composed of a group of 50 African American community members with occupations ranging from educators to nurses to social workers. Burks later wrote that she created the council as an “outgrowth of scars [she] suffered as a result of racism,” (Burks, 1990).

In 1950, Burks stepped down from her position as president of the WPC, explaining that “the position was demanding and I had been in office longer than I intended.” (Burks, 1990). Burks’ position was succeeded by Jo Ann Robinson, a colleague of Burks’ at the Alabama State College and a fellow member of the WPC. Burks continued to work with Robinson and maintained an active role in the organization, which Robinson transformed to turn its focus towards the racial inequality experienced by African Americans on public transportation and particularly buses. From 1955-1956, Burks and the other members of the WPC helped initiate and provide support for the Montgomery Bus Boycott after the arrest of Rosa Parks. Following the end of the Civil Rights Movement, Burks emphasized the importance of the organization in starting the Montgomery Bus Boycott and therefore the entire movement as well. Burks expressed that “Rosa Parks, Jo Ann Robinson, and members of the Women’s Political Council were trailblazers,” and “Martin Luther King, Jr. was a torchbearer”, claiming that a torchbearer is “one who follows the trailblazer” (Burks, 1990).

== Works cited ==
- Burks, Mary Fair. "Women in the Montgomery Bus Boycott". In Vicki L. Crawford, Jacqueline Anne Rouse, and Barbara Woods (eds), Women in the Civil Rights Movement: Trailblazers and Torchbearers 1941-1965, Bloomington: Indiana University Press, 1993, pp. 71–83.
