= Jo Ann Robinson =

American civil rights activist

Jo Ann Gibson Robinson
- Booking photograph of Robinson
- Born: Jo Ann Gibson; April 17, 1912 near Culloden, Georgia, U.S.
- Died: August 29, 1992 (aged 80); Los Angeles, California, U.S.
- Education: Atlanta University (M.A.)
- Known for: Montgomery bus boycott

Jo Ann Gibson Robinson (April 17, 1912 – August 29, 1992) was an activist during the Civil Rights Movement and educator in Montgomery, Alabama. Robinson is recognized mainly from her key role in the planning around the formation of the Montgomery Bus Boycott.

== Early life ==
Jo Ann Gibson was born near Culloden, Georgia, on April 17, 1912. She was the youngest of twelve children. Her parents were Owen Boston and Dollie Webb Gibson, who had owned a farm. Her father died when Robinson was only 6 years old. After her father's death, Robinson, her mother, and her eleven other siblings moved to Macon, Georgia. With her father's passing, Robinson was primarily raised by her mother, Dollie Webb Gibson, where in Georgia, she would later commit to challenging the racial injustices occurring across the South.

In her earlier life, she reflected the broader shift that was taking place across the United States at this time, where many African Americans were starting to move beyond their local communities and look more nationally for justice and opportunity. With her background of growing up in the South, she was aware of the inequality which helped build her determination to push beyond the societal limits she was facing.

Robinson excelled in school and earned valedictorian at her high school in her graduating year. She became the first person in her family to graduate from college, where she attended Fort Valley State College (now Fort Valley State University).

== Career and college ==
Robinson graduated from Fort Valley State College with her bachelor's degree in 1934. After college, she became a public school teacher in Macon, where she was married to Wilbur Robinson for a short time. Five years later, she went to Atlanta, where she earned an M.A. in English at Atlanta University. Robinson continued her education even after earning her master's degree at New York's Columbia University, and continued to study English. Shortly after, she went to teach at Mary Allen College. After teaching in Texas, she then accepted a position at Alabama State College (now Alabama State University) in Montgomery. As a professor, Robinson was highly respected, and instilled the elements of public participation, with a focus on community involvement, into her students. She was also active in the Dexter Avenue Baptist Church.

Her career as a teacher was very important during this period, as it showed the important roles of higher education, especially for Black women, where there were rare opportunities for independence at this time. Robinson would later recognize her ability to teach gave her more confidence to move around states and take risks, which was not common for lots of women during this era.

== Women's Political Council (WPC) ==
In Montgomery, Alabama, Robinson joined the Women's Political Council (WPC), which Mary Fair Burks had founded three years earlier. The WPC worked on a variety of issues including community empowerment, reducing juvenile delinquency, and encouraging voter registration. It also encouraged women's involvement in civic affairs, enlisting women in Montgomery to canvass for petition signatures and to confront city officials about police brutality, sexual assault, the poor conditions of segregated parks, and humiliating treatment on city buses. In addition, the council assisted women who were victims of rape.

The WPC represented an important form of activism led by Black women, who were often seen as bold or militant due to them challenging segregation head on, Many women in this organization formed communities, educated voters, and helped lay the groundwork for larger civil rights actions such as Robinson and the Montgomery Bus Boycott.

Robinson became the president of the WPC in 1950 until at least 1956. Robinson herself issued a letter to city officials, specifically directed towards W.A. Gayle, the mayor of Montgomery, Alabama at the time, suggesting a seating arrangement on buses common in various cities to allow desegregation.

== Segregation on Montgomery buses ==
In 1949, Robinson was verbally attacked by a bus driver for sitting in the front "Whites only" section of the bus. The whites-only section was empty except for one person 2 rows in front of her. Out of fear that the incident would escalate and that the driver would go from verbal abuse to physical, Robinson chose to leave the bus. Her response to the incident was to attempt to start a protest boycott against bus segregation in Alabama. However, when Robinson approached fellow WPC members with her story and proposal, she was told that it was "a fact of life in Montgomery." Robinson notes this as a pivotal moment that pushed her to having a core belief that organized protest being needed now, and further down the road. In late 1950, she succeeded Burks as president of the WPC and helped focus the group's efforts on buses, becoming an outspoken critic of the treatment of African Americans on public transportation. To further her efforts, Robinson met with William A. Gayle, the mayor of Montgomery at the time, as well as with City Hall's council, but they were not interested in what she had to say. When City Hall's leaders were no help, Robinson took matters into her own hands and organized a boycott once again.

The WPC made complaints to the Montgomery City Commission about the bus seating and abusive drivers. They achieved some concessions, including an undertaking that drivers would be courteous, and having buses stop at every corner in Black neighborhoods as they did in white areas.

After Brown vs. Board of Education (1954), Robinson informed the mayor of the city that a boycott would soon rise. After Rosa Parks' arrest, they seized the moment to plan the Montgomery bus boycott.

External videos
- "Filmed interview with Jo Ann Robinson" conducted for America, They Loved You Madly in 1979, a precursor to Eyes on the Prize. Robinson's interview centers on her role as the president of the Women's Political Council and the Montgomery Bus Boycott.

On Thursday, December 1, 1955, Rosa Parks was arrested for refusing to move from her seat in the black area of the bus she was traveling on to make way for a white passenger who was standing. Parks, a civil rights organizer, had intended to instigate a reaction from white citizens and authorities. That night, with Parks' permission, Robinson stayed up mimeographing 35,000 handbills calling for a boycott of the Montgomery bus system, with the help of the chairman of the Alabama State College business department, John Cannon, and two students. The boycott was planned, and highly organized by members of Black communities to replace the functions of buses. Se used carpools, volunteers, or shares resources, all coming together in collective action to advocate for the change they wanted.

The boycott was supported and fought by many. In a 1976 interview, Robinson pointed out, "That boycott was not supported by a few people; it was supported by 52,000 people". The boycott was initially planned for just the following Monday. Robinson passed out the leaflets at a Friday afternoon meeting of AME Zionist clergy, among other places, and Reverend L. Roy Bennett requested other ministers attend a meeting that Friday night and to urge their congregations to take part in the boycott. Robinson, Reverend Ralph Abernathy, two of her senior students and other WPC members then passed out the handbills to high school students leaving school that afternoon.

After the success of the one-day boycott, Black citizens decided to continue the boycott and established the Montgomery Improvement Association to focus their efforts. The Reverend Martin Luther King Jr. was elected president. Robinson never became a member of this group. She had declined an official position to the Montgomery Improvement Association because of her teaching position at Alabama State. She served on its executive board and edited their newsletter, at King's request. Behind the scenes, Robinson also helped in carpooling African Americans to work. She was so involved King took notice in his memoir of the boycott, Stride Towards Freedom. Dr. King said of Robinson, "Apparently indefatigable, she, perhaps more than any other person, was active on every level of protest". In order to protect her position at Alabama State College, and to protect her colleagues, Robinson purposely stayed out of the limelight, even though she worked diligently with the MIA. Robinson and other WPC members also helped sustain the boycott by providing transportation for boycotters. Many Women's civic networks, or WPC's, including the ones Robinson was actively engaged and networking with were a crucial aspect in having participation across communities through the year-long boycott that was taking place.

Robinson was the target of several acts of intimidation. Robinson was arrested many times. In February 1956, a local police officer threw a stone through the window of her house. Then two weeks later, another police officer poured acid on her car. The violence was so bad that the governor of Alabama ordered the state police to guard the houses of the boycott leaders. The boycott lasted over a year because the bus company would not give in to the demands of the protesters. On December 20, 1956, the boycotts finally ended after the federal district court deemed segregated seating was unconstitutional. The federal case that ultimately ended the long-standing issue of bus segregation was in 1956, with the decision of Browder v. Gayle. However, Robinson fought hard and took great pride in the eventual success of the boycott. In her memoir, Robinson wrote, "An oppressed but brave people, whose pride and dignity rose to the occasion, conquered fear, and faced whatever perils had to be confronted. The boycott was the most beautiful memory that all of us who participated will carry to our final resting place." The Montgomery bus boycott broke through and gave real hope as it helped to inspire other protests because of its success and, of course, lead to many protests with the importance of nonviolence that MLK preached. After a student sit-in in early 1960, Robinson and other teachers who supported the students resigned their positions at Alabama State College. Robinson left Alabama State College and moved out of Montgomery that year. She taught at Grambling College in Louisiana for one year, then moved to Los Angeles and taught English in the public school system. In Los Angeles, she continued to be active in local women's organizations. Robinson taught in the LA schools until she retired from teaching in 1976. Robinson was strongly against discrimination. Robinson inspired many young women to join the protest and to fight. Robinson said, "Women's leadership was no less important to the development of the Montgomery Bus Boycott than was the male and minister-dominated leadership."

Robinson's memoir, The Montgomery Bus Boycott and the Women Who Started It, edited by David J. Garrow, was published in 1987 by the University of Tennessee Press. In her memoir, it shed more light on the topic of the role Black women had in forming the boycott, and how crucial their leadership was.

== Legacy ==
In 2021, the Georgia Historical Society erected a historical marker for the birthplace of Jo Ann Gibson Robinson in Monroe County, Georgia.

On September 17, 2021, the Alabama State University board of trustees voted unanimously to name a residence hall after Robinson. The naming ceremony took place in April 2022.

Jo Ann Robinson among other famous names such as Rosa Parks, Claudette Colvin and others, are featured in the newly opened site in Montgomery, Alabama, called Montgomery Square. The square is produced from the work of the Equal Justice Initiative and is supposed to memorialize the lives of those who fought against racial injustice in Montgomery and beyond. This place overall offers a various history of the threats of violence Black residents faced leading up to the Montgomery Bus Boycott from 1955 to 1965, which Robinson played a crucial role in.

Many scholars have made note that the work that Robinson had contributed to the overarching Civil Rights Movement have been an example of how Black Women came to leadership, and pushed for action. This sets apart from the focus mainly being on the male leaders. Specifically her efforts towards more grassroots organizing by her and other Black women being a major role in the formation of events such as the Montgomery Bus Boycott, even when women like her were not the more visible figures of the movement overall.

Her memoir from 1987, The Montgomery Bus Boycott and The Women Who Started It, is cited a great deal, especially for Civil Rights Scholarship to understand earlier notions from figures such as Robinson. There was a primary focus on the more clergy side of leadership during this process. Her memoir also linked to the analysis of various grassroots and female leadership aspects of the Civil Rights Movement when looking at the broader historiographical impacts. Her personal insight in her memoir still holds a key part of the movement, as it shows how the movement was laid out and organized through efforts such her and other women in Montgomery playing key roles.

Historical Institutions that focus on African American history have described Robinson as a key part of not only the Montgomery Bus Boycott, but the Civil Rights Movement in general, making her one of the most significant, but underrecognized figures of this era.

Across the nation in various Civil Rights institutions, Robinson has frequently been put more in the spotlight. Many times her role in the boycott, ideals and efforts for organized strategy, mobilizing female leaders and organizations, and sustaining participation are all tied to who she was as an activist.

Robinson alone can be seen as a powerful figure who even met with danger, violence, or being arrested, never stopped fighting for what she believed in.

== Personal life ==
Robinson was a member of The Links. This was an organization that was dedicated to helping African American lives in terms of involvement with community service to enhance their overall stability. This is a non-profit foundation led by women to help people across the nation and beyond get on the right path for life in areas economically, socially, etc.

Robinson had valued education as a necessity, for both herself in her profession, but also a tool for advancement in society. She saw the role of education important to her as she maintained a lifelong commitment to teaching after leaving her activism and duties in Montgomery.

After her time in Montgomery in 1960, she relocated to Louisiana and then to Los Angeles, where she then stayed until her retirement in 1976, where she taught in the local public schools. In Los Angeles, she also stayed involved in local organizations and community initiatives, which gave her more experience in activism outside the national spotlight.

Though Robinson's central role was in the boycott, she was one that did not like to be in the public eye, as for many years se did not want her involvement to be spoken about. This was until she released he own version of her actions in her memoir in 1987.

This decision to be out of the public during the boycott had been motivated by her own beliefs concerning her protection of her job as a teacher, as well as her colleagues at her place of work at the time, Alabama State College.

The interviews she was in later on in life showcased her love for being active in a collective community effort, than on her own in individual leadership, as she said this is what truly defined the success of the boycott.

Robinson died on August 29, 1992, in Los Angeles, California at the age of 80. Her cause of death is not documented.

Following her death, the public and scholarly interest in her contributions is recognized greatly, especially concerning the role of women's organizing within the Civil Rights Movement era.

== See also ==
- Claudette Colvin
- List of civil rights leaders

== Sources ==
Abernathy Ralph David (1989), And The Walls Came Tumbling Down, Harper & Row, Publishers, New York page 138 ISBN 0-06-016192-2

== Bibliography ==
- Robinson, Jo Ann Gibson and David J Garrow. The Montgomery Bus Boycott and the Women Who Started It: The Memoir of Jo Ann Gibson Robinson. Knoxville: University of Tennessee Press, 1987.
- "Jo Ann Robinson." Biography.com, A&E Networks Television, 15 Apr. 2019, www.biography.com/activist/jo-ann-robinson.
- "Jo Ann Robinson: A Heroine of the Montgomery Bus Boycott." National Museum of African American History and Culture, 15 Mar. 2018, nmaahc.si.edu/blog-post/jo-ann-robinson-heroine-montgomery-bus-boycott.
- "Robinson, Jo Ann Gibson." The Martin Luther King Jr., Research and Education Institute, 5 Apr. 2018, kinginstitute.stanford.edu/encyclopedia/robinson-jo-ann-gibson.
