= Charles Octavius Boothe =

African American Baptist preacher and educator

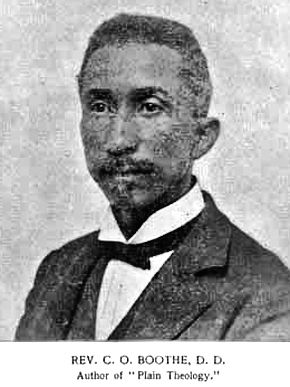
- Born: June 13, 1845; Mobile County, Alabama
- Died: February 27, 1924; Springfield, Ohio
- Occupations: Educator, minister

Religious life
- Religion: Baptist

Charles Octavius Boothe (13 June 1845 – 27 February 1924) was an African American Baptist preacher and educator. He also helped establish the Colored Baptist Missionary Convention of the State of Alabama.

== Biography ==
Boothe was born into slavery on June 13, 1845, in Mobile County, Alabama. He encountered Christianity at a young age, witnessing white and African Americans worshipping together in a local Baptist church. However, he only converted to Christianity after the end of the Civil War, baptized in 1866 and ordained a minister in 1868.

Boothe was strongly concerned with the "uplift" of African Americans, attempting to offer basic literacy and religious and moral education. This included providing the resources necessary to improve the status of African Americans in American society. He helped establish the Colored Baptist Missionary Convention of the State of Alabama in the early 1870s, as a ministerial alliance of Black Baptist churches. He also published a number of resources, such as Plain Theology for Plain People (1890), in order to articulate "the doctrines of our holy religion" with "simplicity of arrangement and simplicity of language."

Eventually retiring from his work in the 1900s, Boothe died on February 27, 1924, in Springfield, Ohio.

== Works ==
- Boothe, Charles Octavius (1890). Plain Theology for Plain People. American Baptist Publication Society.
- Boothe, Charles Octavius (1895). The Cyclopedia of the Colored Baptists of Alabama: Their Leaders and Their Work. Alabama Publishing Company.
