= Women's Political Council =

Organization that formed in 1946

The Women's Political Council (WPC), founded in Montgomery, Alabama, was an organization that formed in 1946 that was an early force active in the civil rights movement that was formed to address the racial issues in the city. Members included Mary Fair Burks, Jo Ann Robinson, Maude Ballou, Irene West, Thelma Glass, and Euretta Adair.

The WPC was the first group to officially call for a boycott of the bus system during the Montgomery bus boycott, beginning in December 1955. The group led efforts in the early 1950s to secure better treatment for Black bus passengers, and in December 1955 it initiated the thirteen-month bus boycott. They helped organize communications to get it started, as well as to support it, including giving people rides who were boycotting the buses. The African Americans of Montgomery upheld the boycott for more than a year. It ended in late December 1956, after the United States Supreme Court ruled in Browder v. Gayle that the state and local laws for bus segregation were unconstitutional, and ordered the state to desegregate public transportation.

== Origins ==
The WPC formed in 1946 as a civic organization for African-American professional women in the city of Montgomery, Alabama. It was organized by Mary Fair Burks, the chairperson of the English department at Alabama State College, and 40 other women. The WPC was a political organization composed of Alabama State College faculty members and the wives of black professional men throughout the city. It was inspired by the Atlanta Neighborhood Union. Many of its middle-class women were active in education; most of WPC's members were educators at Alabama State College or Montgomery's public schools. The organization targeted Montgomery's small population of black middle-class women, encouraging their civic involvement and promoting voter registration. About forty women attended the first organizational meeting. Burks was the group's first president. Burks decided to form the organization after she was arrested after a traffic dispute with a white woman.

The group's initial purposes were to foster women's involvement in civic affairs, to promote voter registration through citizenship education, and to aid women who were victims of rape or assault. Many African Americans were illiterate due to centuries of oppression and poverty; they would sometimes fail the literacy test they were forced to take in order to vote. Other times, they were told they had come to the wrong location for registration or come on the wrong date. One goal of the WPC was to teach adults to read and write well enough to fulfill the literacy requirements for voting. One of its most successful programs was an annual event called Youth City, which taught Black high school students about politics and government and "what democracy could and should mean". During election campaigns the WPC worked with the white-only League of Women Voters to inform Black citizens about political candidates.

In 1949, Jo Ann Robinson, a newly hired English professor at Alabama State College, joined the council. Her firsthand experiences with segregated seating on buses prompted Robinson to succeed Burks as WPC president in 1950 and to shift the council's primary focus to challenging the seating policy. She organized the Women's Political Council and within a month's time they had over a hundred members. They organized a second chapter and a third, and soon they had more than 300 members. They had members in every elementary, junior high, and senior high school. They had them organized from federal and state and local jobs; Wherever there were more than 10 blacks employed, they had a member there. Under her leadership the council grew to over 200 members and expanded to three chapters in different areas of the city. Eventually, there were around three hundred members and all of them were registered to vote.

As president, she began to study the issue of bus segregation, which affected the many blacks who were the majority of riders on the city system. First, members appeared before the City Commission to report abuses on the buses, such as blacks who were first on the bus being required later to give up seats for whites as buses became crowded. The commission acted surprised but did nothing.

== Bus boycott ==
In Montgomery, black women especially were regularly humiliated by the bus service. Jo Ann Robinson sat down in the white section of a city bus one day without thinking. She was brought to tears by the bus driver who cursed her out for sitting there. The Women's political council was formed because of these indignities. During the early 1950s WPC leaders met regularly with Mayor W. A. Gayle and the city commission to lobby for bus reforms. They complained that the city did not hire any black bus drivers, said that segregation of seating was unjust, and that bus stops in black neighborhoods were farther apart than in white ones, although blacks were the majority of the riders. Although they succeeded in pressuring the city to hire its first Black police officers, they made no progress in their effort to ameliorate bus segregation. Robinson and other WPC members met with bus company officials on their own. The segregation issue was deflected, as bus company officials said that segregation was city and state law. The WPC achieved a small victory, as the bus company officials agreed to have the buses stop at every corner in black neighborhoods, as was the practice in white neighborhoods.

In May 1954, shortly after the Brown v. Board of Education United States Supreme Court decision was announced, Robinson wrote a letter to Mayor W. A. Gayle saying that there was growing support among local black organizations for a bus boycott.

By 1955, there was growing dissatisfaction with the segregated bus system. The WPC decided that when the right person got arrested, they would initiate a boycott. When Claudette Colvin, a fifteen-year-old high school student was arrested in March 1955, for refusing to give up her seat, the WPC and other local civil rights organizations began to discuss a boycott. Colvin's arrest and conviction angered and unified the Black community, but when they discovered that the unmarried Colvin was pregnant, they did not want to use her as the point person, as she would not have commanded support among the religious and conservative blacks.

Rosa Parks, the secretary of the Montgomery chapter of the NAACP, was arrested in December 1955; she, the NAACP, and the WPC agreed that she could be the lead for a boycott. At a meeting of about fifty people in the basement of the Dexter Avenue Baptist Church, a part of the 1965 historic route of the Selma to Montgomery trial, on December 2, 1955, Parks first told the story of her arrest and the group decided to mount a bus boycott. Participants initially decided was to have a one-day boycott on Monday, December 5, but because the boycott that day was so successful, discussion of continuing it began at a meeting afterward at the church due to the fact that roughly 70 percent of Montgomery's bus passengers were black and most stayed off the buses. A few years earlier, the minister of the Dexter Avenue Baptist Church had tried to prompt a group of blacks to walk off a bus in protest. The driver had ordered Reverend Vernon Johns to get up and let a white man sit down. Johns stood up and challenged the other blacks to march off the bus with him. Asking blacks to protest was asking a lot. They could expect to be fired from their jobs and harassed on the streets, ad could possibly become victims of an economic boycott on the part of the white segregationists. A successful bus boycott would need to be mapped out carefully and executed with discipline. Robinson was consulted by E. D. Nixon, president of the NAACP. The night of Parks' arrest, Robinson called the other WPC leaders, and they agreed that this was the right time for a bus boycott. Parks was a longtime NAACP activist who was deeply respected and seemed like the ideal community symbol around which to mobilize a mass protest.

Robinson stayed up all night copying 35,000 handbills by a mimeograph machine at Alabama State College to distribute the next day. She called students and arranged to meet them at elementary and high schools in the morning. She drove to the various schools to drop the handbills off to the students who would distribute them in the schools and ask students to take them home for their parents. Robinson did not put her name or that of the Women's Political Council on the handbills. She feared the city and state officials would realize she had used the mimeograph machine at Alabama State and, in revenge, cut off funds for the all-black school. The handbills asked blacks to boycott the buses the following Monday, December 5, in support of Parks. Thelma Glass and her students helped distribute fliers.

By Friday night, word of a boycott had spread all over the city. That same night, local ministers and civil rights leaders held a meeting and announced the boycott for Monday. With some ministers hesitant to engage their congregations in a boycott, about half left the meeting in frustration. They decided to hold a mass meeting Monday night to decide if the boycott should continue.

The one-day boycott was so successful that the organizers met on Monday night and decided to continue. They established the Montgomery Improvement Association to organize the boycott and elected the Reverend Martin Luther King Jr. as president. Jo Ann Robinson served on the group's executive board and edited their newsletter. In order to protect her position at Alabama State College and her colleagues, she stayed out of the limelight. Robinson and other WPC members helped sustain the boycott by providing car transportation for many boycotters.

On February 1, 1956, associated lawyers filed a civil suit, Browder v. Gayle, in the United States District Court, on behalf of five women who had each been arrested for defying bus segregation (one dropped out that month.) A three-judge panel ruled on June 13, 1956, that bus segregation was unconstitutional, and the case went to the US Supreme Court. It upheld the lower court ruling on December 17, 1956, and three days later ordered the state to desegregate the buses.

The boycott had demonstrated African-American organizing power and highlighted civil rights issues in the city. Its success helped further steps in the drive for civil rights.

=== Members After The Women Political Council ===
Robinson and Burks left Montgomery in 1960, after several Alabama State College professors were fired for civil rights activities. Robinson taught for one year at Grambling State College in Grambling, Louisiana, then moved to Los Angeles, where she taught English in the public schools until 1976, when she retired. After retiring, Robinson remained active in a host of civic and social groups, giving one day a week of free service to the city of Los Angeles and serving in the League of Women Voters, the Alpha Gamma Omega chapter of the Alpha Kappa Alpha sorority, the Angel City chapter of The Links, the Black Women's Alliance, the Founders Church of Religious Science, and Women on Target. In 1987, Robinson published her memoir about the boycott, The Montgomery Bus Boycott and the Women Who Started It, which won the publication prize by the Southern Association for Women's Historians. Through her historical work, Robinson helped restore women to their proper place in the Montgomery boycott, and through her political commitment, she helped launch one of the most important civil rights struggles in the Jim Crow South.

In 1960, Burks resigned from Alabama State College after several professors were fired for their involvement in civil rights issues. She then taught literature at the University of Maryland until her retirement in 1986. Burks was appointed to a National Endowment for the Humanities reviewing panel in 1979.

=== Decline of the Women Political Council ===
The success of the boycott and the rise of the Montgomery Improvement Association contributed to the organization's decline. The MIA was created to direct the boycott, as a result the WPC leadership role in the black community was diminished. Younger women reinvigorated the council, guided by older members serving as role models. Robinson stated in her memoir that "Members felt that young, concerned women, with their futures ahead, would benefit by the WPC and that we would help them to organize and select goals and directions for their future." Information is not available on the extent to which the younger women became involved in the later civil rights movement in Montgomery and elsewhere.
