= Rosa Parks Act =

2006 Alabama law

On April 18, 2006, the Rosa Parks Act was approved in the legislature of the U.S. state of Alabama to allow those, including Rosa Parks posthumously, considered law-breakers at the time of the Montgomery bus boycott to clear their arrest records of the charge of civil disobedience. The Alabama House of Representatives approved the Act unanimously, but three senators in the Alabama Senate opposed it. The Act was signed into law by Governor Bob Riley on April 28, 2006.
