= Dexter Avenue Baptist Church =

Historic church in Alabama, United States

- U.S. National Register of Historic Places
- U.S. National Historic Landmark
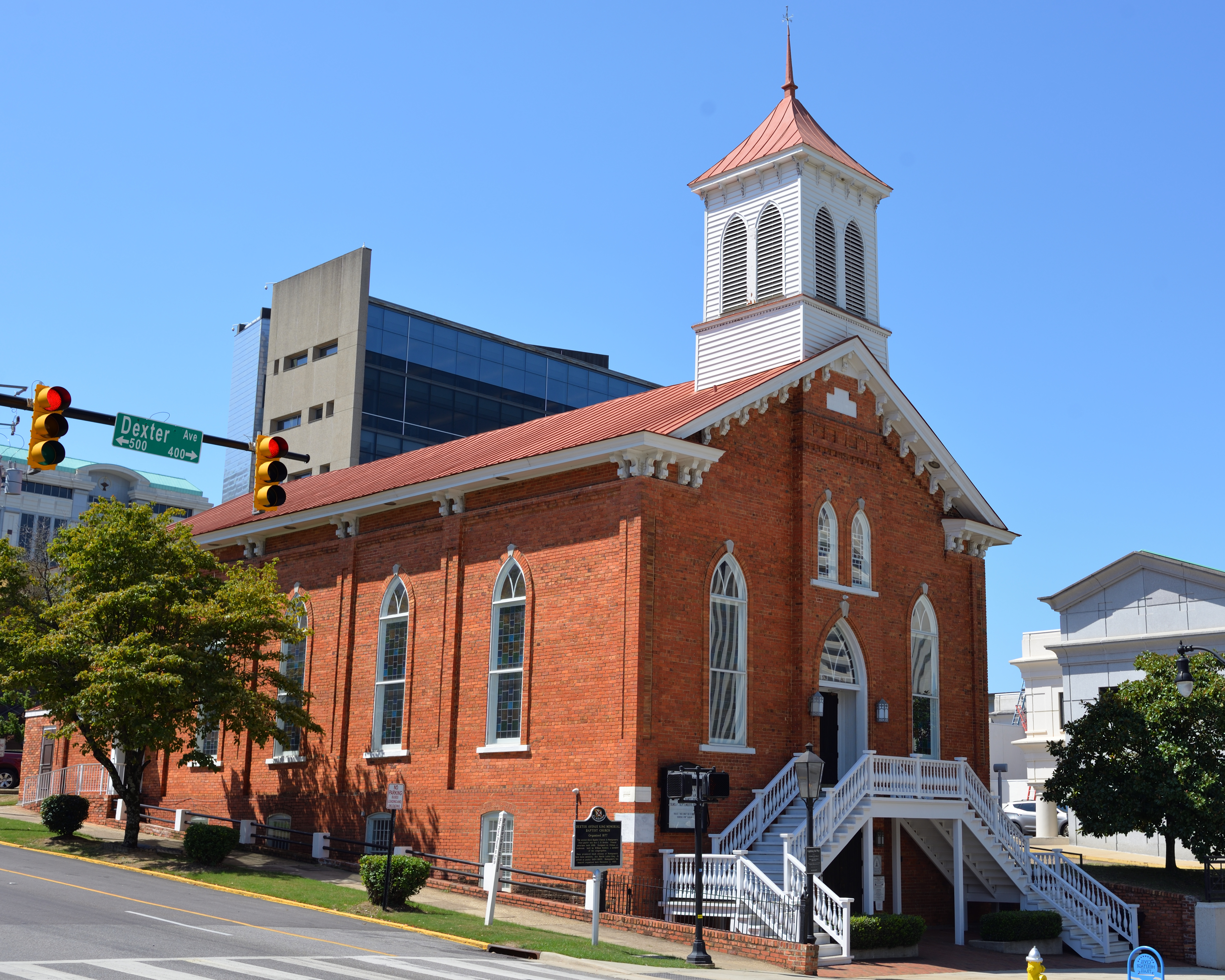
- Dexter Avenue Baptist Church

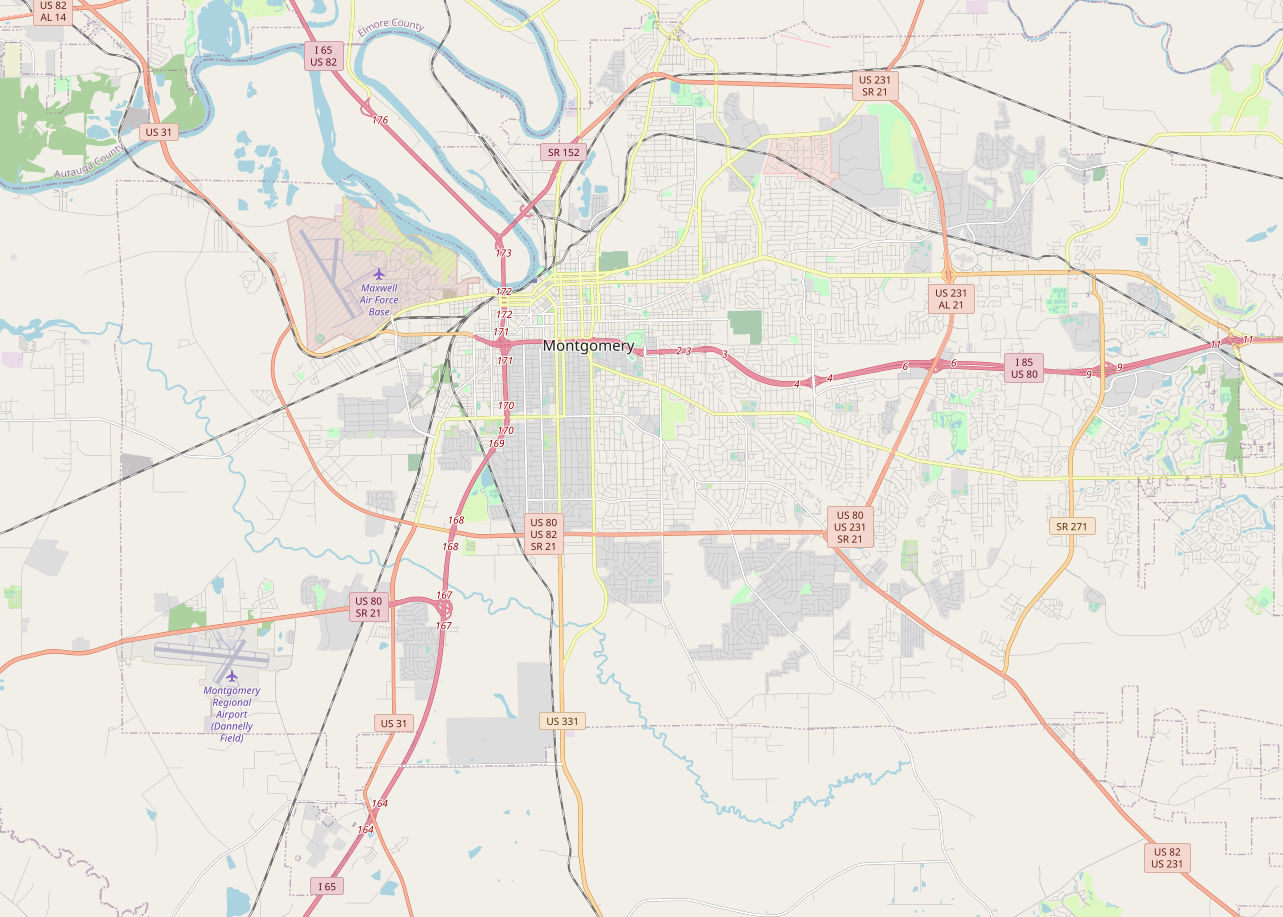
- Location within Montgomery, Alabama Location within Alabama Location within the United States
- Location: 454 Dexter Avenue; Montgomery, Alabama
- Coordinates: 32°22′38.26″N 86°18′10″W
- Built: 1883–89
- Architectural style: Late Victorian
- NRHP reference No.: 74000431

Significant dates
- Added to NRHP: July 1, 1974
- Designated NHL: May 30, 1974

Dexter Avenue Baptist Church is a Baptist church in Montgomery, Alabama, United States, affiliated with the Progressive National Baptist Convention. The church was designated as a National Historic Landmark in 1974 because of its importance in the civil rights movement and American history. In 1978 the official name was changed to the Dexter Avenue King Memorial Baptist Church, in memory of Dr. Martin Luther King Jr., who was pastor there and helped organize the Montgomery bus boycott in 1955 during the civil rights era. The church is located steps away from the Alabama State Capitol.

On January 1, 2008, the US Government submitted the church to UNESCO as part of an envisaged future World Heritage Site nomination, because of this important history. It is on the UNESCO "Tentative List of World Heritage Sites".

== History ==
The Dexter Avenue Baptist Church congregation was organized in 1877 by freedmen and free people of color. It was first known as the Second Colored Baptist Church. The founding pastor was Charles Octavius Boothe. The church trustees paid $270 on January 30, 1879, for a lot at the corner of what is now Dexter Avenue and Decatur Street. The first church building was a small wood-frame building. The congregation began construction of a new building in 1883; the brick building was not completed until 1889. The church began serving the broader African American community on October 3, 1887, when it hosted the first registration of students for Alabama State University, a historically black college.

In 1899, William H. McAlpine became pastor; he was a cofounder of Selma University. Vernon Johns, an early leader of the Civil Rights Movement, served as pastor from 1947 to 1952. He was succeeded by Dr. Martin Luther King Jr., who was pastor of the church from 1954 to 1960. He organized the 1955 Montgomery bus boycott from his basement office.

Near the church is the former Dexter Parsonage, which served as home to twelve pastors of the church between 1920 and 1992. It is now operated as the Dexter Parsonage Museum, interpreting church history. The church was added, on its own merits, to the National Register of Historic Places in 1982.

Behind the church is the Dexter Avenue King Memorial Legacy Center, on 455 Washington Avenue. The courtyard has a statue of Dr. King.

== Gallery ==
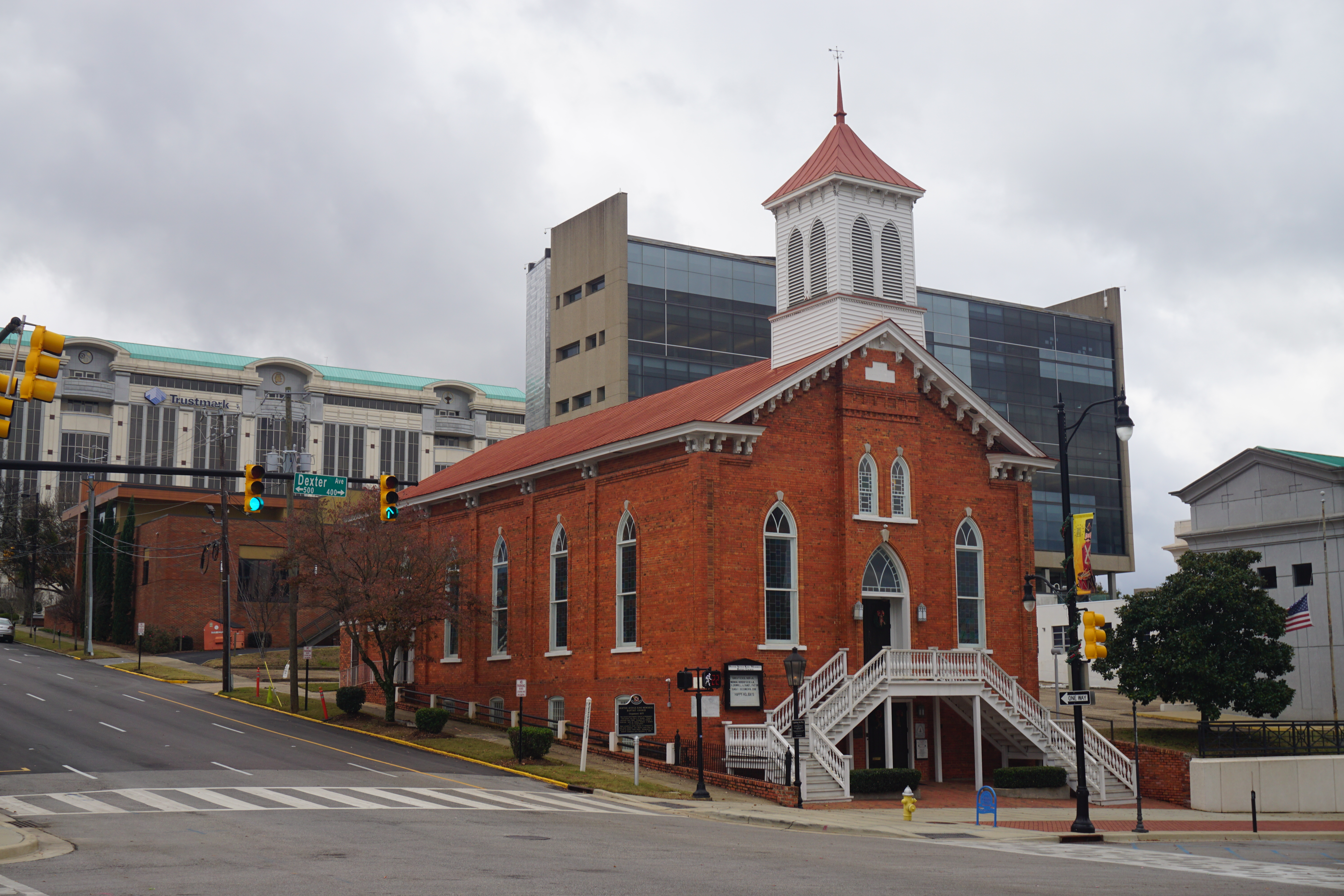
Exterior

Interior

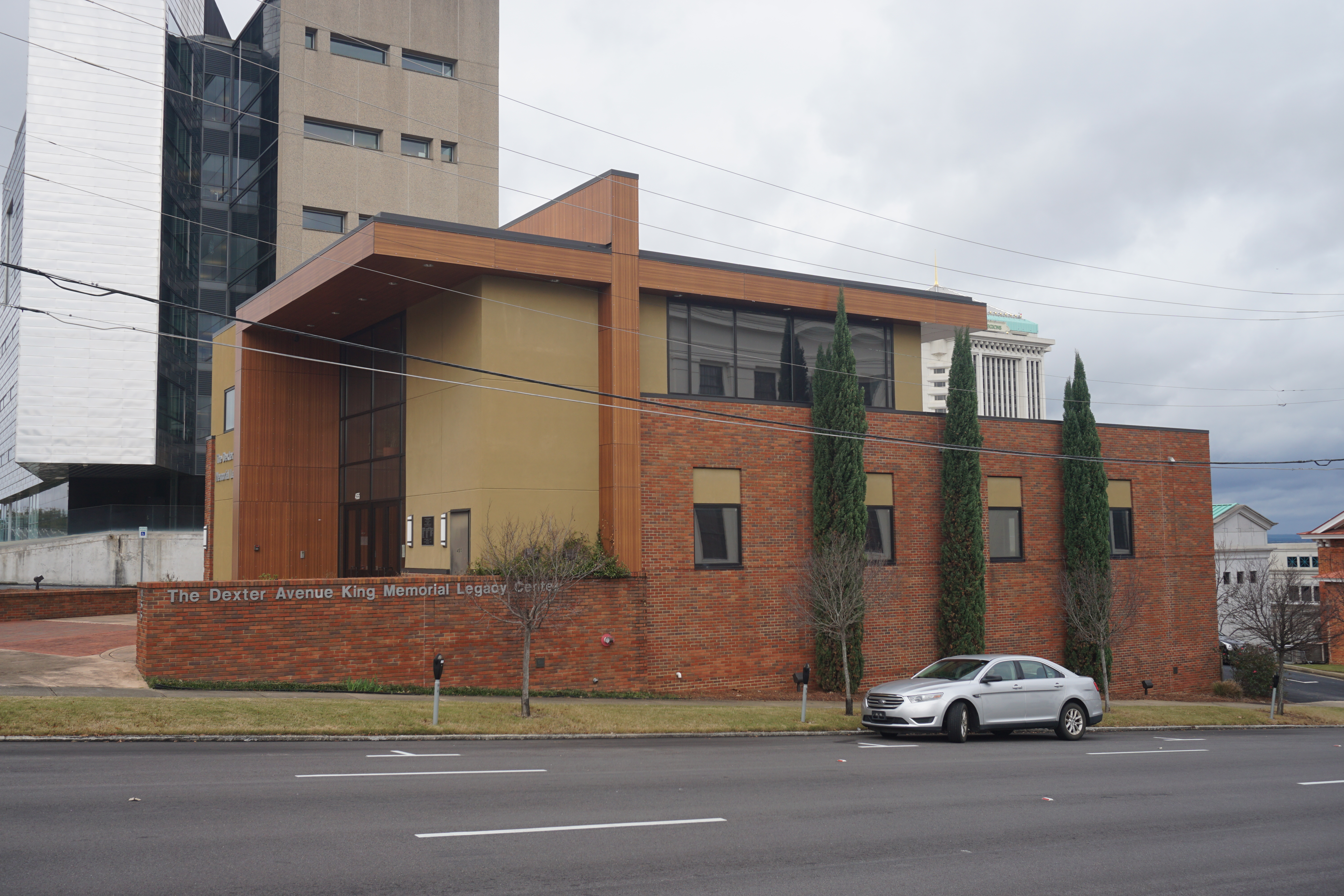
Dexter Avenue King Memorial Legacy Center

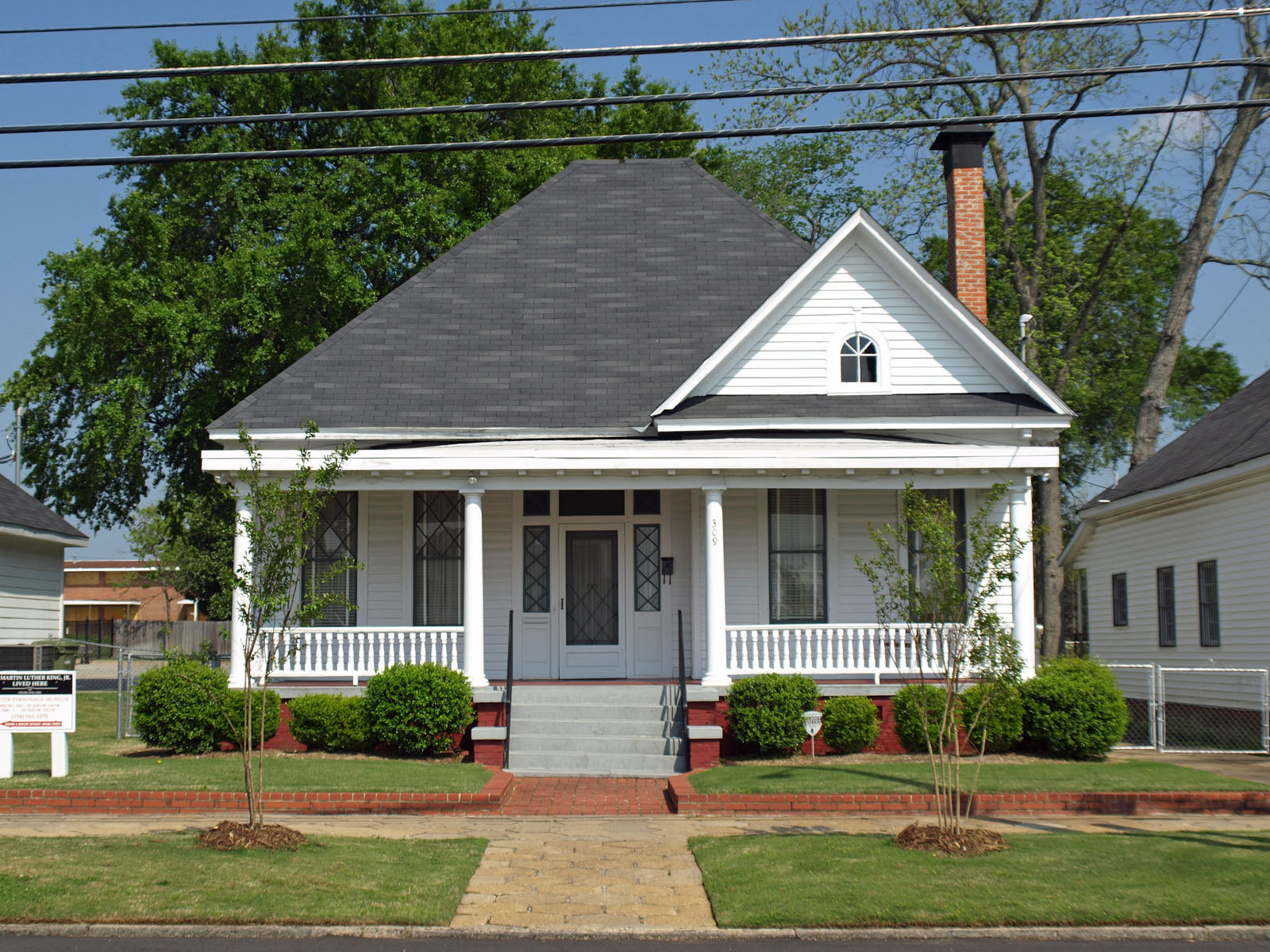
Dexter Parsonage Museum

== See also ==
- List of National Historic Landmarks in Alabama
- List of Baptist churches in Alabama
