= List of African-American activists =

This is a list of African-American activists covering various areas of activism, but primarily focused on those African-Americans who historically and currently have been fighting racism and racial injustice against African-Americans. The United States has a long history of racism against its Black citizens. The names detailed below include only notable African-Americans who are known to be activist (sorted by surname).

== List of activists ==
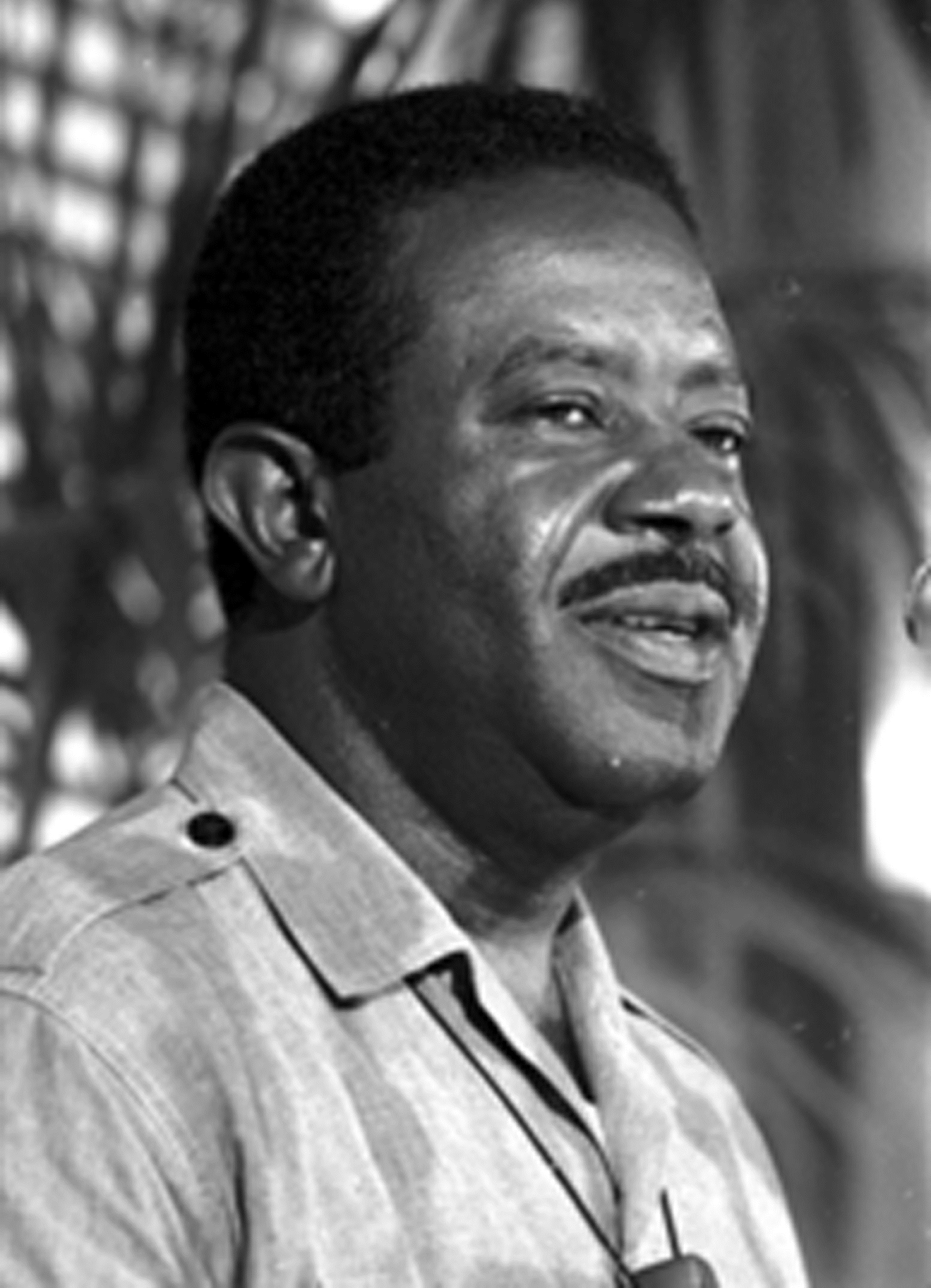
Ralph Abernathy

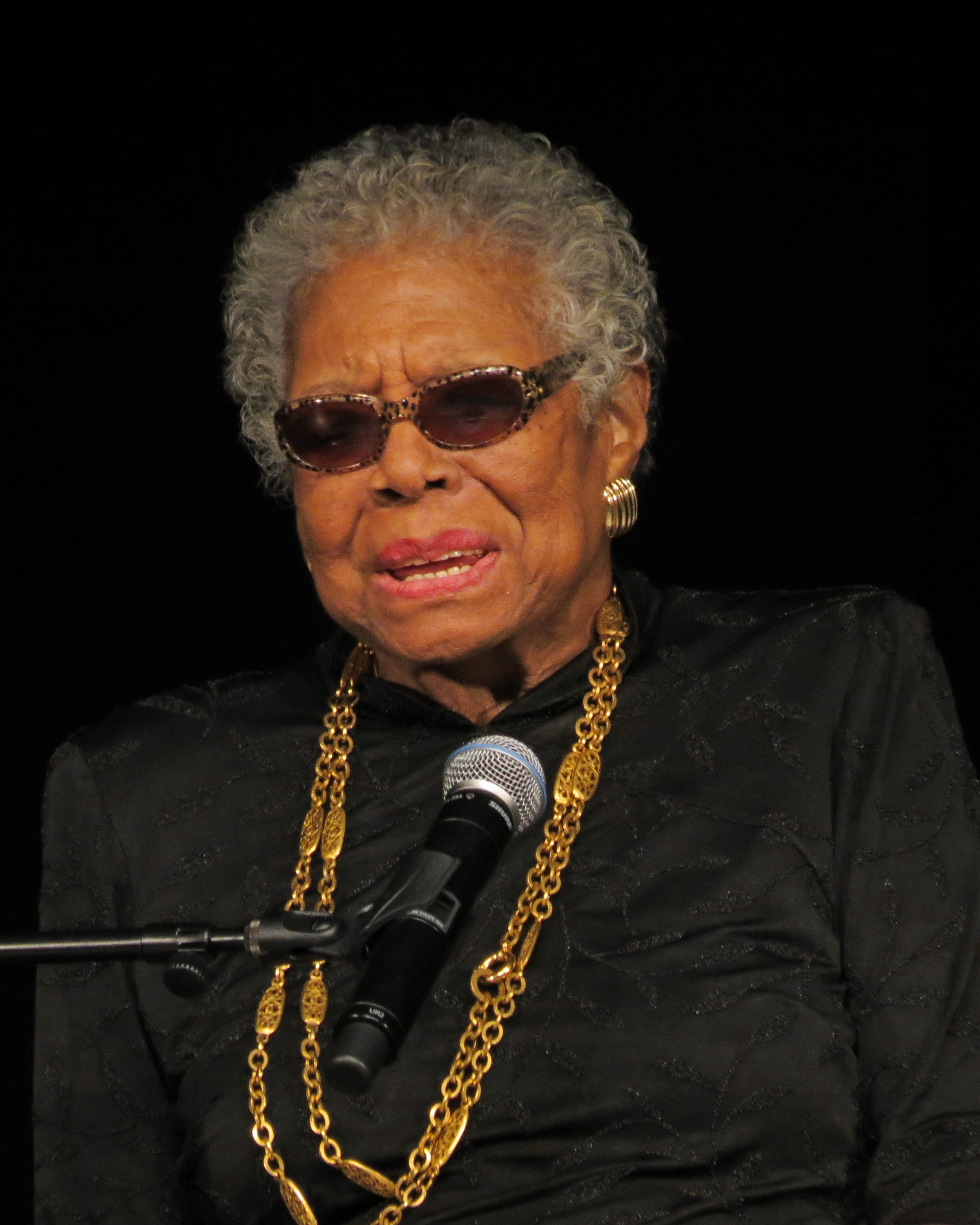
Maya Angelou

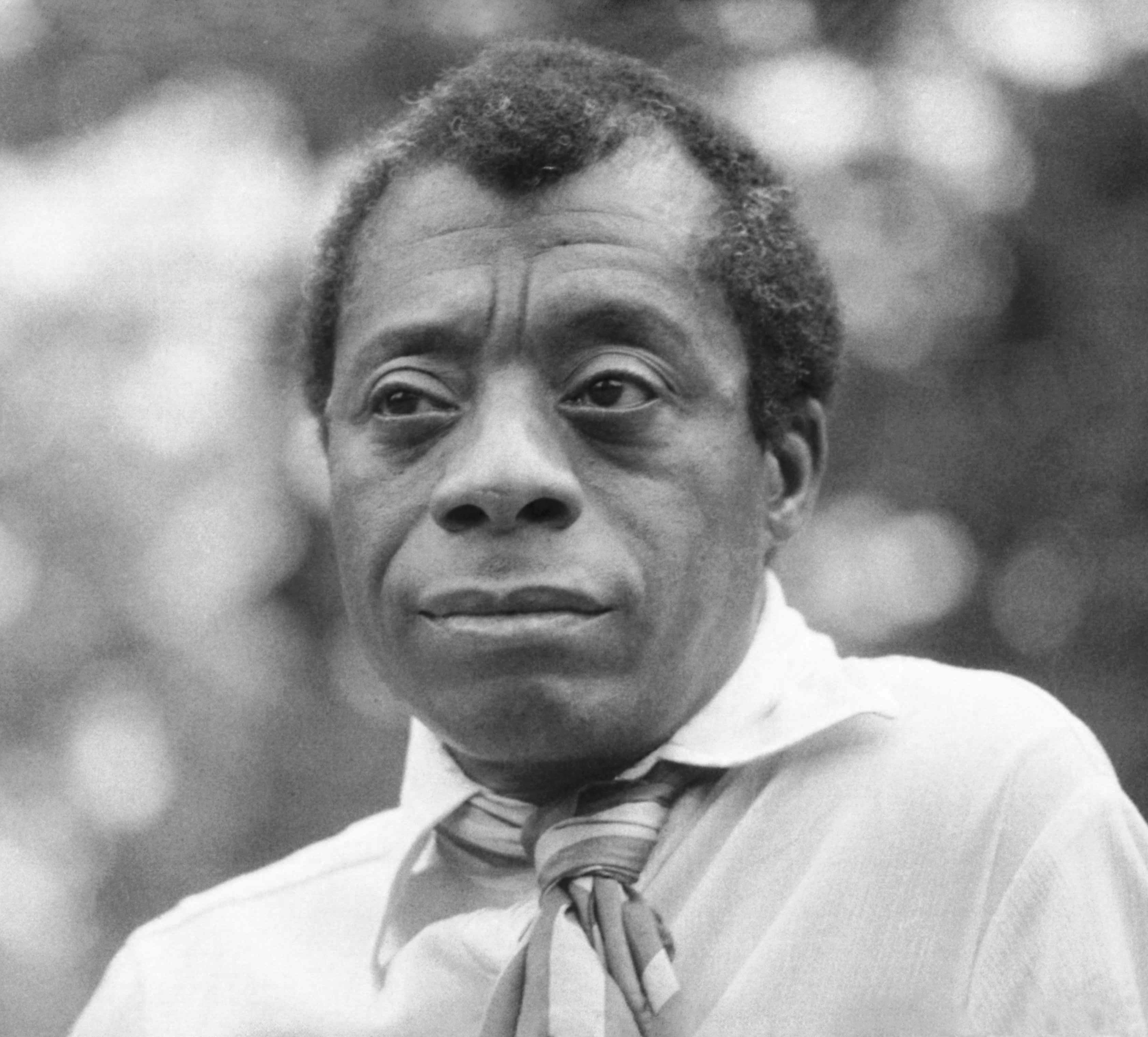
James Baldwin

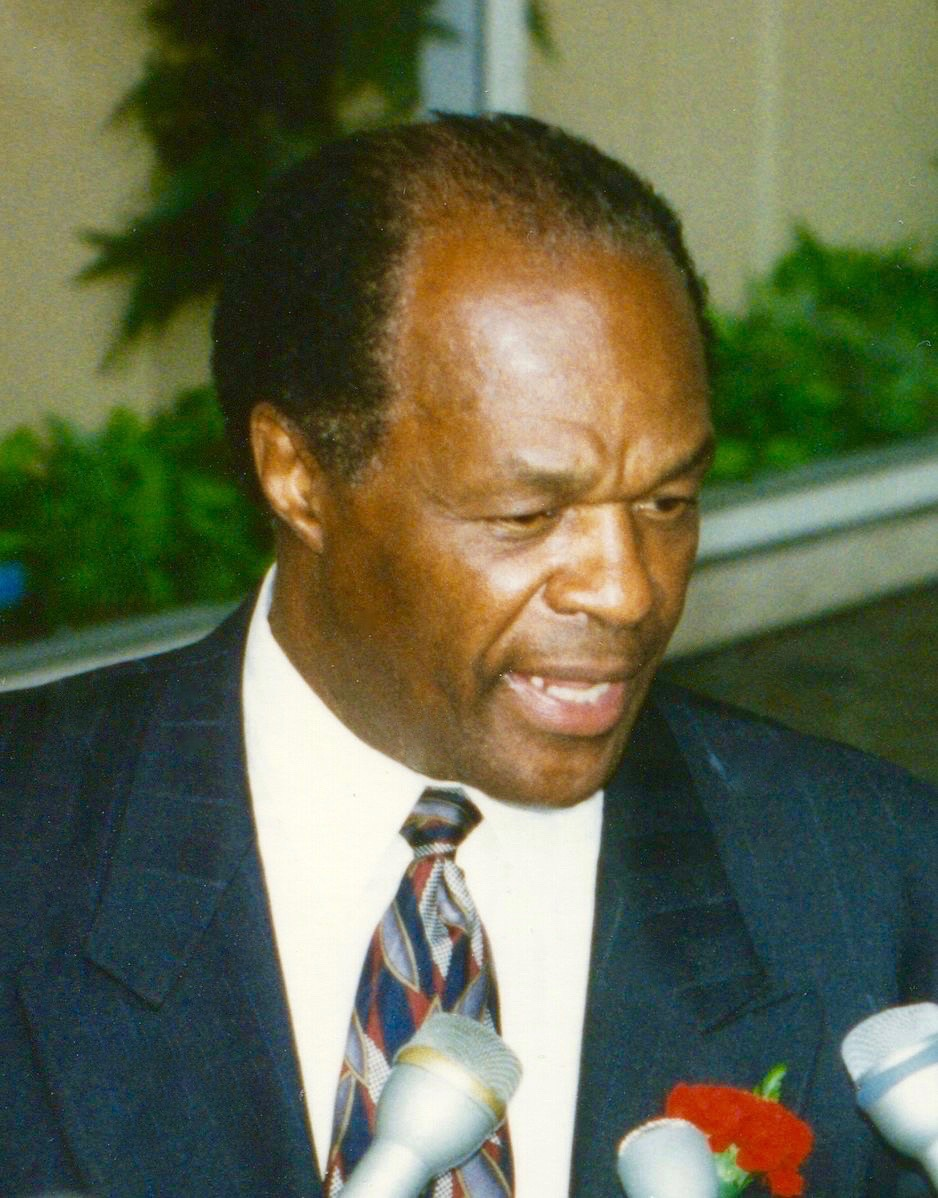
Marion Barry

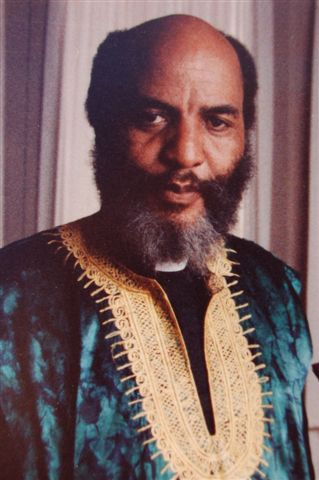
James Bevel

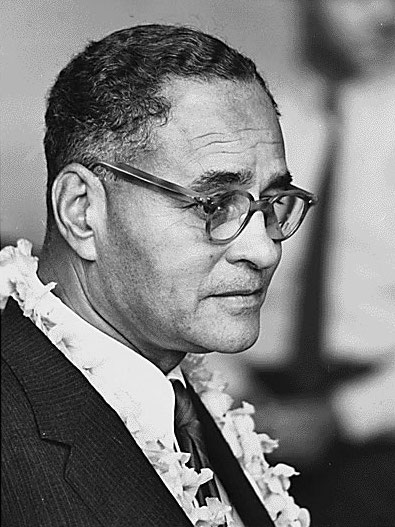
Ralph Bunche

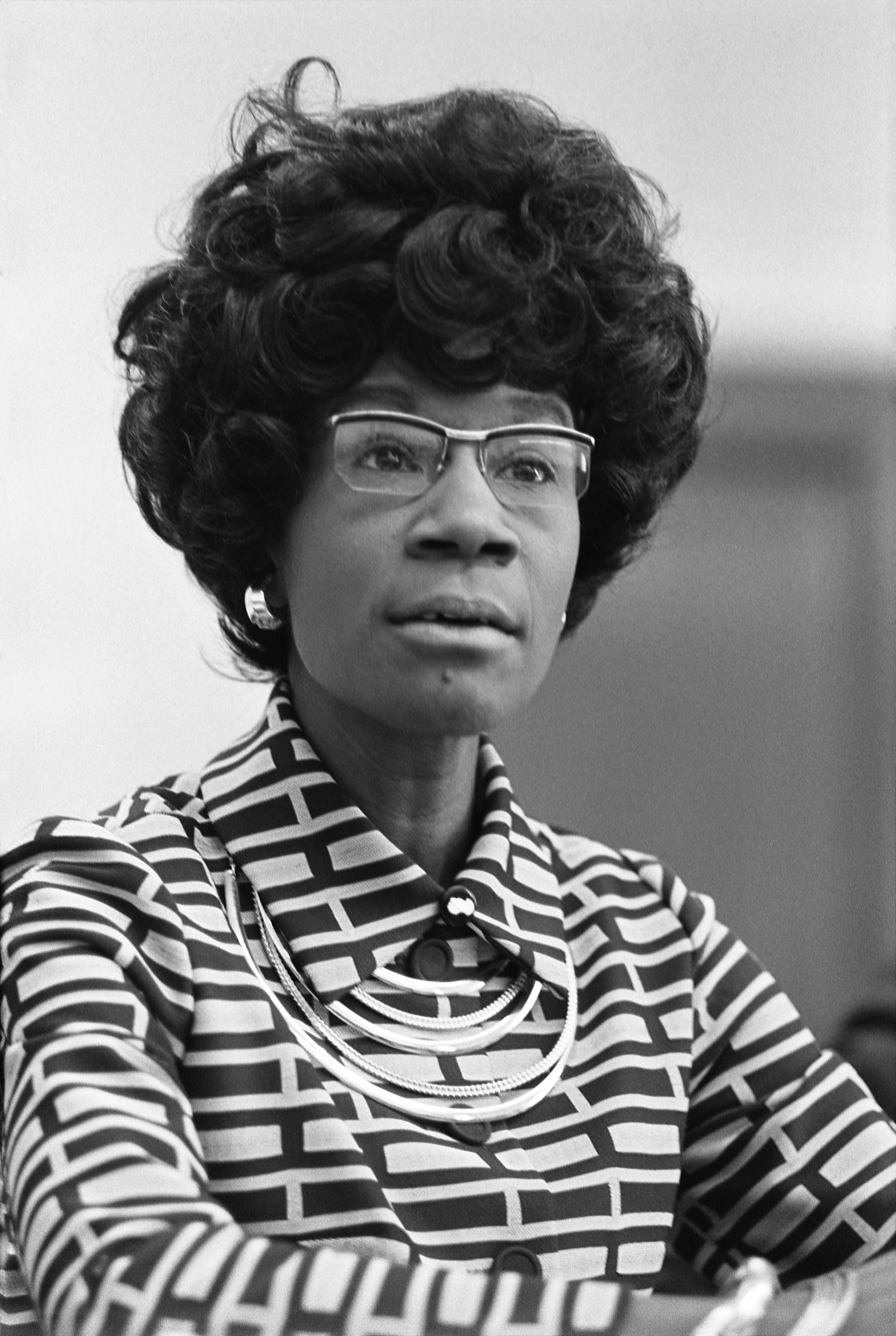
Shirley Chisholm

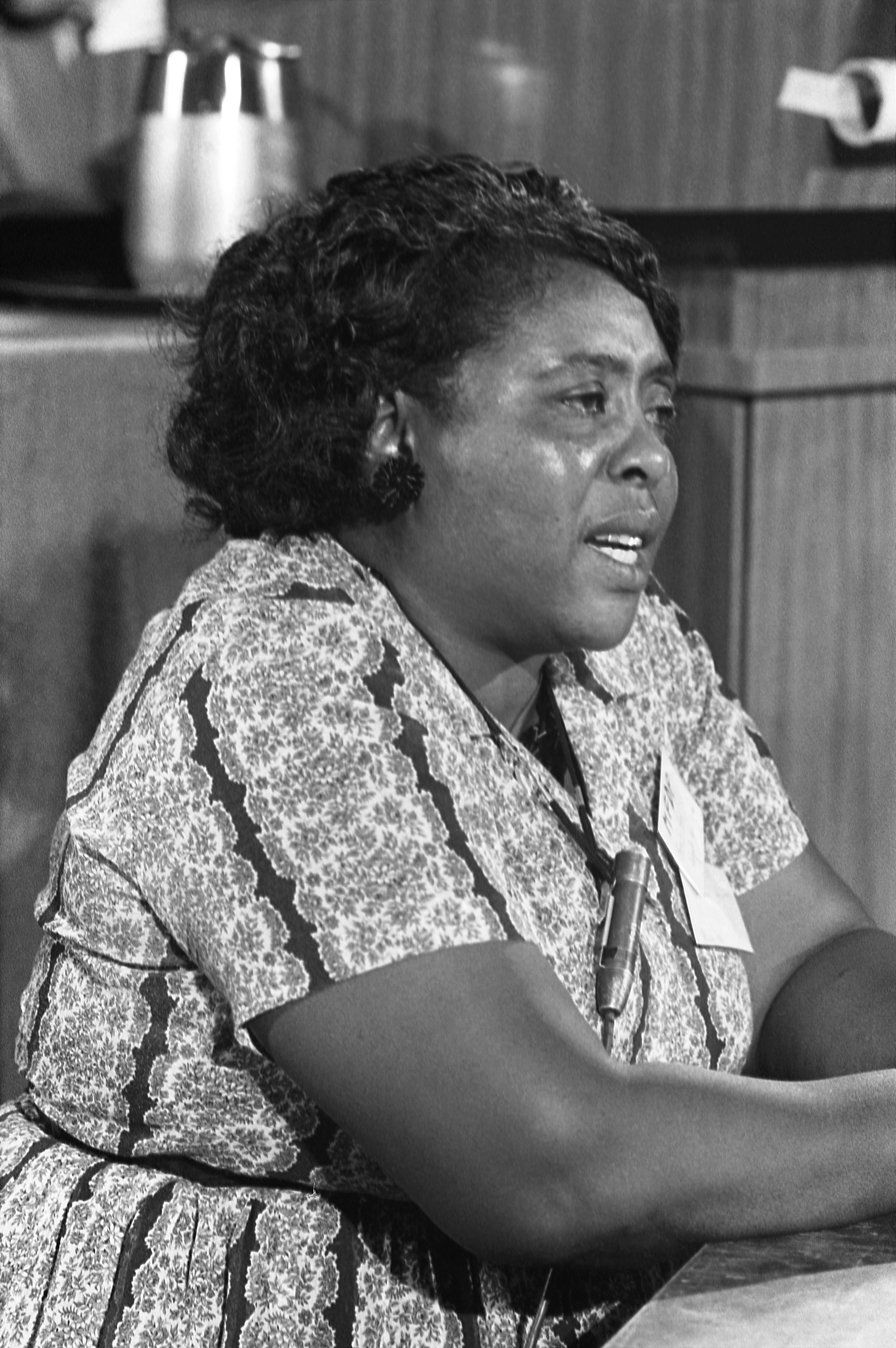
Fannie Lou Hamer

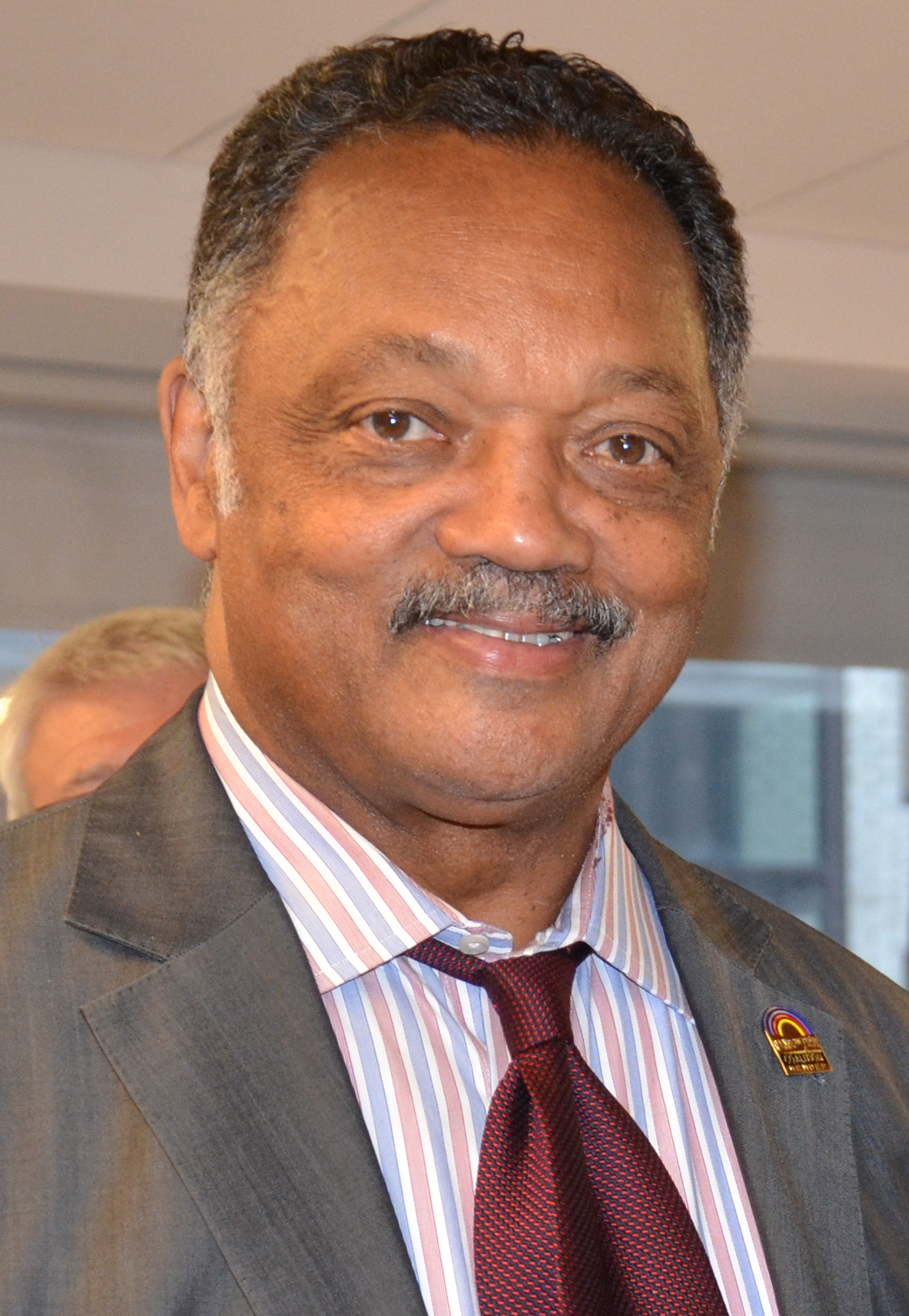
Jesse Jackson

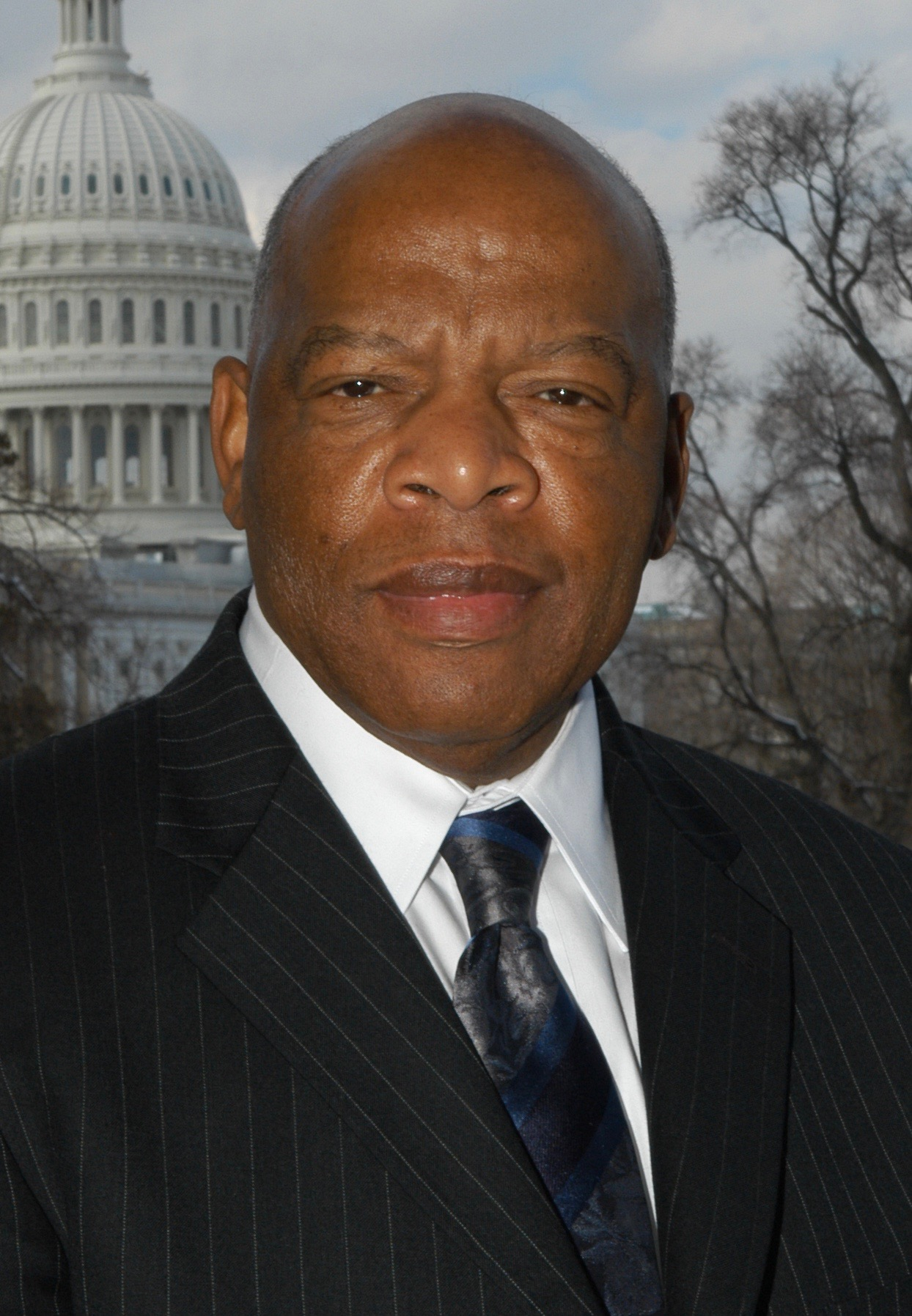
John Lewis

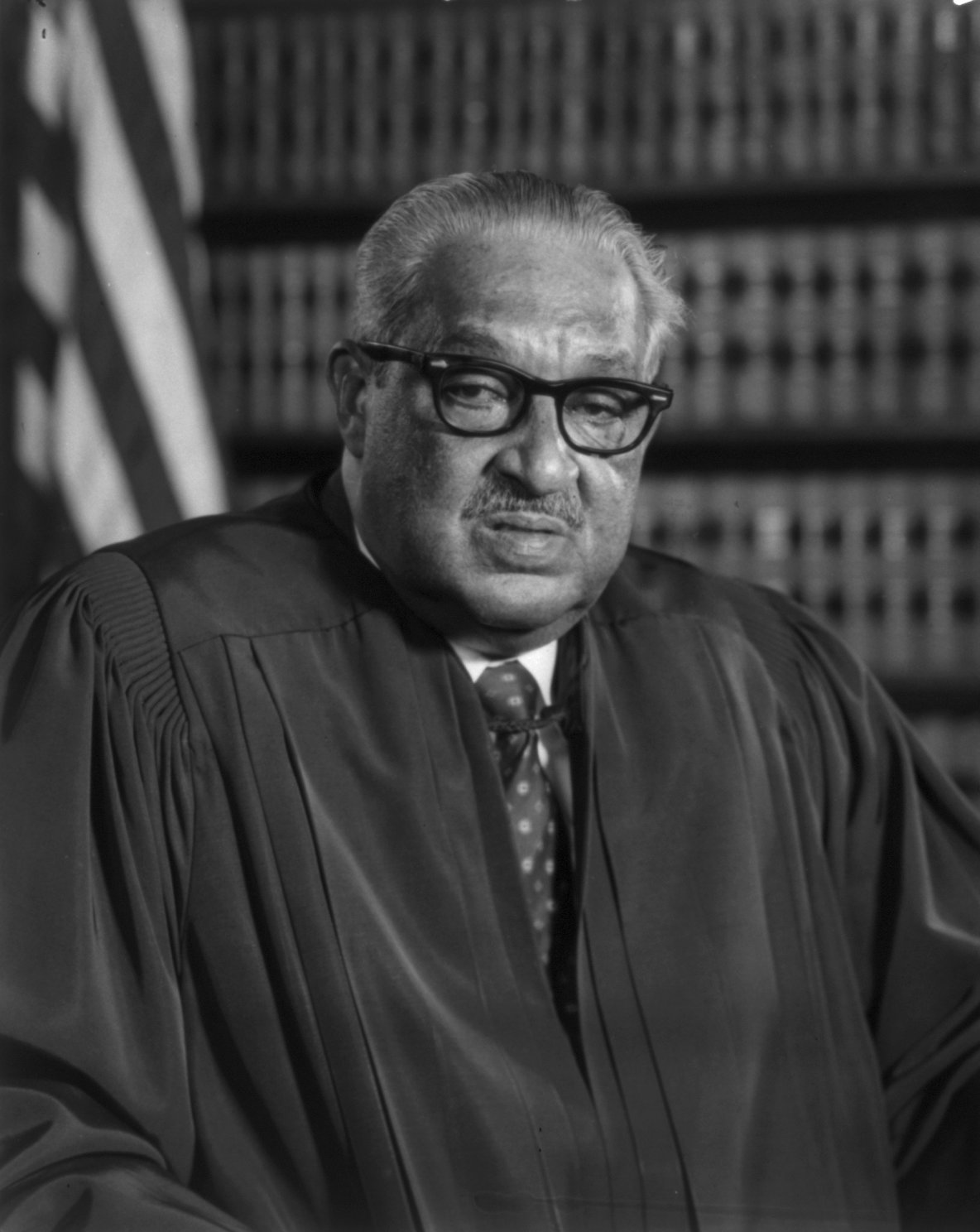
Thurgood Marshall

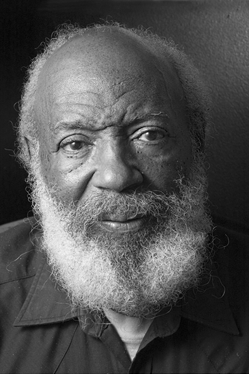
James Meredith

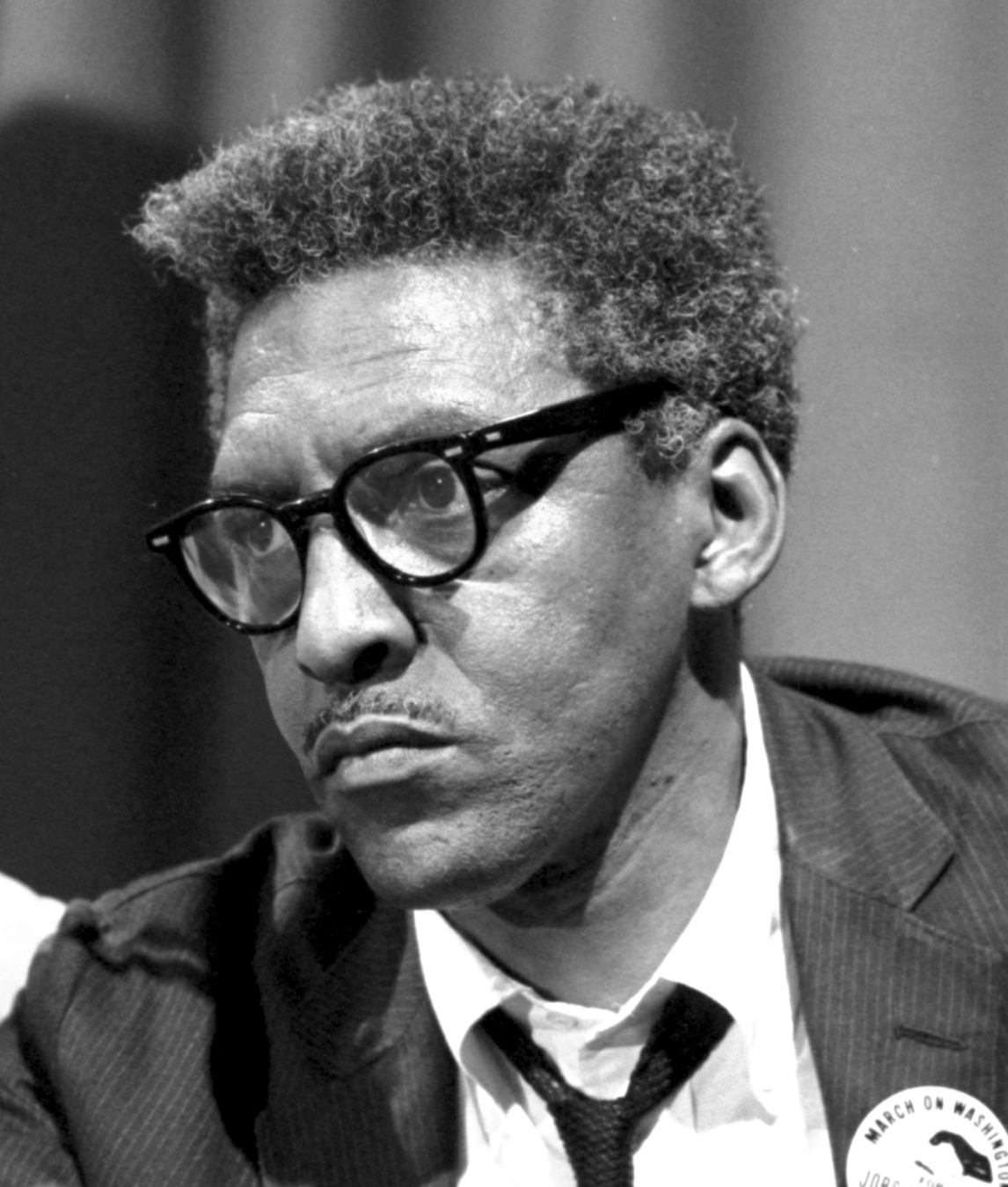
Bayard Rustin

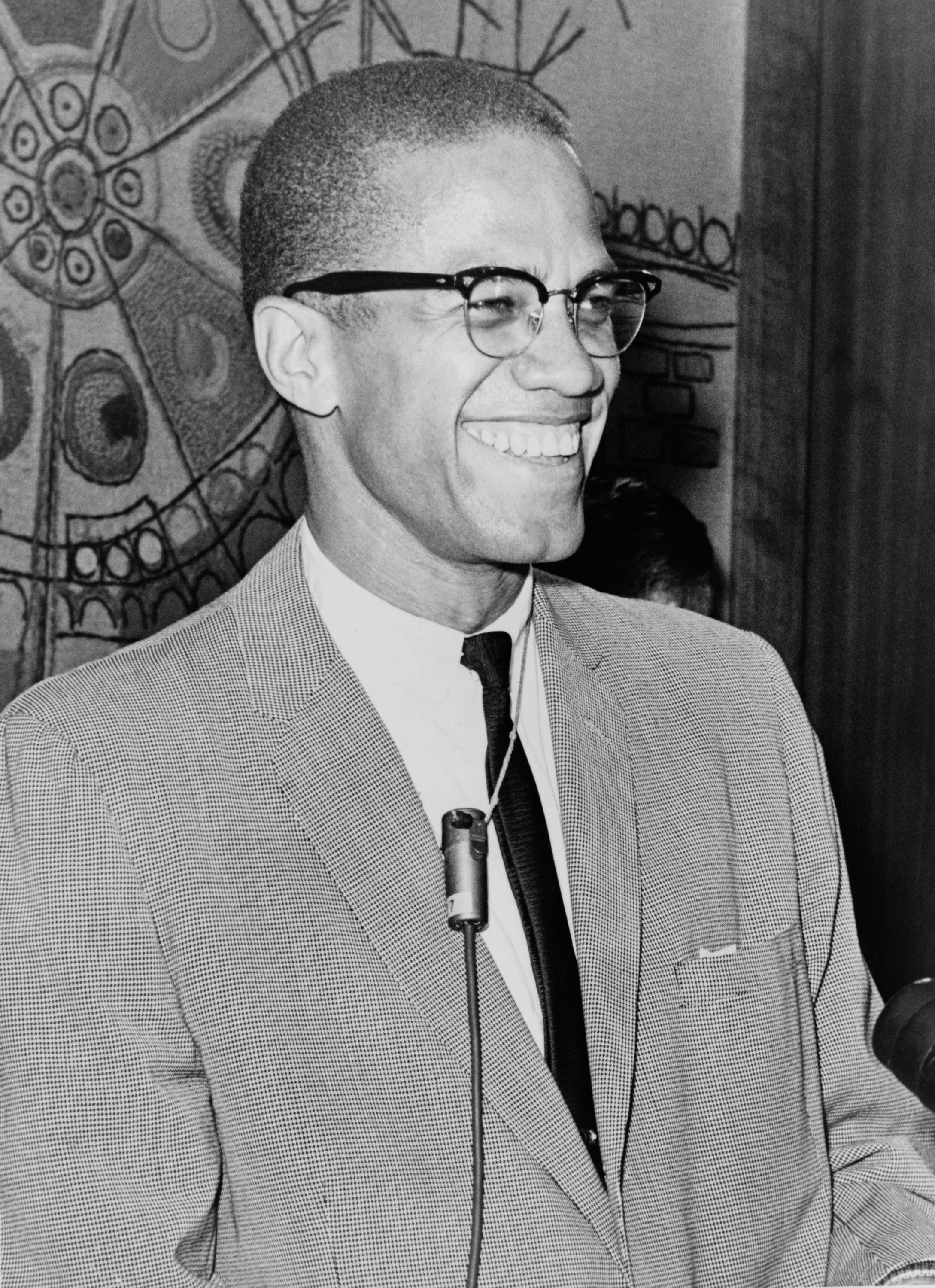
Malcolm X

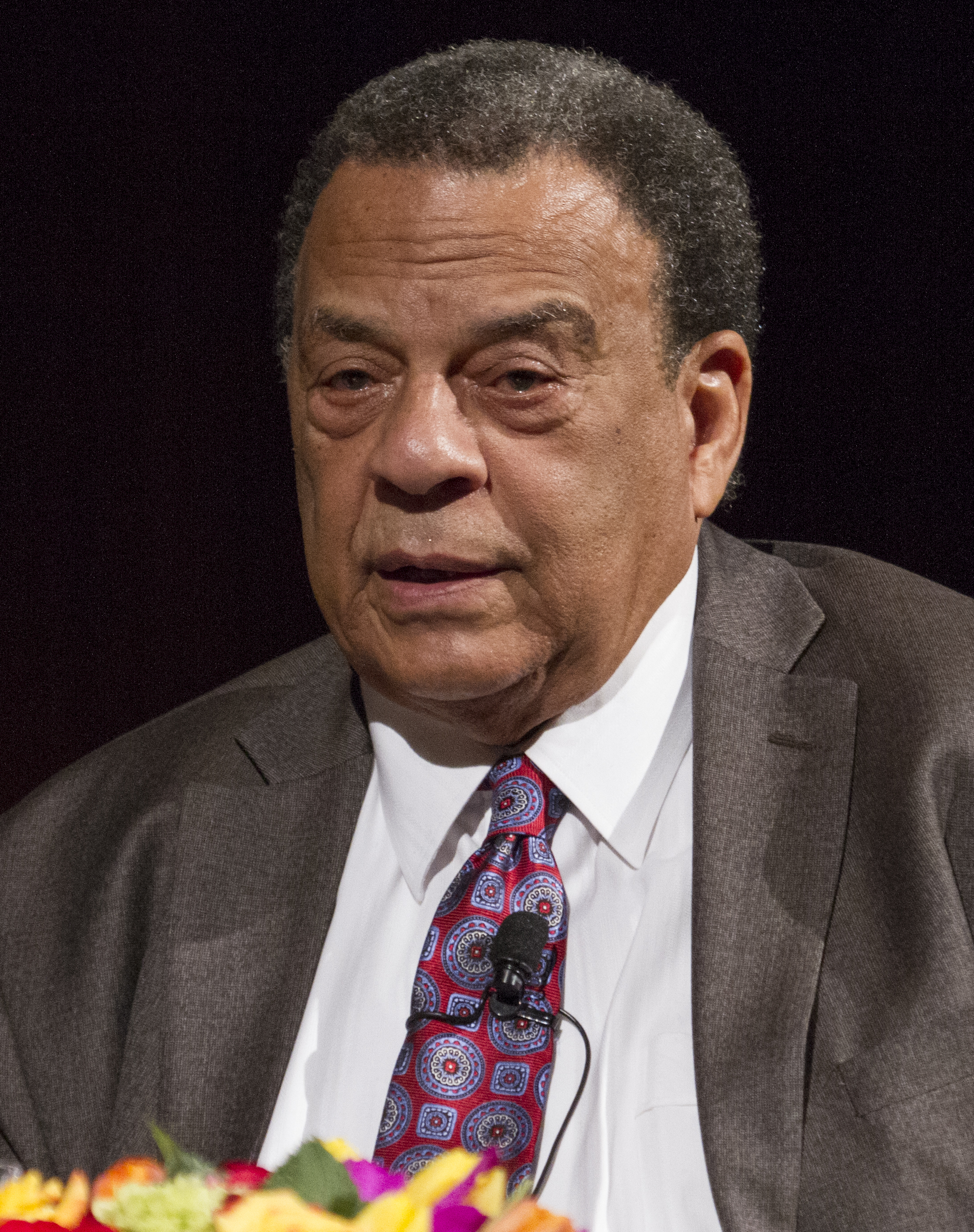
Andrew Young

=== A ===
- Thandiwe Abdullah, civil rights activist
- Ralph Abernathy, civil rights activist and minister
- Muhammad Ali, civil rights activist
- Naomi Anderson, civil and women's rights activist
- Maya Angelou, civil rights activist, writer, poet

=== B ===
- Ella Baker, civil rights activist
- Sarah Randolph Bailey, educator and Girl Scout pioneer
- James Baldwin, civil rights activist, novelist, playwright
- Marion Barry, civil rights activist, politician
- Daisy Bates, civil rights activist, publisher, journalist, lecturer
- Carl Bean, AIDS/HIV and LGBT activist and minister
- Arekia Bennett, voting rights activist
- Mary McLeod Bethune, civil rights activist, educator
- James Bevel, minister, leader of the civil rights movement
- Sojourner Truth, civil rights activist
- Gloria Blackwell, civil rights activist, educator
- Unita Blackwell, civil rights activist
- W. E. B. Du Bois, civil rights activist
- Julian Bond, civil rights activist, professor and writer
- Lillie Mae Bradford, civil rights activist
- Ruby Bridges, civil rights activist
- Aurelia Browder, civil rights activist
- Ralph Bunche, civil rights activist, scientist, academic, diplomat
- Dorothy Burnham, civil rights activist
- Louis Burnham, civil rights activist, journalist, editor of Freedom
- Nannie Helen Burroughs, civil and women's rights activist, educator, religious leader and businesswoman

=== C ===
- Melanie L. Campbell, voting rights activist
- Beatrice Morrow Cannady, civil rights activist, publisher
- Archibald Carey Jr., civil rights activist, lawyer, judge, politician, diplomat and clergyman
- Bunchy Carter, civil rights activist
- Christine Michel Carter, advocate for caregivers, specifically working mothers
- Jeannette Carter (1886–1964), lawyer, labor organizer, and suffragist
- Julius L. Chambers, civil rights activist
- Fannie Lee Chaney, civil rights activist
- James Chaney, civil rights activist
- Josie Brown Childs, civil right activist, civic leader
- Shirley Chisholm, civil rights activist, educator
- Xernona Clayton, civil rights activist
- Septima Poinsette Clark, civil rights activist, educator
- Eldridge Cleaver, civil rights activist
- Kathleen Cleaver, civil rights activist
- Charles E. Cobb Jr., civil rights activist, journalist, professor
- John Conyers, civil rights activist
- Vivian E. J. Cook, educator and activist
- Marvel Cooke, civil rights activist
- Annie Lee Cooper, civil rights activist
- Dorothy Cotton, civil rights activist
- Claudette Colvin, civil rights activist, nurse
- Anna J. Cooper, civil and women's rights activist, author, educator, sociologist, scholar
- John Anthony Copeland Jr., abolitionist
- Patrisse Cullors, civil rights activist, co-founder of the Black Lives Matter movement
- Elijah Cummings, civil rights advocate

=== D ===
- Angela Davis, civil rights activist, academic, and author
- Ossie Davis, civil rights activist
- William L. Dawson, civil rights activist, politician
- Ruby Dee, civil rights activist
- Doris Derby, civil rights activist, photographer
- Charles Diggs, civil rights activist
- Frederick Douglass, abolitionist, black rights activist, women's rights activist, organizer – February 20, 1895
- W. E. B. Du Bois, activist, writer, founder of NAACP

=== E ===
- Marian Wright Edelman, civil rights activist
- Soffiyah Eliijah, activist for prisoner rights
- Ruth Ellis, LGBT rights activist
- Keith Ellison, politician
- Theresa El-Amin, civil rights activist and union organizer
- Charles Evers, civil rights activist
- Medgar Evers, civil rights activist
- Myrlie Evers-Williams, civil rights activist

=== F ===
- David Fagen, civil rights and labor activist
- James L. Farmer Jr., civil rights activist
- Walter E. Fauntroy, civil rights activist
- Sarah Mae Flemming, civil rights activist
- James Forman, civil rights activist
- Aretha Franklin, civil rights activist
- C. L. Franklin, civil rights activist, minister
- Elizabeth Freeman, first former slave to win a freedom suit in Massachusetts
- Frankie Muse Freeman, civil rights activist, attorney

=== G ===
- Erica Garner, civil rights and Black Lives Matter activist
- Alicia Garza, co-founder of the Black Lives Matter movement
- Ernest Green, civil rights activist, part of the Little Rock Nine
- Fred Gray, civil rights lawyer
- Shields Green, abolitionist
- Dick Gregory, civil rights activist
- Vicki Garvin, civil rights activist

=== H ===
- Vincent Harding, civil rights activist, historian
- Craig G. Harris, HIV/AIDS and LGBT activist, writer, poet
- Curtis W. Harris, civil rights activist, minister, politician
- Fannie Lou Hamer, civil rights activist
- Fred Hampton, civil rights activist
- Lorraine Hansberry, civil rights activist, playwright, author
- Frances Harper, abolitionist and women's rights activist
- Robert Hayling, civil rights activist, dentist
- Lola Hendricks, civil rights activist, secretary
- Aaron Henry, civil rights activist, politician
- Dorothy Height, educator and civil rights activist
- Benjamin Hooks, civil rights activist, minister, attorney
- Lena Horne, civil rights activist
- Elbert Howard, civil rights activist
- T. R. M. Howard, civil rights leader, entrepreneur, surgeon
- Langston Hughes, civil rights activist, poet, social activist, novelist, playwright, and columnist
- Bobby Hutton, civil rights activist
- Nipsey Hussle, community activist

=== I ===
- Rizza Islam, civil rights activist, member of the Nation of Islam

=== J ===
- George Jackson, civil rights activist, author
- Jesse Jackson, civil rights activist
- Jimmie Lee Jackson, civil rights activist
- Mahalia Jackson, civil rights activist
- Marsha P. Johnson, civil rights activist
- Richie Jean Jackson, civil rights activist, author, teacher
- T. J. Jemison, civil rights activist, minister
- James Weldon Johnson, writer of Black National Anthem
- Alberta Odell Jones, civil rights lawyer
- Clarence B. Jones, civil rights activist
- Quincy Jones, civil rights activist
- Barbara Jordan, civil rights activist
- Vernon Jordan, civil rights activist

=== K ===
- Colin Kaepernick, BLM activist, former football player
- Sarah Louise Keys, civil rights activist
- Nupol Kiazolu, civil rights and homelessness activist
- A. D. King, civil rights activist
- Alveda King, civil rights activist, author, politician
- Bernice King, civil rights activist, minister
- Coretta Scott King, civil rights activist
- Dexter King, civil rights activist
- Martin Luther King III, civil rights activist
- Martin Luther King Jr., civil rights leader and pastor
- Martin Luther King Sr., civil rights leader, pastor and missionary
- Alberta Williams King, civil rights activist
- Yolanda King, civil rights activist
- Eartha Kitt, civil rights activist

=== L ===
- Bernard Lafayette, civil rights activist, organizer
- Sarah Willie Layton, suffragist, civil rights activist
- James Lawson, civil rights activist, professor
- John Lewis, congressman, Nashville Student Movement, organizer
- Audre Lorde, civil rights activist, feminist, poet, author
- Joseph Lowery, civil rights activist and minister
- Julius Lester, civil rights activist, author, professor
- Conrad Lynn, civil rights activist, lawyer
- Earl Lloyd, first African American NBA player (professional basketball player) Desegregated the NBA

=== M ===
- Thurgood Marshall, civil rights activist, lawyer, judge
- Benjamin Mays, civil rights activist, minister
- Franklin McCain, civil rights activist
- DeRay Mckesson, civil rights activist, podcaster
- Floyd McKissick, civil rights activist, lawyer
- John Berry Meachum, civil rights activist, educator, religious leader, involved in the Underground Railroad
- James Meredith, civil rights figure, writer, political adviser
- Anne Moody, civil rights activist, author
- Brittany Chrishawn Moore, anti-police brutality activists
- Harry T. Moore, civil rights activist, educator
- Harriette Moore, civil rights worker, educator
- Amzie Moore, civil rights leader, entrepreneur
- Irene Morgan, anti-segregation activist
- Sara Mokuria, police brutality activist, educator
- Bob Moses, civil rights activist, educator
- Elijah Muhammad, civil rights leader
- Khalid Abdul Muhammad, black nationalist leader, minister
- Pauli Murray, civil rights activist, lawyer, author, priest

=== N ===
- Diane Nash, civil rights activist
- Dangerfield Newby, abolitionist
- Huey P. Newton, civil rights activist
- Bree Newsome, activist, filmmaker
- Denise Nicholas, civil rights activist
- Nellie B. Nicholson, suffragist
- E. D. Nixon, civil rights activist, NCAAP official

=== O ===
- James Orange, civil rights activist
- Sarah Massey Overton, women's rights activist

=== P ===
- Rosa Parks, activist, NCAAP official, Montgomery Bus Boycott inspiration
- Lucy Parsons, activist, labor organizer
- James Peck, civil rights activist
- William Pleasant Jr., civil rights activist
- Adam Clayton Powell Jr., civil rights activist, pastor
- Gloria Johnson-Powell, civil rights activist
- Elizabeth Piper Ensley, educator and suffragist
- Jewel Prestage, activist, political scientist

=== R ===
- Lincoln Ragsdale, civil rights activist, aviator
- A. Philip Randolph, civil rights activist
- Emma J. Ray, civil rights and social activist, suffragist
- George Raymond, civil rights activist
- George Raymond Jr., civil rights activist
- Frederick D. Reese, civil rights activist, educator, minister
- Gloria Richardson, civil rights activist
- David Richmond, civil rights activist
- Paul Robeson, civil rights activist
- Amelia Boynton Robinson, civil rights activist
- Jackie Robinson, civil rights activist
- Jo Ann Robinson, civil rights activist
- Bayard Rustin, civil rights activist
- Josephine St. Pierre Ruffin, civil rights activist

=== S ===
- Bobby Seale, political activist and author
- Cleveland Sellers, civil rights activist, educator
- Betty Shabazz, civil rights activist
- Al Sharpton, civil rights activist, minister
- Mary Ann Shadd, anti-slavery activist, journalist, lawyer
- Charles Sherrod, civil rights activist, minister
- Fred Shuttlesworth, civil rights activist
- Mary Louise Smith, civil rights activist
- Nina Simone, civil rights activist
- Mavis Staples, civil rights activist
- Marion Stamps, civil rights and housing rights activist
- Charles Kenzie Steele, civil rights activist
- Charles Steele Jr., civil rights activist, politician
- Bryan Stevenson, criminal justice reform activist
- Tupac Shakur, black America activist, iniquity

=== T ===
- Sojourner Truth, abolitionist and suffragist
- Harriet Tubman, abolitionist and humanitarian
- Samuel Wilbert Tucker, civil rights activist, lawyer

=== V ===
- C. T. Vivian, civil rights activist, author, minister

=== W ===
- Madam C. J. Walker, political and social activist, entrepreneur, philanthropist
- Wyatt Tee Walker, pastor, civil rights leader
- Booker T. Washington, educator, founder of Tuskegee University
- Ida B. Wells, civil rights activist, co-founder of the NAACP
- Cornel West, civil rights activist, philosopher, author, minister
- Roy Wilkins, civil rights activist
- Hosea Williams, civil rights activist, minister, businessman, philanthropist, scientist, politician
- Robert F. Williams, civil rights leader, author
- Bobby E. Wright, political activist, psychologist, scholar

=== X ===
- Malcolm X, human rights activist, minister

=== Y ===
- Andrew Young, politician, diplomat, and activist
- Whitney Young, civil rights activist
- Sammy Younge Jr., civil rights activist
