= Jack Gentry =

Jack Gentry may refer to:

- Jack Gentry (English cricketer)
- Jack Gentry (South African cricketer)
- Jack Gentry (entrepreneur)
