= List of people from Springfield, Missouri =

This is a list of notable people born in, residents of, or otherwise closely associated with the city of Springfield, Missouri and its surrounding metropolitan area.

== Arts, literature, humanities and entertainment ==
- Lennie Aleshire, vaudeville and country music performer
- Bob Barker, game show host (The Price is Right)
- Daya Betty, drag queen, finalist on season 14 of RuPaul's Drag Race
- Julie Blackmon, photographer
- Aaron Buerge, star of ABC's The Bachelor, season 2
- Kristi Capel Miss Missouri 2006, anchor for WJW in Cleveland
- Kim Crosby, Broadway performer
- Ian Eskelin, lead singer of All Star United
- William Garwood, actor
- Lucas Grabeel, actor, singer (High School Musical, High School Musical 2, and High School Musical 3: Senior Year)
- Percy Grainger, music composer (lived in Springfield from 1940 to 1943)
- Sara Groves, Christian contemporary recording artist
- Tess Harper, actress (graduated from Missouri State University)
- David L. Harrison, children's author and poet
- Speedy Haworth, guitarist and singer
- Grace Hayes, actress
- Joe Haymes, swing era bandleader-arranger (born in Marshfield; grew up and began his band in Springfield)
- Josh Heinrichs, reggae singer
- Virginia Hunter, actress
- Melissa Hutchison, two-time BAFTA nominee
- Jah Roots, reggae band
- Jay Kenneth Johnson, actor (Days of Our Lives)
- The Jordanaires, singing group
- Johnny Q. Public, rock band
- Juto, singer
- David Kershenbaum, record producer
- King's X, musical group
- Chandler Lawson, beauty pageant titleholder, Miss Tennessee 2012
- Brenda Lee, singer, Grammy Award winner
- Jim Lowe, country music singer
- Robin Luke, musician
- The Marksmen, singing quartet (originally The Foggy River Boys)
- Duard Marshall, painter, lithographer, and student of Thomas Hart Benton
- Mariann Mayberry, actress
- Crystal Methyd, drag queen, finalist on season 12 of RuPaul's Drag Race
- The Ozark Mountain Daredevils, musical group
- The Philharmonics, singing quintet
- Brad Pitt, actor, attended Kickapoo High School, Oscar, Golden Globe Award and Primetime Emmy Award winner
- Mary Ellen Ray, actress
- Chappell Roan, singer-songwriter
- Jake Wesley Rogers, singer
- Artie Romero, cartoonist, animator
- Ronnie Self, singer/songwriter
- Si Siman, music producer and broadcast executive
- Someone Still Loves You Boris Yeltsin, musical group
- Cailee Spaeny, actress (Priscilla, Alien: Romulus)
- Speakeasy, rock and roll band
- Heidi Strobel, Survivor contestant
- Terre Thaemlitz, musician, cultural producer
- Tony Tost, poet
- Kathleen Turner, actress, two-time Golden Globe Award winner
- Speedy West, steel guitarist and record producer
- Robert Westenberg, Broadway performer
- Marissa Whitley, Miss Teen USA 2001
- Tom Whitlock, Academy Award winner for Best Original Song, "Take My Breath Away"
- Adrienne Wilkinson, actress (graduated from Kickapoo High School)
- Lanford Wilson, playwright
- Slim Wilson, musician, radio and TV personality
- Daniel Woodrell, author
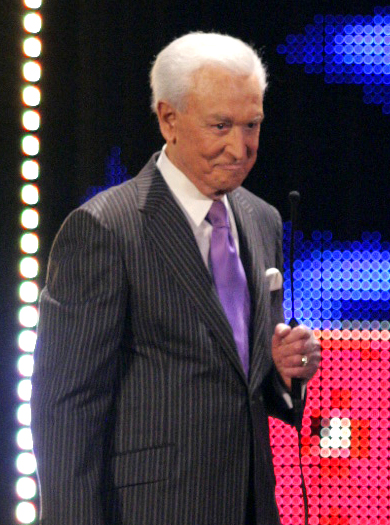
Bob Barker

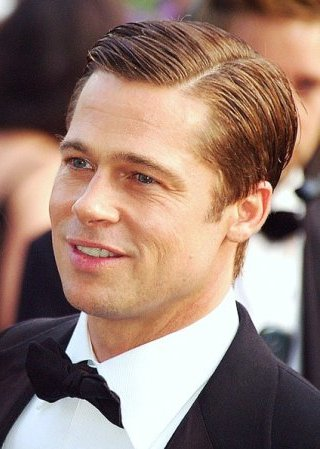
Brad Pitt

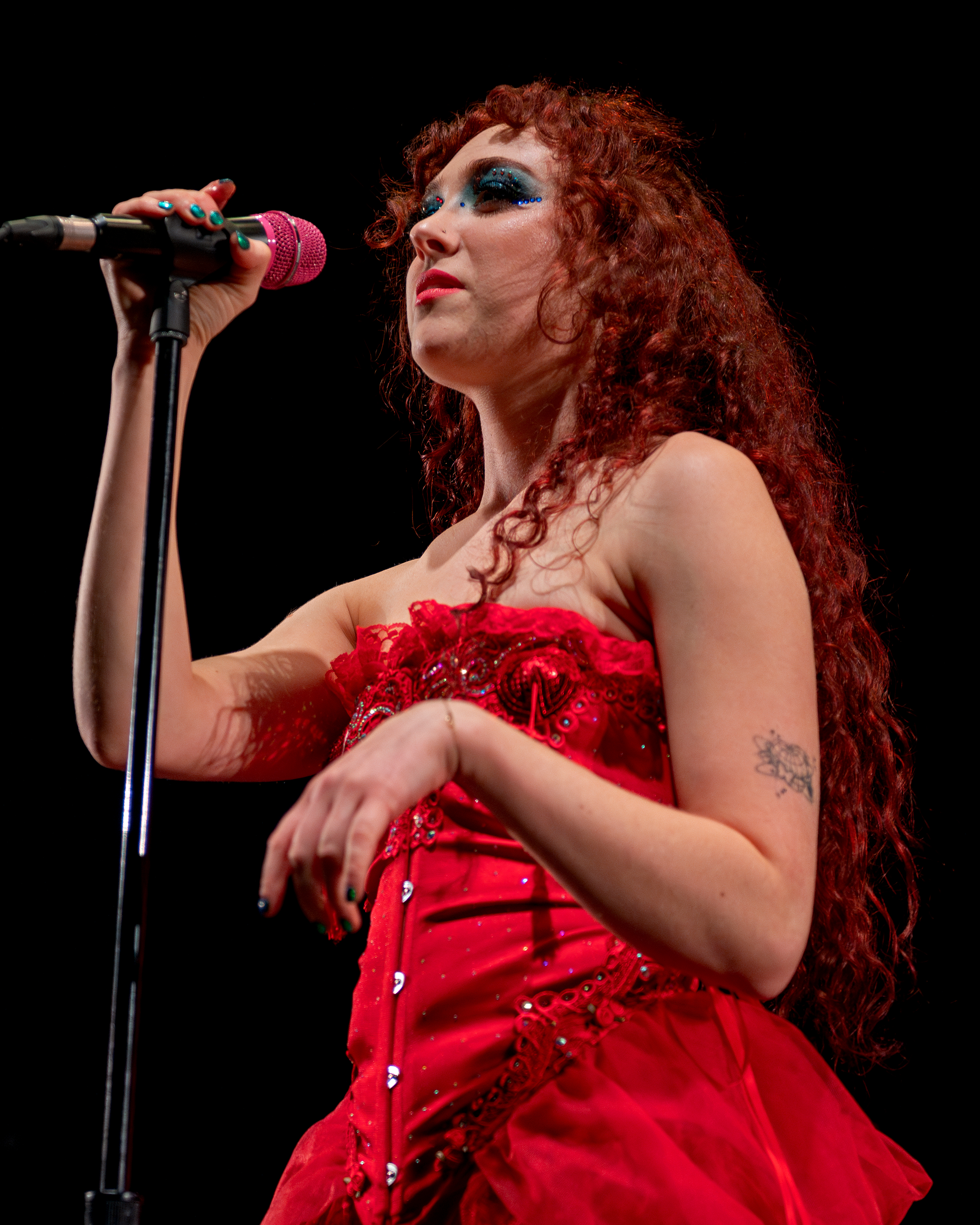
Chappell Roan

== Business ==
- William F. Austin, CEO of Starkey Hearing Technologies
- Ernest R. Breech, chairman of Ford
- Lester E. Cox, businessman, namesake of CoxHealth
- Ralph D. Foster, broadcasting pioneer
- Jack Gentry, World War II and Korean War veteran; founder of Positronic
- David Glass, former CEO of Walmart; owner of MLB's Kansas City Royals
- John Morris, founder and majority owner, Bass Pro Shops
- Jack Stack, founder of SRC Holdings
- Byron Trott, investment banker
- John T. Woodruff, businessman, founder of Route 66
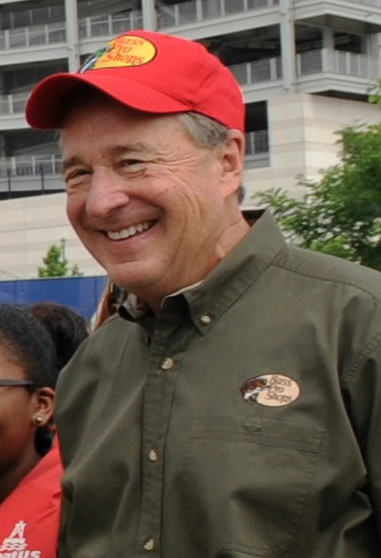
Johnny Morris

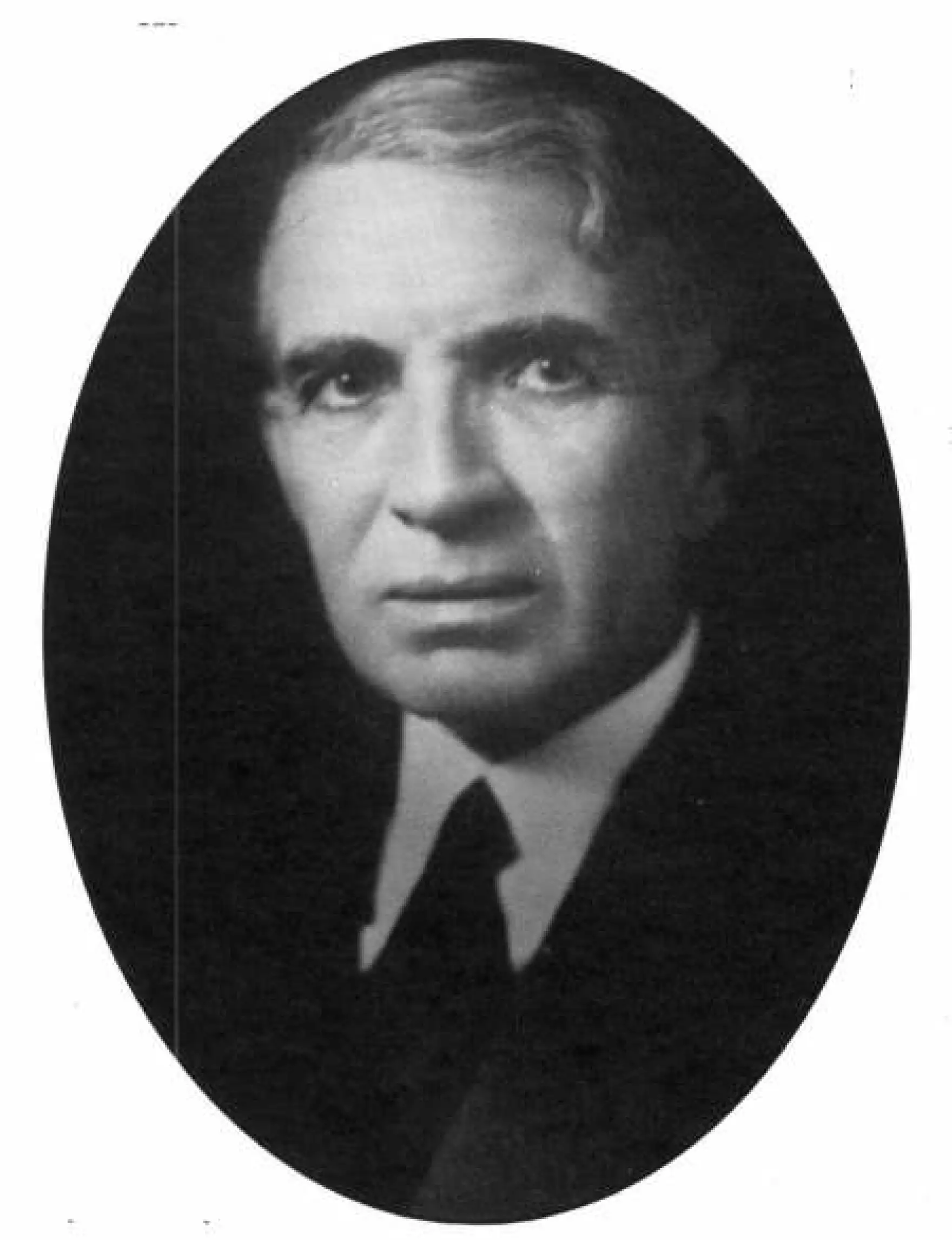
John T. Woodruff

== Education ==
- James E. Cofer, professor at Missouri State University, president 2010–11
- J. Alan Groves, Biblical Hebrew scholar; editor of Groves-Wheeler Hebrew morphology database
- Curtis Price KBE, warden of New College, Oxford

== Politics ==
- John Ashcroft, former United States attorney general
- Matt Blunt, former governor of Missouri
- Melanie Blunt, former first lady of Missouri
- Roy Blunt, former U.S. senator
- Dennis Bonner, Missouri state legislator
- Sempronius H. Boyd, former U.S. representative and minister of the United States to Siam
- Charlie Brown, former U.S. representative
- Eric Burlison, U.S. representative for Missouri
- Miller Dunckel, former Michigan state treasurer
- Mark A. Ediger, former Surgeon General of the United States Air Force
- Johnny Ellis, Alaska state legislator
- Scott Fitzpatrick, state auditor of Missouri and former state treasurer of Missouri
- Betsy Fogle, member of the Missouri House of Representatives
- M. Douglas Harpool, United States district judge
- Stephanie Hein, member of the Missouri House of Representatives
- Gilbert H. Jertberg, United States circuit judge
- Jim Keet, former member of both houses of the Arkansas legislature; the 2010 Republican gubernatorial nominee in Arkansas
- Margaret Kelly, former Missouri state auditor, Missouri republican gubernatorial nominee
- Billy Long, former commissioner of the Internal Revenue Service
- James McBride, former minister of the United States to Hawaii
- Roscoe C. Patterson, former U.S. senator and representative
- John S. Phelps, former governor of Missouri
- W. Brent Powell, chief justice of the Missouri Supreme Court
- William C. Price, former treasurer of the United States
- Crystal Quade, minority leader, Missouri House of Representatives, Missouri democratic gubernatorial nominee
- Alex Riley, member of the Missouri House of Representatives
- Alfred C. Sikes, former chairman of the Federal Communications Commission
- Karen L. Williams, former United States Ambassador to Suriname
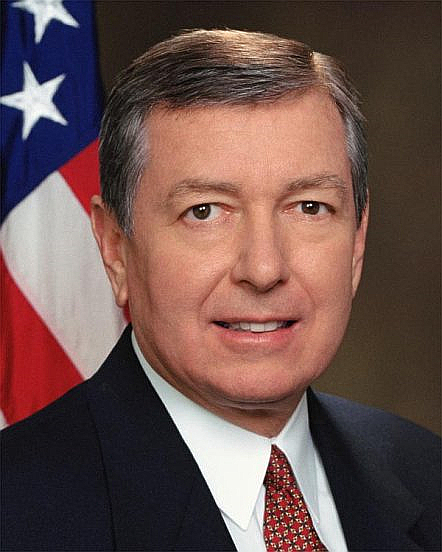
John Ashcroft

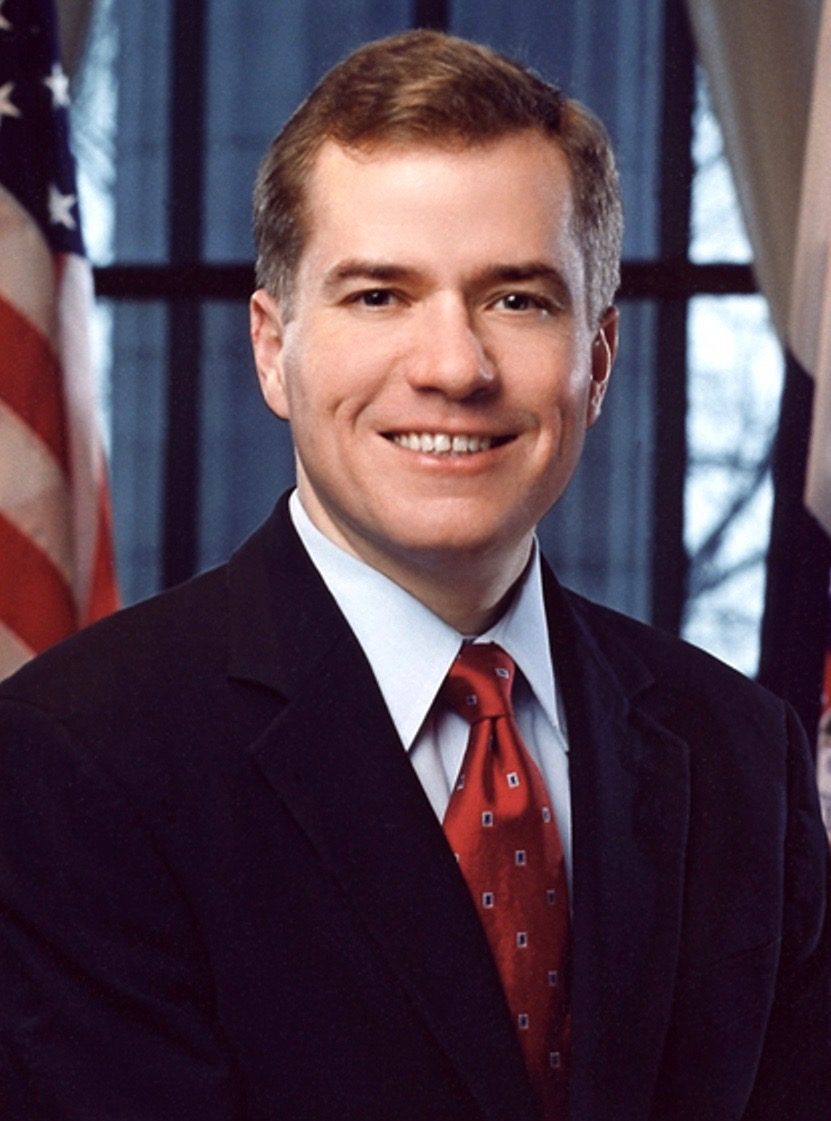
Matt Blunt

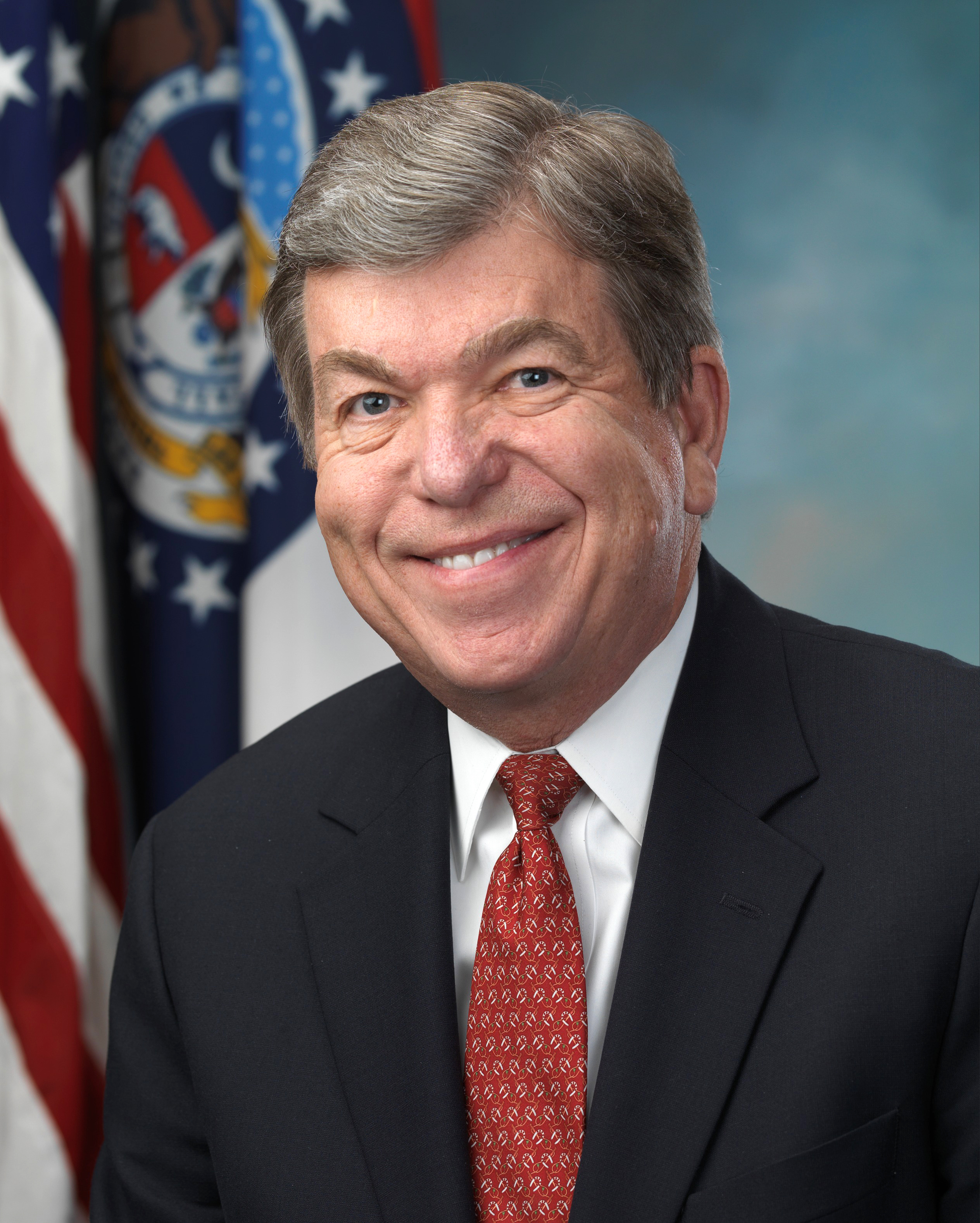
Roy Blunt

== Science ==
- Jerry L. Atwood, chemist
- Edwin P. Hubble, of Hubble Space Telescope fame (born in Marshfield)
- Janet Kavandi, NASA astronaut
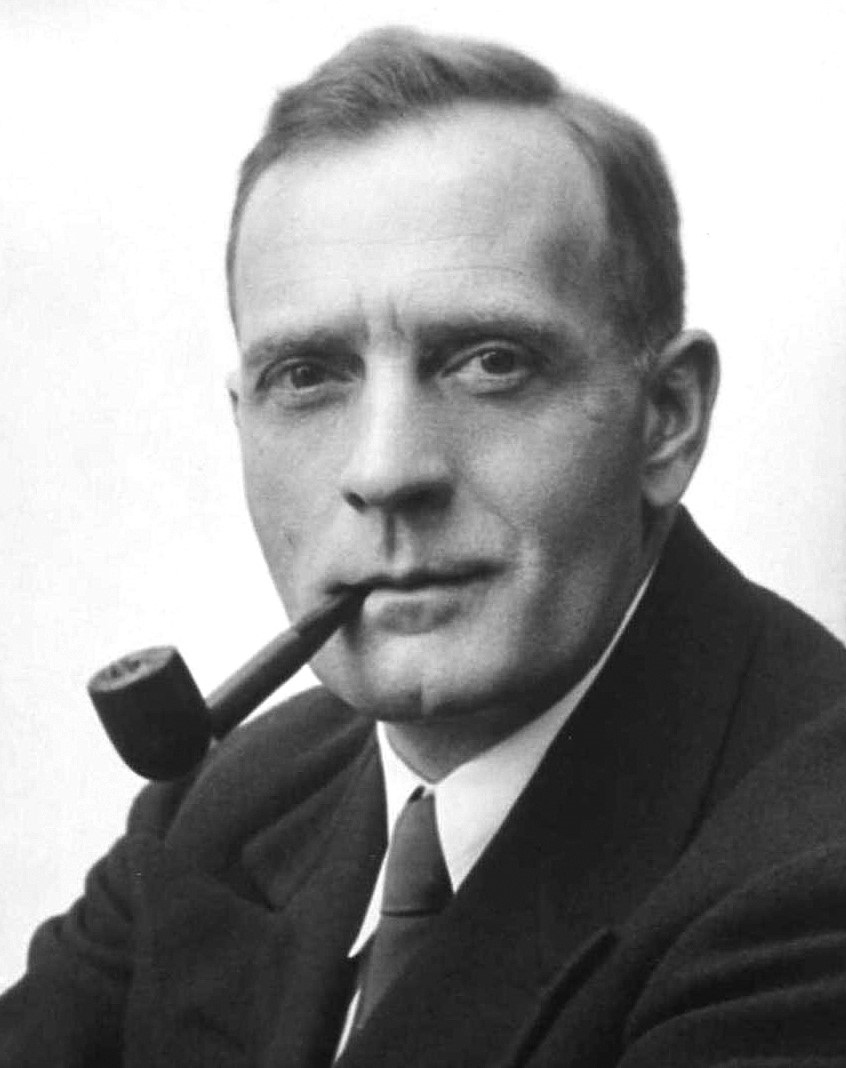
Edwin Hubble

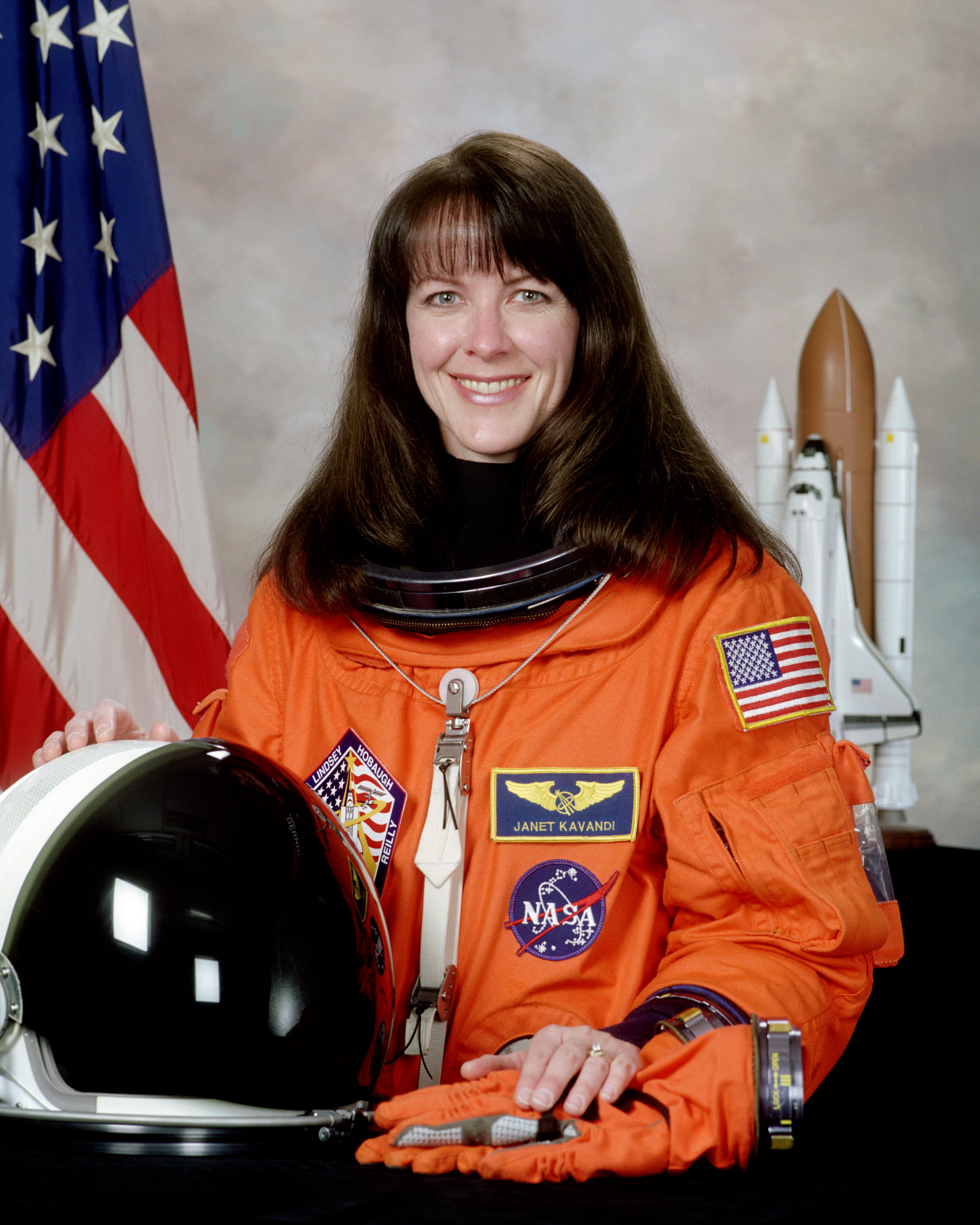
Janet L. Kavandi

== Sports ==
- Jaelon Acklin, CFL player, Ottawa Redblacks
- Scott Bailes, MLB pitcher in 1980s and 1990s; color commentator for Springfield Cardinals
- Eddie Carnett, MLB pitcher in 1940s
- Dean Deetz, MLB player, Houston Astros
- Lori Endicott, Atlanta 1996 Olympic volleyball player
- BJ Flores, boxer
- Courtney Frerichs, Rio 2016 and Tokyo 2020 track and field
- Gracie Gold, Sochi 2014 Olympic figure skater, 2014 and 2016 U.S. champion
- Dorial Green-Beckham, NFL player, 2015 Tennessee Titans, 2016 Philadelphia Eagles
- Lucas Harrell, MLB player, Toronto Blue Jays
- John Howard, Mexico City 1968, Munich 1972, Montreal 1976 cycalist
- Ryan Howard, MLB player, 2005 NL Rookie of the Year, 2006 Home Run Derby champion, 2006 NL Most Valuable Player; played at Missouri State University
- Jack Jewsbury, MLS player for Portland Timbers
- Jerry Jones, Dallas Cowboys owner; worked in Springfield with father Pat Jones at insurance company Modern Security Life in 1960s
- Josh Kinney, first Springfield Cardinal (AA) to make MLB St. Louis Cardinals roster
- Ashlyn Krueger, tennis player
- Dale Long, MLB baseball player
- Stan Musial, Hall of Fame baseball player for St. Louis Cardinals, played for original Springfield Cardinals in late 1930s
- Larry Nemmers, NFL referee
- Mickey Owen, MLB player
- Robin Partch, Grenoble 1968 luger
- Dave Patterson, MLB player, Los Angeles Dodgers
- Jason Pyrah, Atlanta 1996 and Sydney 2000 Olympic 1500m runner
- Steve Rogers, MLB starting pitcher, 5-time All-Star; most successful pitcher in Montreal Expos history
- Emily Scott, Sochi 2014 Olympic speed skater
- Horton Smith, golfer, two-time Masters Tournament champion
- Payne Stewart, professional golfer
- Jeri Sitzes, boxer
- Anthony Tolliver, NBA player for 13 seasons, 2008 –2021
- Paul Walker, football player
- Trevon Brazile, current NBA player
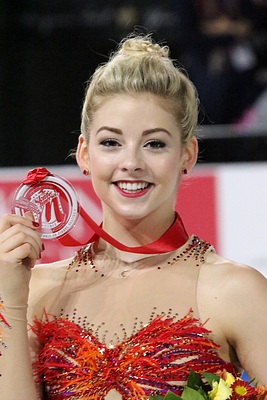
Gracie Gold

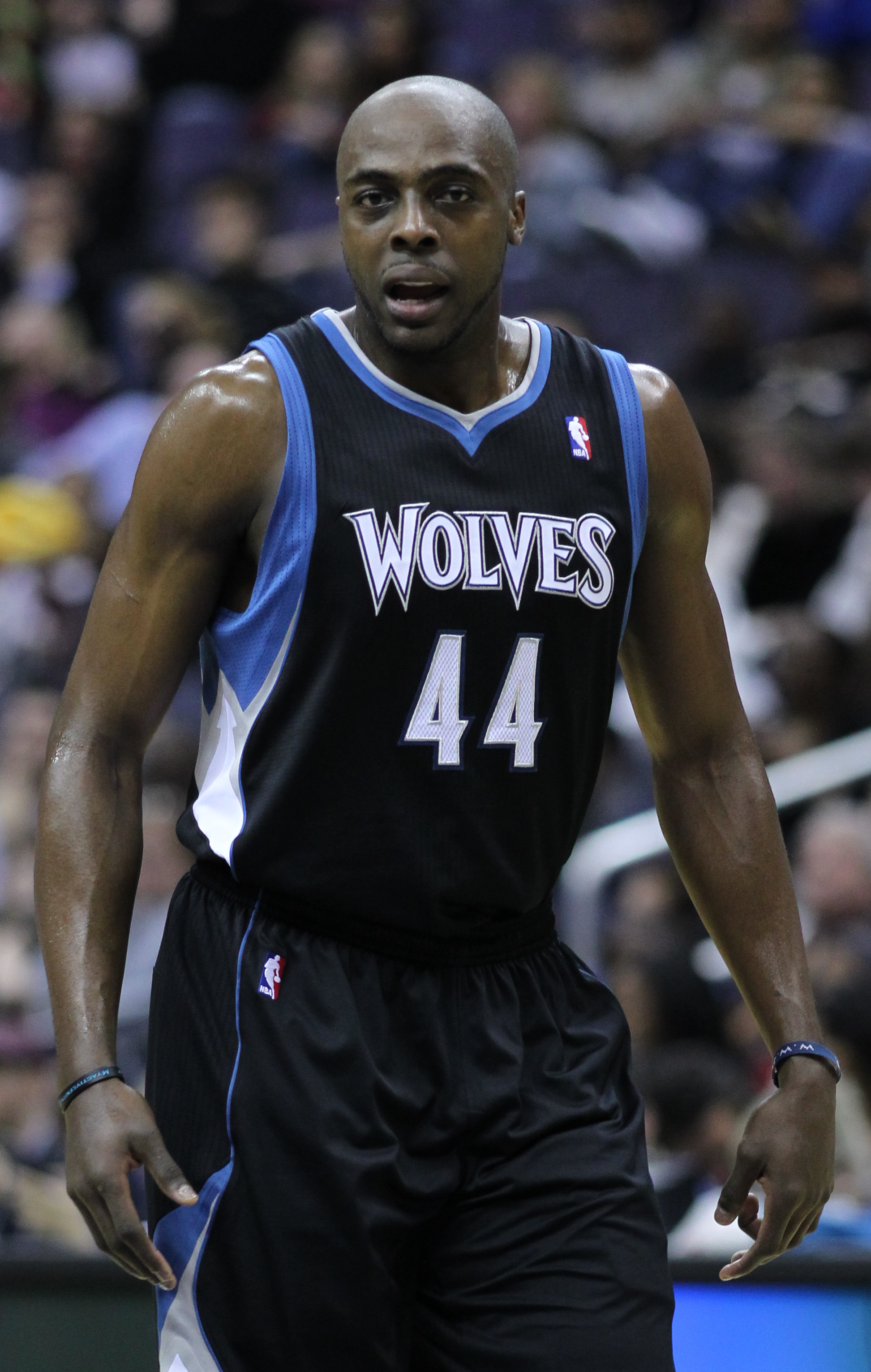
Anthony Tolliver

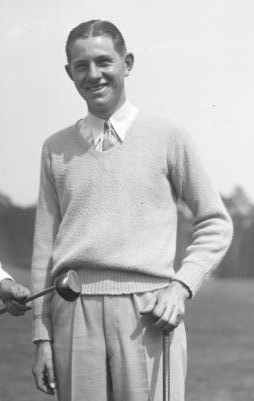
Horton Smith

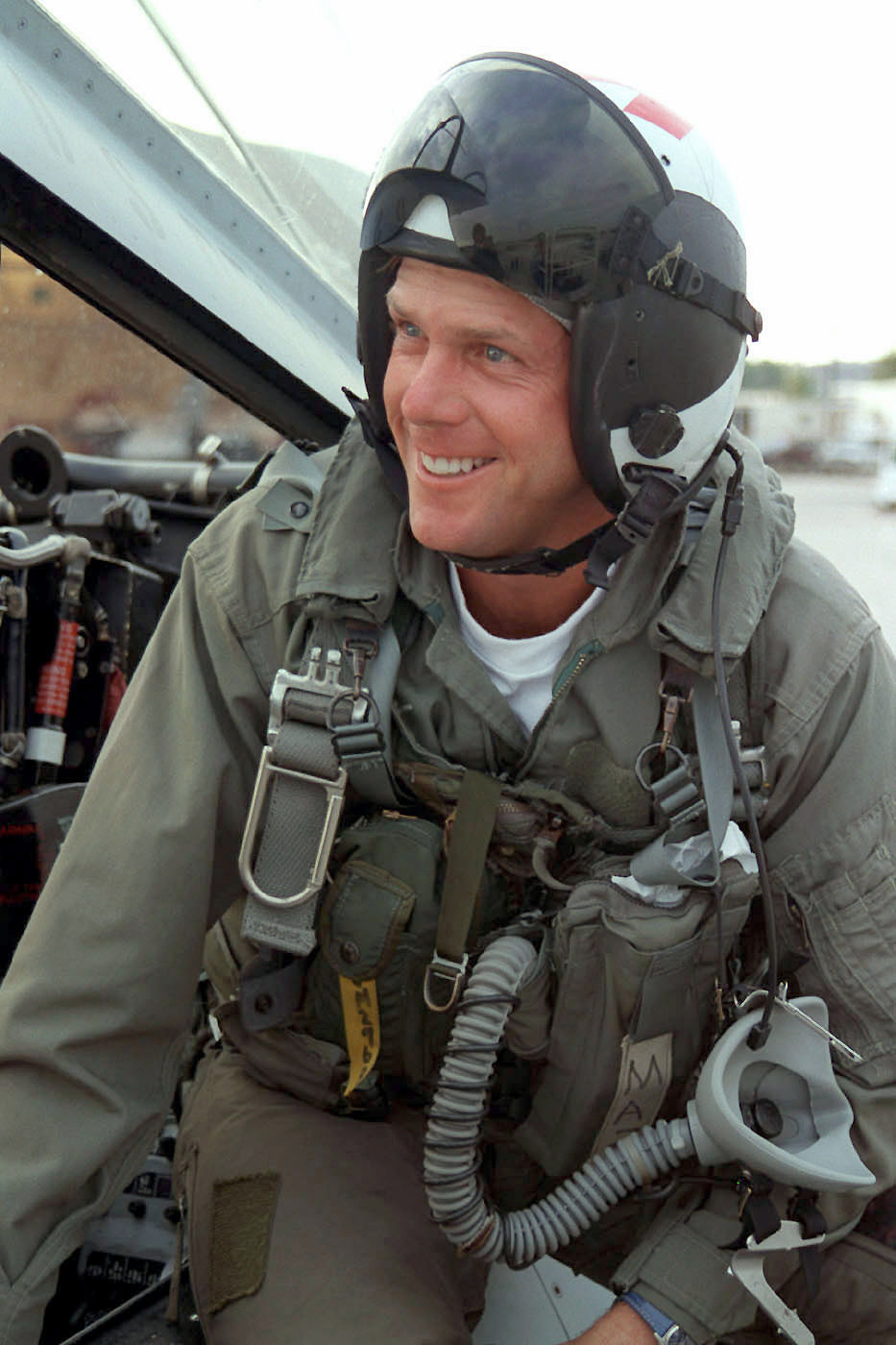
Payne Stewart

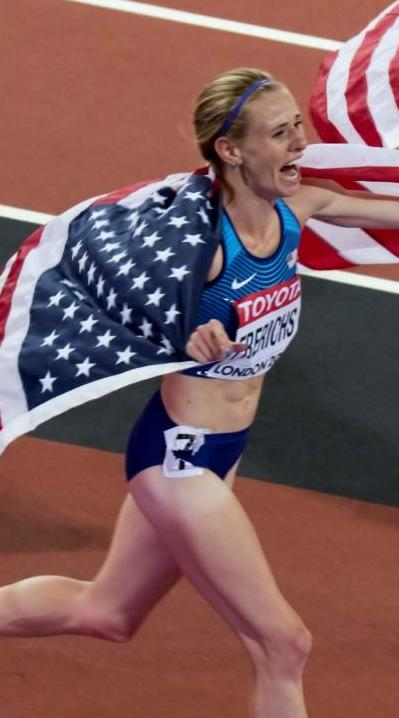
Courtney Frerichs

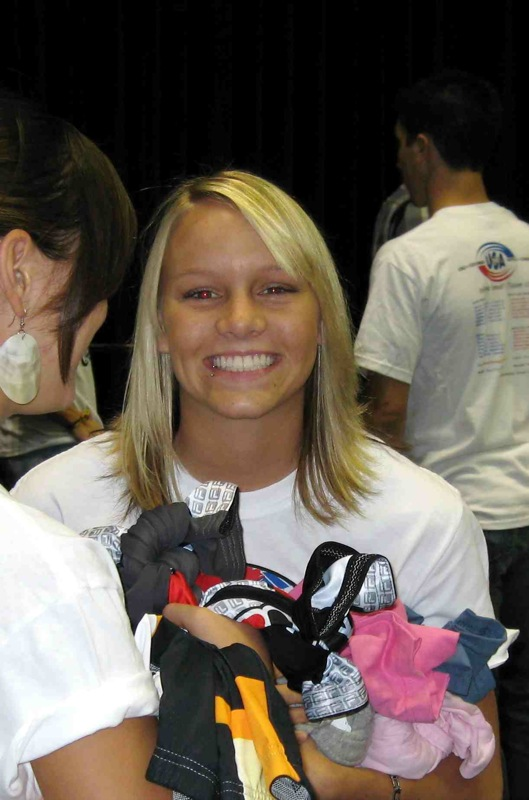
Emily Scott

== Other ==
- Jimmie Angel, aviator, discoverer of Angel Falls, highest free-falling waterfall in world
- William A. Beiderlinden, U.S. Army major general
- Oliver Brown, plaintiff in the Supreme Court case Brown v. Board of Education, born in Topeka
- Virginia E. Johnson, sexologist; junior member of Masters and Johnson sexuality research team
- Emma J. Ray, activist, suffragist
