= Winegardner and Hammons =

Winegardner and Hammons Hotel Group, LLC
- Type: Private
- Industry: Hospitality
- Founded: 1958
- Defunct: 2016
- Headquarters: Cincinnati, OH
- Key people: J. Erik Kamfjord - Chairman Emeritus; Mike Conway - CEO; Kent Bruggeman - CFO; Brien Perkins - COO; Terry Dammeyer - CCDO
- Website: www.whihotels.com(defunct)

Winegardner and Hammons was a full-service hotel management and development company established in 1961 Roy E. Winegardner and John Q. Hammons. It was one of the original franchisers of Holiday Inn. Winegardner and Hammons was acquired by Pyramid Hotel Group in 2016.

== Company history ==
In 1957, Winegardner bought his first Holiday Inn franchise in Lexington, Kentucky. Hammons joined Winegardner in 1958 and they created a private, independent hotel management company. They entered into an agreement with Holiday Inn to develop their hotels. The company incorporated in 1961, and during the 1960s, built nearly three dozen Holiday Inn hotels. In the following years, the company diversified, adding third-party management of hotels as well as other hotel brands. The most notable expansion added accounting and financial services for the hospitality industry. WHI emerges as one of the first franchises to be selected to grow the full service Marriott brand in 1994. In 1996, the company opened its first full-service Marriott hotel. It expanded into development of upscale, full-service, lifestyle, select service and conference center hotels.

== Awards ==
- 2003 John Hammons named "Corporate Hotelier of the World" sponsored by Hotels magazine
- 2004 Roy Winegardner and John Hammons inducted into the Hospitality Industry Hall of Honor
- 2005-2014 Gallup Great Workplace winner (Nine-time consecutive recipient)
- 2000-2014 Marriott International Partnership Circle Awards
- 2011-2014 Marriott International Service Excellence Award
- 2011-2014 Marriott International Food and Beverage Excellence Award
