= Positronic (company) =

American manufacturing company

- Type: Private
- Industry: Manufacturing
- Founded: Springfield, Missouri, United States (October 1966 as Positronic Industries)
- Founder: Jack Gentry
- Headquarters: 1325 N Eldon Ave, Springfield, Missouri, United States
- Area served: Worldwide
- Key people: Jay Sandidge(General Manager)
- Products: Electrical connectors
- Services: Design & Technical Support
- Number of employees: 733 Worldwide (2019); 462 in Missouri (2019)
- Website: www.connectpositronic.com

Positronic is a manufacturing company based in Springfield, Missouri. The company manufactures and supplies electronic connectors that are utilized in a variety of industries worldwide including military, aerospace, telecommunications, medical, industrial and test equipment among others.

The company is headquartered in Springfield, Missouri, and its main manufacturing plant is also located there. Positronic also has manufacturing plants in France and Singapore. Sales offices are located worldwide in major metropolitan areas.

== History ==
Positronic was founded by Jack Gentry, a former marines officer and a metallurgical engineer. Upon being discharged from the military, Gentry worked for Honeywell as a sales engineer.

On a flight from Los Angeles to New York City, Gentry met business manager and philanthropist Harry Gray. Four months later, Gray called Gentry and offered him a job with Litton Industries. During his stay at Litton Industries, Gentry established a plant of the company in Springfield, Missouri. However, feeling that he needed to explore other opportunities, he decided to create his own small company. By October 1966, he had founded Positronic Industries in Springfield, Missouri and initially, the company manufactured electronic components and connectors for the aerospace industry.

Eight years later, Positronic moved to Rogersville, Missouri, and in the following years, it progressed and managed three expansions. Tragically, the company's growth was shaken in February 1983, when a fire destroyed its new headquarters and manufacturing plant. Fearing that the company's competitors would take advantage of the situation, Gentry and his employees worked tirelessly to rebuild Positronic. They moved the company back to Springfield, Missouri, where Positronic's headquarters is still located today. And as the company gradually recovered from its losses, Positronic decided to venture overseas. Just months after the fire, the company expanded its operations into Europe. This expansion continued into Puerto Rico in 1991, Singapore in 1995, and India in 2004.

Beginning in 1993, Positronic began offering on-the-job training as a part of its apprenticeship program. The program is geared toward high school students seeking jobs in high-tech manufacturing, and it is offered to 17 and 18-year-olds as a school-to-work career opportunity. After graduation, successful apprentices are offered both employment with Positronic and funding for their college education for two years. Positronic also used the Ozarks Technical Community College training program for its own employee co-operative program.

In March 1995, employees of the main plant in Springfield were sent home after a chemical accident released a chlorine odor throughout the facility. A treatment plant operator caused the accident by improperly mixing chemicals in a waste treatment holding tank, creating pockets of chlorine gas. No one was harmed in the incident.

Despite the Asian financial crisis in the late 1990s, Positronic opened its 43,000 ft^{2} assembly plant in Mount Vernon, Missouri in 1999. Although the company had established a presence in Mount Vernon years before on July 5, 1988, the opening of the new facility was a part of Positronic's expansion into the Mount Vernon area. The facility houses the company's plastic molding department.

In 2002, less than a year after the September 11 attacks, then-US Senatorial candidate Jim Talent of Missouri visited Springfield. Talent put forward the message that the US government had to increase its military spending, especially in regard to building a strong missile defense system. On his tour of Positronic's facility on North Eldon Avenue, Talent stated that increasing the government's defense spending would produce more jobs for the American people. Positronic, a creator of domestic manufacturing jobs, produces electronic products that are being used in satellites, missiles, and other military equipment.

In 2011, Positronic moved eighty-one jobs from the two Springfield manufacturing plants to its Mount Vernon manufacturing plant. The shift was made in order to double the workforce of the Mount Vernon plant and to consolidate the company's two electrical connector assembly lines. With the increase in workforce, the company became one of the largest private employers in Mount Vernon.

In the same year, the company provided two $15,000 gift funds to Ozarks Technical Community College. The funds supported the expansion of the Information Commons West on the Springfield campus and financed the Middle College program. A new classroom in the Information Commons West was named in honor of Positronic.

In March 2013, Positronic launched its new online commerce website, PosiShop. PosiShop stocks and sells common Positronic connectors online.

In 2017, Positronic made investment in Singapore-based Plasmotech Pte Ltd.

In November 2018, Positronic released its Panther II connector series, which is a touch-safe cable-to-cable connector designed for rugged industrial application with industry standard safety features for fire, smoke and toxicity.

PEI-Genesis Launches D-subminiature Value-Added Assembly Program in 2019 with Positronic.

In June 2019, Positronic joined Open Compute Project as community member.

In February 2021, the company announced it had been acquired by Amphenol Corporation.

== Products ==
Positronic offers the following products:

- Power connectors
- Custom Connectors
- A variety of D-subminiature which includes accessories, adapters, standard and high density versions, dual ports, high performance versions, and more.
- A variety of circular and rectangular connectors
- Hermetic connectors
- A variety of connectors with thermocouple contact options

=== Recent product improvements ===
In August 2011, Positronic developed a new generation of backshell for D-subminiature connectors, which combines features that meet the needs the requirements for EMI/RFI protection for cable connectors.

In January 2013, the company has expanded the Scorpion series of power or signal connectors. The connectors come in an 8.20mm low-profile version and features a one-piece insulator and a modular tool design. Earlier in 2011, the product series was announced as being used for Advanced Telecommunications Computing Architecture's PICMG 3.8 standard.

== Awards and recognition ==
In 1993, Positronic received the ISO 9000 standard, becoming the first company in the Springfield area to receive the recognition. The company also received an ISO 9001 in 2007, and an AS9100 certification in 2009 for its North American operations.

Positronic was a recipient of the Gold Industrial Wastewater Pretreatment Compliance Award in 2000 and 2001. The award was given by The Missouri Water Environment Association Positronic was also a recipient of the 2008 Manufacturer of the Year Award from the Springfield Area Chamber of Commerce.

On February 10, 2004, Jack Gentry and Positronic were recognized in an honorary speech given by Roy Blunt of the United States House of Representatives. Blunt praised Gentry for his invaluable commitment to improving the US manufacturing sector and expanding the US manufacturing market abroad.

On January 11, 2011, the Positronic's Mount Vernon plant became a member of the Missouri Safety and Health Achievement Recognition Program. This designation is earned by companies who have achieved an excellent workplace safety record, virtually eliminating the occurrence of employee injuries while on the job.

Positronic was awarded Technology Manufacturer of the Year by MAM in November 2019 where its President was named Manufacturing Executive of the Year.
