= Jack Gentry (South African cricketer) =

South African cricketer (1907–??)

Personal information
- Born: 5 July 1907; Potchefstroom, South Africa
- Source: Cricinfo, 17 December 2020

Jack Gentry (born 5 July 1907, date of death unknown) was a South African cricketer. He played in six first-class matches in 1926/27 and 1927/28.
