= Jack Gentry (entrepreneur) =

American entrepreneur (1923–2006)

Jack T. Gentry
- Born: Jack T. Gentry; December 6, 1923; Kansas City, Kansas, United States
- Died: September 23, 2006 (aged 82); Springfield, Missouri, United States
- Education: Montana Tech of the University of Montana; University of Montana; Wyandotte High School
- Occupations: War veteran, metallurgical engineer, entrepreneur
- Known for: Positronic, Southwest Area Manufacturers Association
- Spouse: Thelma Ann KernAnn (m. 1946)
- Children: Dr. Kathleen Gentry; Suzan Gentry Sullivan; Jill Gentry Owen; John Gentry; Bill Gentry
- Parents: Rose Adlesh (deceased); Dewey Gentry (deceased)
- Relatives: Darlene Gentry Borris (sister)

Jack T. Gentry (December 6, 1923 – September 23, 2006) was an American soldier, engineer, and entrepreneur.. He was the founder and former president of Positronic, a manufacturing company based in Springfield, Missouri.

== Early life ==
Gentry was born on December 6, 1923, in Kansas City, Kansas, to Rose Adlesh and Dewey Gentry. Jack attended high school at Wyandotte High School. He attended Kansas City Junior College (now Metropolitan Community College in Missouri). A day after his 18th birthday, Pearl Harbor was attacked by the Imperial Japanese Navy; he then decided to enlist in United States Navy.

== Military career ==
=== World War II ===
Knowing that his future plans would be altered by the war, Gentry decided to enlist in the United States Navy. He volunteered to serve in the V-5 Naval Aviation Program in June 1942. He was trained as a civilian pilot for two months in Maryville, Missouri. After the two-month training period, he was ordered to attend boot camp training in Athens, Georgia. This lasted 16 weeks. After that, Gentry was transferred to Norman, Oklahoma, for three additional months of training. He completed his training in Corpus Christi, Texas, and began serving as a naval aviator with the United States Marine Corps. His first assignment was in Ft. Lauderdale, Florida, where he trained as a torpedo bombing pilot. He was then assigned to Goleta near Santa Barbara, California, joining a squadron of torpedo bombers in preparation for an overseas assignment. His final assignment was in the South Pacific and he was eventually released from active duty in January 1945 as a first lieutenant.

=== Korean War ===
Gentry was recalled by the military when the Korean War broke out in 1950. He was stationed in Kaneohe Marine Base, Oahu, Hawaii, where he served as an adjutant and a personnel officer. With his participation in the Korean War, Gentry was then promoted to the military rank of Captain.

== Career ==
After being released from active duty, he then decided to go back to college. Initially, he wanted to go back to Kansas City Jr. College. But a friend and naval pilot from Montana convinced him to enroll at the University of Montana. He decided to attend in the School of Forestry at the University of Montana. While at the University of Montana, he met Thelma Ann Kern, who was in her last semester. Gentry and Kern married on July 28, 1946, in Havre, Montana. After his marriage, he decided to change course and transfer to the Montana School of Mines. He graduated in 1950, finishing a degree in Metallurgical Engineering. After his graduation, he worked as a Production Metallurgist for American Smelting and Refining Company in Garfield County, Utah. Gentry was recalled from military service when the Korean War broke out.

After the Korean War, Gentry worked for Minneapolis Honeywell in Phoenix, Arizona. On a flight from Los Angeles to New York City, Gentry met business manager and philanthropist Harry Gray. Four months later, Gray called Gentry and offered him a job with Litton Industries in Van Nuys, California. Within three years, Gentry was promoted to general manager and then Executive Vice President. He took responsibility over three units of Litton Industries, namely the United States Engineering Company, Winchester Electronics, and Advanced Circuitry Division. He also pioneered Litton's effort to establish a plant in Springfield, Missouri.

Feeling that he needed to explore other opportunities, he decided to leave Litton Industries and create his own company. By October 1966, he had founded Positronic, in Springfield, Missouri and initially, the company manufactured electronic components and connectors for the aerospace industry.

Eight years later, Positronic moved to Rogersville, Missouri, and in the following years, it progressed and managed three expansions. Tragically, the company's growth was shaken in February 1983, when a fire destroyed its new headquarters and manufacturing plant. Fearing that the company's competitors would take advantage of the situation, Gentry and his employees worked tirelessly to rebuild Positronic. They moved the company back to Springfield, Missouri, the current headquarters of the company. Gentry's company recovered from the incident and later expanded overseas.

Gentry also served as a director of UMB Financial Corporation, and a board trustee member of Drury University. He also founded the Southwest Area Manufacturers Association in 1995, where he also served as president, former committee chairman of Electronic Industries Association, and a former secretary of International Electrotechnical Commission. He was also appointed by President Ronald Reagan as a member of the Industry Sector Advisory Committee V.

== Death and legacy ==
Gentry died on September 23, 2006, aged 82, at his home in Springfield, Missouri.

On February 10, 2004, Gentry and Positronic were recognized in an honorary speech given by Roy Blunt of the United States House of Representatives. Blunt praised Gentry for his invaluable commitment to improving the US manufacturing sector and expanding the US manufacturing market abroad. Gentry was also a recipient of numerous commendations for his military service. A "Jack Gentry Day" was proclaimed in Springfield in honor of him.
