= William Pleasant Jr. =

American artist and civil rights activist

William Meriette Pleasant Jr.
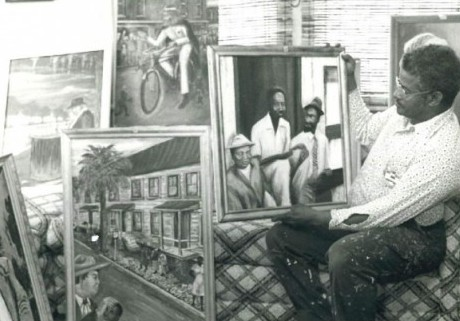
- Born: June 23, 1928; Savannah, Georgia, U.S.
- Died: 1997 (aged 68–69)
- Known for: Painting, Civil-rights activism
- Children: Jalal Pleasant

William Pleasant Jr. (June 23, 1928 – 1997) was an American expressionist painter and civil-rights activist. Several of his still-life paintings are held by the Smithsonian Institution in Washington, D.C., where they are displayed at its National Museum of African American History and Culture.

== Background ==
Born in Savannah, Georgia on June 23, 1928, to a well-to-do family, whose members include Louis Pleasant, co-founder of the Savannah Tribune (known then as the Savannah Colored Tribune) and former director of the Savannah Ports Authority. As a child, Pleasant was featured on national radio as part of the Major Bowles Amateur Hour. However, despite his and his family's social contributions, their status was nevertheless mitigated by the climate of racial attitudes in the Jim Crow South.

In his paintings, Pleasant sought to memorialize the local character of African-American life in Savannah amid the turmoil of the Civil Rights Movement. Pleasant himself had early on become active in the movement, frequently working in collaboration with friend and fellow civil-rights leader W. W. Law. His concern for Savannah's cultural and historical legacy lead to his 1971 publication of the first Black History coloring book. He served as a member of the Savannah NAACP and a Corporal in the United States Army. Pleasant continued to work in the entertainment industry until his death in 1997, primarily as television voice-over actor.
