= Vivian E. J. Cook =

American educator and activist

- Born: Vivian Elma Johnson; October 6, 1889; Collierville, Tennessee
- Died: July 28, 1977 (aged 87); Baltimore, Maryland
- Education: Howard University, Columbia University
- Occupation: Educator
- Spouse: Ralph Victor Cook

Vivian E. J. Cook (1889-1977) was an American educator and activist. She was the first African American woman in Baltimore to hold an administrative position at a secondary school.

== Biography ==
Cook née Johnson was born in Collierville, Tennessee on October 6, 1889. Her parents, Caroline Alley and Spencer Johnson, were both born into slavery. Caroline Alley became the first African American school teacher in Fayette County, Tennessee and her four daughters, including Vivian received college educations.

Cook graduated from Howard University in 1912. She began her teaching career at the Tuskegee Institute. She then moved to Cincinnati, Ohio and from there moved to St. Louis, Missouri where she taught at Sumner High School. She received her master's degree from Columbia University in 1917. In 1918 she married Ralph Victor Cook and the couple moved to Baltimore, Maryland.

In Baltimore, Cook worked as a teacher, vice-principal, and principal at several schools in the city including Frederick Douglass High School, Booker T. Washington High School, Dunbar Junior-Senior High School, Harvey Johnson Junior High School and Morgan State College. Cook was the first African American woman in Baltimore to hold an administrative position at a secondary school.

Cook was active in social and advocacy groups in Baltimore including the Epsilon Omega Chapter of Alpha Kappa Alpha, the Baltimore chapter of the National Association of College Women, and the Philomathean Club. In 1938 Cook was on the African-American subcommittee of the Baltimore Museum of Art's (BMA) Committee of the City where she advocated for an educational component to the 1939 exhibition Contemporary Negro Art. She also collaborated with curator Adelyn Breeskin on BMA projects highlighting African-American art. Cook worked with the Women’s Cooperative Civic League to arrange BMA's 1941 acquisition of a Dox Thrash watercolor, and the 1946 acquisition of a Jacob Lawrence watercolor.

Cook died on July 28, 1977 in Baltimore. Her papers are archived at Howard University.
