= Emma J. Ray =

American activist

- Born: January 7, 1859; Springfield, Missouri, US
- Died: November 25, 1930 (aged 71)
- Occupations: activist, evangelist, and suffragist
- Organization: Women's Christian Temperance Union (WCTU)
- Notable work: Twice Sold, Twice Ransomed

Emma J. Ray (January 7, 1859 – November 25, 1930) was an African-American activist, evangelist, and suffragist. She was also known as Emma J. Smith, Emma Smith, Emma J. Smith Ray, Emma Ray, and Mrs. L.P. Ray.

== Early life ==
Emma J. Ray was born Emma J. Smith in Springfield, Missouri, on January 7, 1859. She was born into enslavement, as both of her parents (mother Jennie Boyd and father John Smith) were enslaved. She had eight siblings.

Emma was a small child during the American Civil War. At the age of four, she and her mother traveled with their enslavers, fleeing south away from Union soldiers to prevent their freedom, to a wilderness camp in Bethpage, Missouri where Jennie gave birth to Emma's younger sisters, Priscilla Bethpage. Union soldiers made their way to Arkansas, where Emma and her mother were staying with their enslavers, where they remained with Union supporters until the civil war ended in 1865. [8].

After the Emancipation Proclamation, Emma and her mother were reunited with the rest of their family, and her father, John Smith, rented an acre of land and built them a home. They lived in what was referred to as “Dink-town”, which was a shantytown where recently emancipated people built homes from whatever scrap materials were available.

Emma's mother died in 1868, when Emma was just 9 years old. Her father continued to work as a farmer, and to help the family financially, she and her siblings also worked. Emma left school after fourth grade and gained employment as a domestic worker and nanny for the Timmons family, a white family.

== Marriage ==
Emma met Lloyd P. Ray in 1881. They were married in 1887 in Fredonia, Kansas. Shortly after their marriage, her husband struggled with alcohol issues, which put a strain on their relationship. They moved to Seattle, Washington on July 6, 1889, just a few months after the Great Seattle Fire, where her husband became employed as a stonemason to help rebuild and expand the city. It was in that same year that Emma Ray and her husband attended and converted in the Jones Street African Methodist Episcopal church (AME), in which her husband began abstaining from alcohol. After their conversion, they both experienced sanctification, leading them to evangelical work. They would continue this work into their later years.

== Activism and evangelism ==
Ray was dedicated to social and racial justice, which included work in the suffrage movement. In 1881, she began her work in the suffrage movement, working in campaigns, emphasizing the importance of the woman's vote. She did this work, organizing members for the movement, for 30 years.

Ray had joined the AME in 1889, shortly after she and her husband moved to Seattle. It was through the AME that she participated in evangelical work, which also tied into her social and racial justice work. During the Progressive Era, in 1891, Ray co-founded the Frances Ellen Harper (also known as Frances Harper) chapter and African-American chapter of the Women's Christian Temperance Union (WCTU) along with 15 other African-American women, and was elected and served as president. The chapter was named after Frances Harper, who was an African-American writer, abolitionist, and activist who organized African-American chapters of the WCTU on a national level. Emma and her fellow WCTU peers aided people who were sick, poor, homeless, sex workers, struggling with alcoholism, and/or incarcerated in the Yesler-Jackson area of Seattle. They cleaned for them, held prayer and religious services, and promoted abstinence against alcohol. Despite being highly regarded by leadership in the Western Washington WCTU, the Frances Harper chapter disbanded in 1895 due to a difference in vision by their AME pastor, Reverend J. Allen Viney, who ultimately withdrew their financial support. He wanted their focus to be on fundraising activities for the church because it was experiencing debt, while the women of the Frances Harper WCTU wanted to use church funds to focus on outreach work, serving those directly in need.

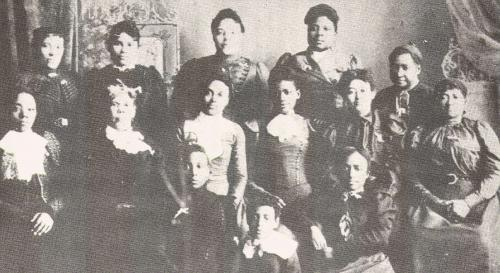
Emma J. Ray, center row, fourth person from the left. Co-founder and president of the Frances Harper Women's Christian Temperance Union (WCTU)

After the Frances Harper chapter of the WCTU disbanded, Emma wanted to continue her volunteer work for those in need. She joined the previously all-white WCTU in Seattle so she could continue her work in the Yesler-Jackson area and could participate in local and regional meetings. Shortly after, she was elected their County Superintendent of Jail and Prison Work. In the several years following, she and her husband would visit jails and sing hymns and offer ministry services. They would also clothe, house, and feed people who had been released from incarceration, giving them time to earn enough of a living to move out and live independently.

After joining the previously all-white chapter of the WCTU, she collaborated with Olive "Ollie" Spore Ryther, referred to as Mother Ryther, who ran a local orphanage. Together they would travel to waterfronts and brothels, offering religious services to those in the sex work industry and for people with addictions. They would house orphans and help to slowly wean people off of their addictions by reducing their intake over time. Her evangelical work served predominantly white populations, as, at the time, a majority of the population in this area was white.

In 1899, Emma and other peers re-established the Frances Harper chapter of the WCTU, after receiving encouragement from Lucy Thurman and other prominent African-American women leaders at a national WCTU convention, and after receiving support from the church's new pastor.

Emma Ray and her husband, Lloyd P. Ray, returned to Kansas City, Missouri from 1900–1902 to visit with family and to do mission work. They built a rescue mission in an impoverished neighborhood known as Hick's Hollow. They resided in the Hick's Hollow neighborhood to better serve their community, and at the rescue mission they ran programs for African-American children living in poverty. They offered programs in housing, food, clothing, local trips to the park, and education which took place in Sunday schools. Emma's work in the African-American community during this time paralleled Mary Church Terrell's speech and promotion of racial uplift, yet differed in that Emma lived and worked alongside and served those in need. While there was no organization for black women of the WCTU in Kansas City at that time, Emma Ray was able to gather support in her mission from the WCTU's white chapter.

The Rays moved back to Seattle in 1902, where Lloyd built their home off of Sunnyside Avenue, the home in which they would reside for the rest of their lives. They took up missionary work at the Olive Branch Mission in Pioneer Square and joined The Pine Street Free Methodists. They shifted from the AME to the Free Methodist church because the Free Methodist church had accepted their experiences with sanctification, while the AME did not. Emma also felt supported when she developed temporary neuralgia in her face. Members of the Free Methodist Church offered her prayers and medicine to help her heal. After becoming licensed Conference Evangelists, Emma and her husband would hold revivals and preach across the state of Washington.

== Late life ==
From 1905 to 1920, Emma continued her mission work. While she stopped missionary work in her 60s, she continued her spiritual work with The Free Methodists until her death in 1930.

== Autobiography ==
Emma J. Ray wrote her autobiography, Twice Sold, Twice Ransomed, which The Free Methodist Publishing House published in 1926.
