= Harry Gray (business executive) =

American business manager and philanthropist

Harry Jack Gray (November 18, 1919 – July 8, 2009) was an American business manager and philanthropist, best known as CEO and chairman of United Technologies. He was born Harry Jack Grusin in Milledgeville Crossroads, Georgia. His mother, Bertha Grusin, died of cancer when he was six years old. He went to live with his older sister, Gussie, in Chicago, Illinois. His father's business failed when he was eight, and he financed his college education at the University of Illinois with multiple jobs that included washing dishes, waiting tables, and stoking a boarding-house furnace.

He graduated with a journalism degree in 1941, and immediately joined the U.S. Army. His service included a year in the U.S. and three and a half years overseas during World War II. He received the Silver Star for valor in the Battle of the Bulge, and was discharged as a captain. Gray resumed his studies at U of I, completing a master's degree, with high honors, in 1947. He changed his last name to Gray in 1951. He worked in advertising and sales until joining Consolidated Electro Dynamics in 1954. That company grew in annual sales from $1 million to $20 billion and changed its name to Litton Industries by the time he left its employ in 1971.

He left Litton to become president, chief administrative officer, and a member of the board of directors, of United Aircraft. He was named chief executive officer the next year, then also was chairman of UA and its successor United Technologies Corporation starting in 1974.

In 1984 Oglethorpe University honored him with the title of Doctor of Engineering in 1984.

Shortly before his retirement from UTC in 1986, he also became the second recipient of an honorary doctorate from Central Connecticut State University.

He then was chairman and CEO of Harry Gray Associates, which participated with Shawmut National Venture in the 1993 buyout of Mott Metallurgical Corporation. In retirement, he and his wife Helen contributed to organizations such as Hartford Hospital, University of Hartford, University of Connecticut, University of Illinois, Mark Twain House in Hartford and other organizations. He is also listed as the largest private donor to the construction of the National Infantry Museum in Columbus, Georgia. Bronze busts of Gray and his wife are on display in the museum, which also houses his helmet and other memorabilia, including his Silver Star awarded for valor during the Battle of the Bulge.

As of 2003, Gray was also chairman of the boards of both Mott Corporation and SourceOne. Gray was inducted into the Junior Achievement U.S. Business Hall of Fame in 2003. Gray also was on the Board of Trustees at Sea Research Foundation (parent company of Mystic Aquarium) from 1997 until his death.

Harry Gray died on Wednesday, July 8, 2009 at the age of 89 at Hartford Hospital (in the city that is both Connecticut's capital city and UTC's headquarters' location). According to Stephen Miller's remembrance article published in the Wall Street Journal two days later, he was "a merger artist who resented making just one deal at a time." Gray was both admired and feared as "The Grand Acquisitor". In the mid-1970s, his prime deal-making days as CEO and chairman of United Technologies Corp., Gray had maintained a list of the 50 companies he sought to acquire.

Gray was always preoccupied with holding more companies. But he was equally intent on controlling what he had. Passing the torch at the mandatory retirement age of 65 was something he could not abide. "In this system, we don't need a No. 2 man," he once told Business Week.

Business positions
Preceded by William P. Gwinn	CEO of United Aircraft Corporation; October 1, 1972 – May 1, 1975	Name change
New title	CEO of United Technologies Corporation; May 1, 1975 – December 31, 1986	Succeeded by Robert F. Daniell
