= Black women in American politics =

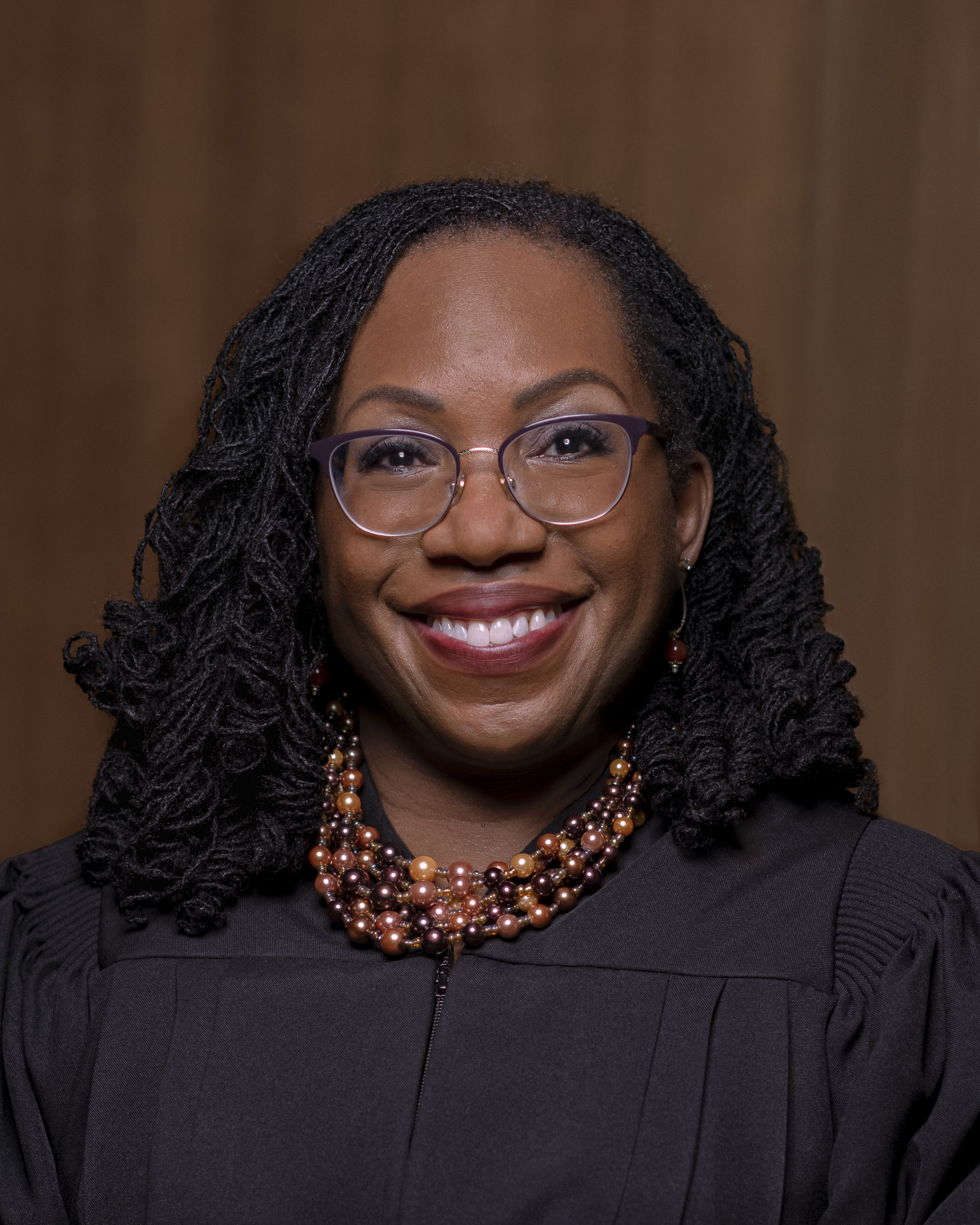
Left to right:
Associate Justice Ketanji Brown Jackson (2022–present), 49th Vice President of the United States Kamala Harris (2021–2025)

Black women have been involved in American socio-political issues and advocating for the community since the American Civil War era through organizations, clubs, community-based social services, and advocacy. Black women are currently underrepresented in the United States in both elected offices and in policy made by elected officials. Although data shows that women do not run for office in large numbers when compared to men, Black women have been involved in issues concerning identity, human rights, child welfare, and misogynoir within the political dialogue for decades.

Black women almost uniformly vote for the Democratic Party, usually at least 90% or higher. In the 2024 United States presidential election, Black women voted for Kamala Harris by a margin of 92-7%.

== History ==
=== Black women's suffrage, voting rights and racism ===
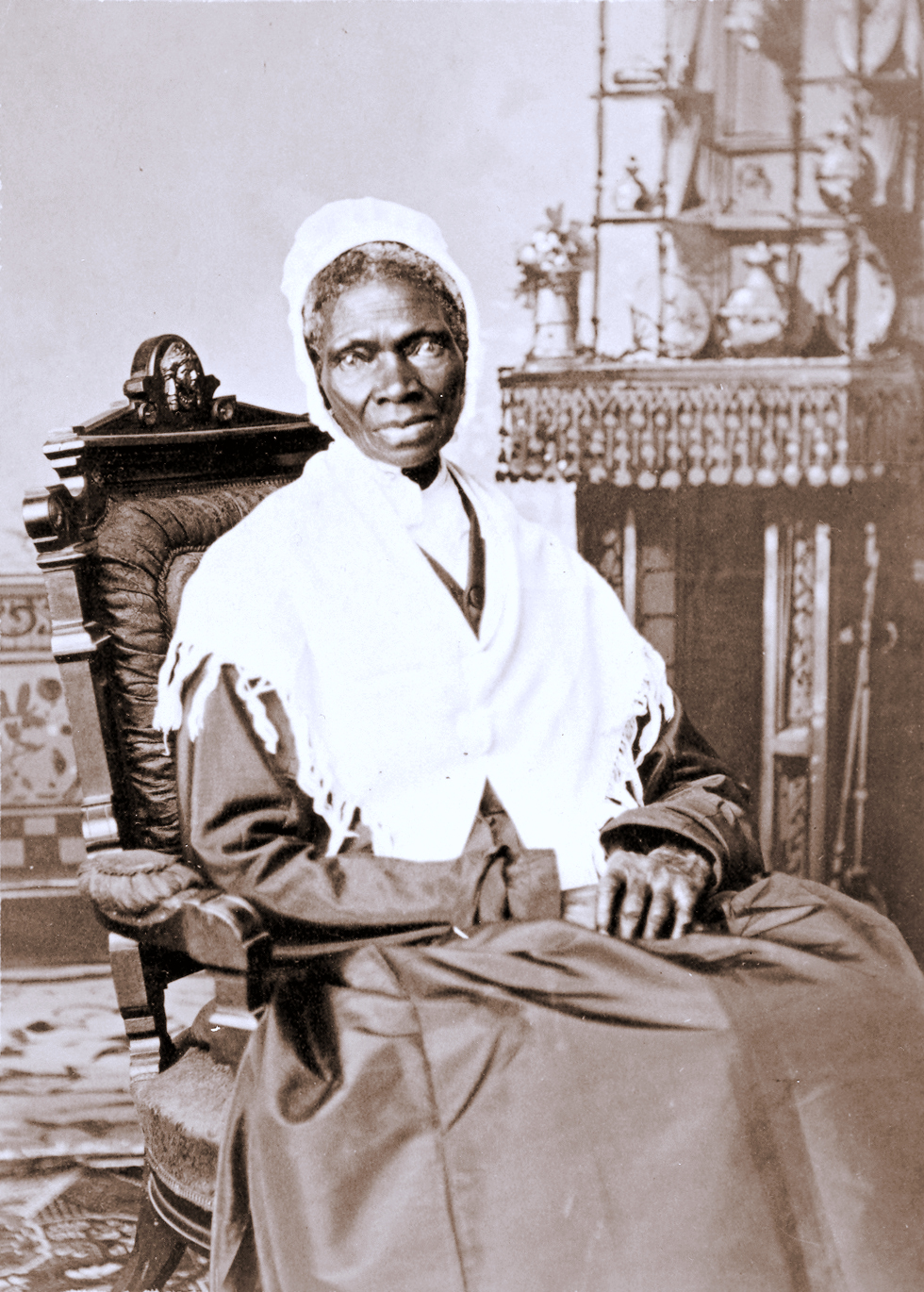
Sojourner Truth (c. 1870)

The U.S. Women’s Rights Movement involved many Black women suffragists who were simultaneously fighting for the abolition of slavery and women's rights. Formerly enslaved and free Black women like Mary Church Terrell, Frances Ellen Watkins Harper, Harriet Tubman, Mary Ann Shadd Cary, and Maria W. Stewart advocated for their rights by participating in women’s rights gatherings in the 1850s and 1860s. At the time, Black women felt sidelined by both Black men and white suffragists, who did not consider their struggle for voting rights to be an important issue. As a result of this exclusion, Black suffragists were forced to march separately from white suffragist marches, and both Elizabeth Cady Stanton and Susan B. Anthony largely ignored contributions of Black suffragists.

It was at the 1851 Ohio Women's Convention at Akron, that abolitionist and preacher Sojourner Truth gave the speech commonly referred to as 'Ain't I a Woman?' Truth was the only Black woman in attendance at the conference and delivered the speech from the steps of the Old Stone Church, on the second day of the convention. The most widely-circulated version of her speech, titled "Ain't I a Woman," and was transcribed by Frances Dana Barker Gage, a feminist writer and attendee of the convention. This version contained stereotypical speech of Southern Slaves, though Truth was from New York and Jersey Dutch was her first language, and other details that are suspected to be highly exaggerated. Both recent historians and the Sojourner Truth Project find a transcribed version by Marcus Robinson, an abolitionist and newspaper editor of the time, to be the most accurate version. In her speech, Truth demanded equal human rights for all women, not simply white women, as well as the intersection of abolitionism with women's rights. However, as the feminist movement progressed throughout the 20th century, intersectionality was not taken into consideration and the movement largely focused on the plight of white women. Black women would eventually come together to create Womanism. Named after a term coined by Alice Walker, Womanism is based on the history and everyday experiences of Black women.

Though women obtained the right to vote in the United States in 1920, many women of color still ran into obstacles. Some faced tests that required them to interpret the Constitution in order to vote. Others were threatened with physical violence, false charges, and other extreme danger to prevent voting. Due to these tactics and others that marginalized people of color, the Voting Rights Act of 1965 was enacted under President Johnson. It outlawed discriminatory acts to prevent people from voting.

=== Women and the Black Power movement ===
Although some elements of the Black Power movement included misogynistic views, women quickly found a voice in the movement. Black women held leadership positions, ran community-based programs, and fought misogyny. Others also contributed to the grassroots movement through community service. "In the age of rights, antipoverty, and power campaigns, Black women in community-based and often women-centered organizations, similar to their female counterparts in nationally known organizations, harnessed and engendered Black Power through their speech and iconography as participants of tenant councils, welfare rights groups, and a Black female religious order."

=== Women and the 2020 election ===
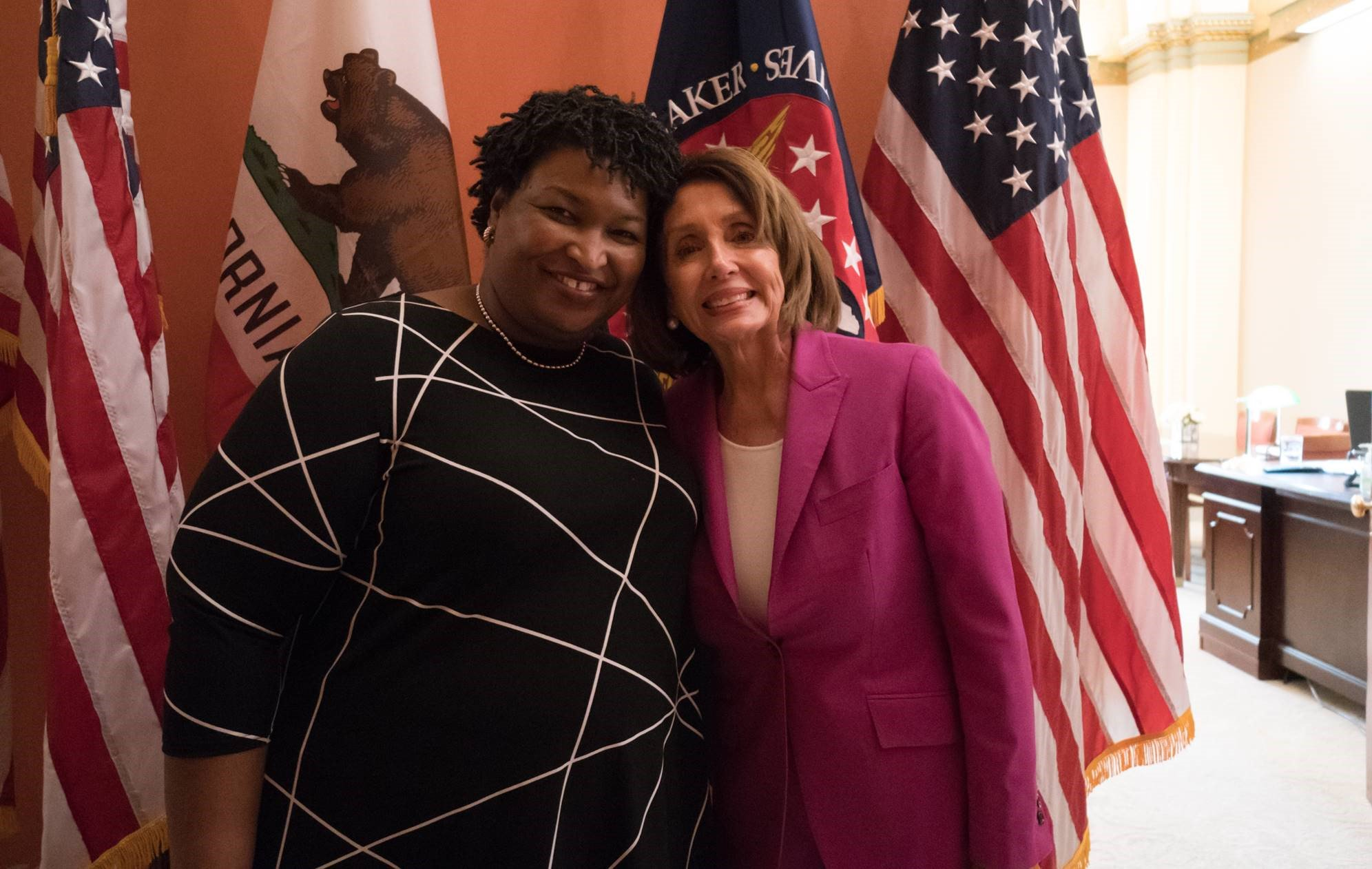
Stacey Abrams with Nancy Pelosi

One critical factor in Joe Biden's 2020 United States presidential election win was the efforts of Black women and other people of color who helped to energize and register voters across the United States. In 2020, more than two-thirds of Black women "turned out to vote in the presidential election" — "the third highest rate of any race-gender group."

==== Georgia ====
Stacey Abrams, former representative of Georgia (2007 to 2017) and minority leader (2011 to 2017), founded both Fair Fight Action and New Georgia Project, organizations focused on addressing voter suppression and voter registration, and is considered to be one of the key people to encourage voter outreach programs that affected the 2020 election in Georgia. Abrams and other prominent women of color such as LaTosha Brown of Black Voters Matter worked for several years registering voters and continued to register more than 800,000 new voters in the time leading up to the 2020 election. While Georgia went to Donald Trump during the 2016 election, fueled by a mostly white, Republican electorate, Abrams and her cohorts chose to focus on persuading voters of color that their votes did matter rather than focusing on undecided white voters. As a result of these efforts, more than one million Black voters cast ballots in the 2020 election. Largely because of Black voters, Georgia went blue for the first time in a presidential election since 1992, delivering the state to Joe Biden. Abrams was also the first Black woman to deliver a response to the State of the Union address.

== Political representation ==
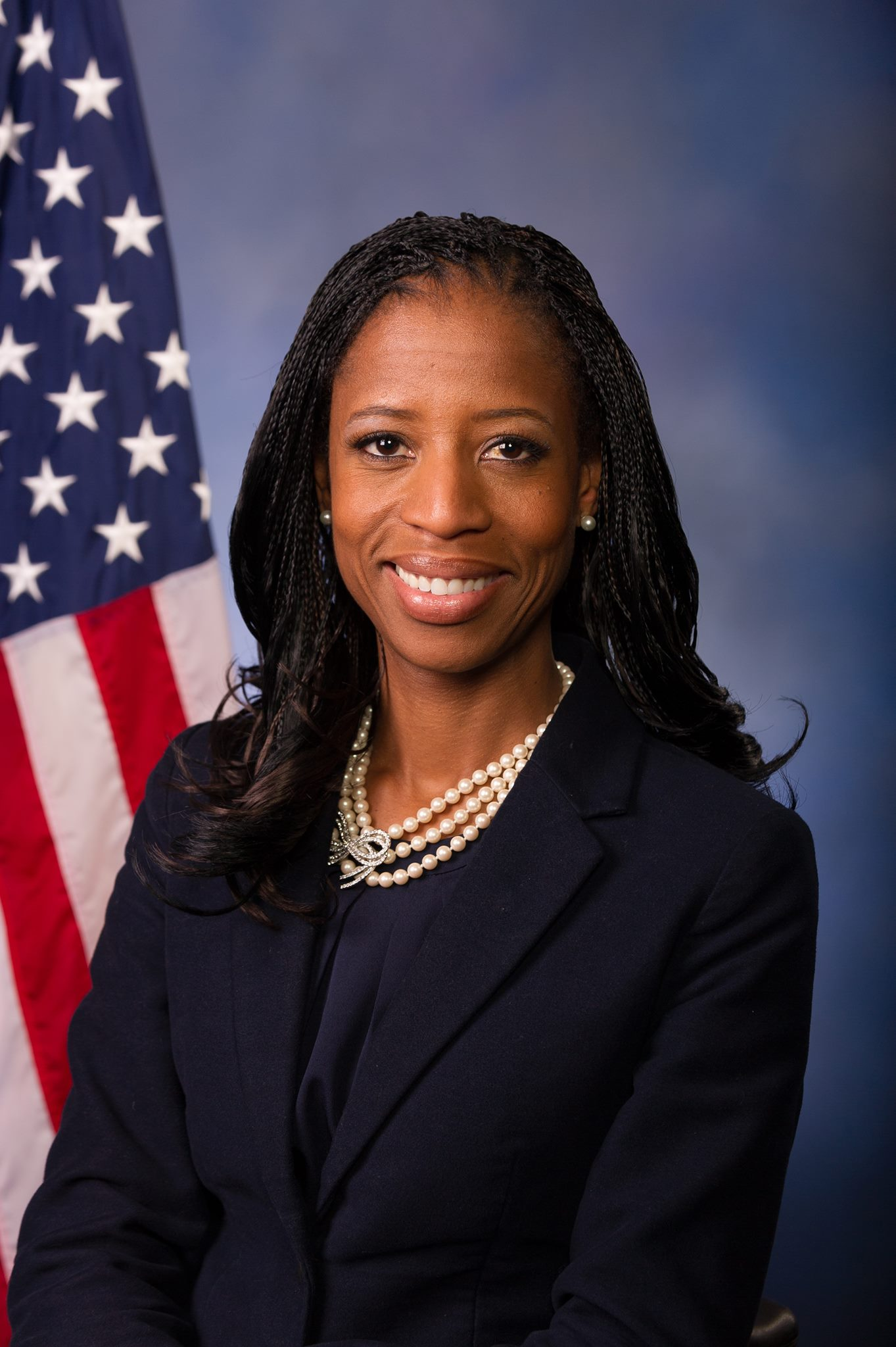
Mia Love, official photograph, 2015

Black women have been underrepresented in politics within the United States, but numbers continue to increase. In 2011, according to the Center for American Women and Politics at Rutgers University, 13 Black women served in the 112th Congress with 239 state legislators serving nationwide. In 2014, Mia Love was the first Black woman to be elected to Congress for the Republican Party. In 2021, as stated by the Center for American Women and Politics at Rutgers University, 27 Black women served in the 117th Congress, doubling the number of Black women to serve in 2011. The paths to public office for women in the Black community have differed from men and other groups, such as women's organizations, rallies, and fundraisers.

=== State, county and local government ===
In 2025, there were 2,483 women in state legislatures, 402 of whom were Black women. Of the over 20,000 elected county and local officials, fewer than 8% were Black women.

On April 3, 1973, Lelia Foley became the first Black woman elected mayor in the United States. In 1974, Oklahoma named Foley Outstanding Woman of the Year.

In 2008, Karen Bass (D-CA) became the first Black woman to serve as a house speaker in a state legislature, leading the California State Assembly.

Stephanie Summerow Dumas was elected in 2018 as the first Black woman county commissioner in the history of Ohio.

In 2019, Andrea Stewart-Cousins became the first Black woman to lead a state senate, becoming president pro tem of the New York State Senate. She later became the first Black woman to hold the position of lieutenant governor in New York.

In 2025, according to the Center for American Women and Politics at Rutgers University, 21 Black women work in state legislative leadership in 42 states. That year, Black women also led 8 of the largest 100 cities in the US as mayor.

=== United States House of Representatives ===
Overall, 19 states, including the U.S. Virgin Islands and the District of Columbia, have elected a Black woman to represent them in the U.S. House. There are currently 42 Black female representatives and three Black female delegates in the United States House of Representatives. Most are members of the Congressional Black Caucus. The first Black woman to serve as a representative was Shirley Chisholm from New York's 12th congressional district in 1969 during the Civil Rights Movement.

=== United States Senate ===
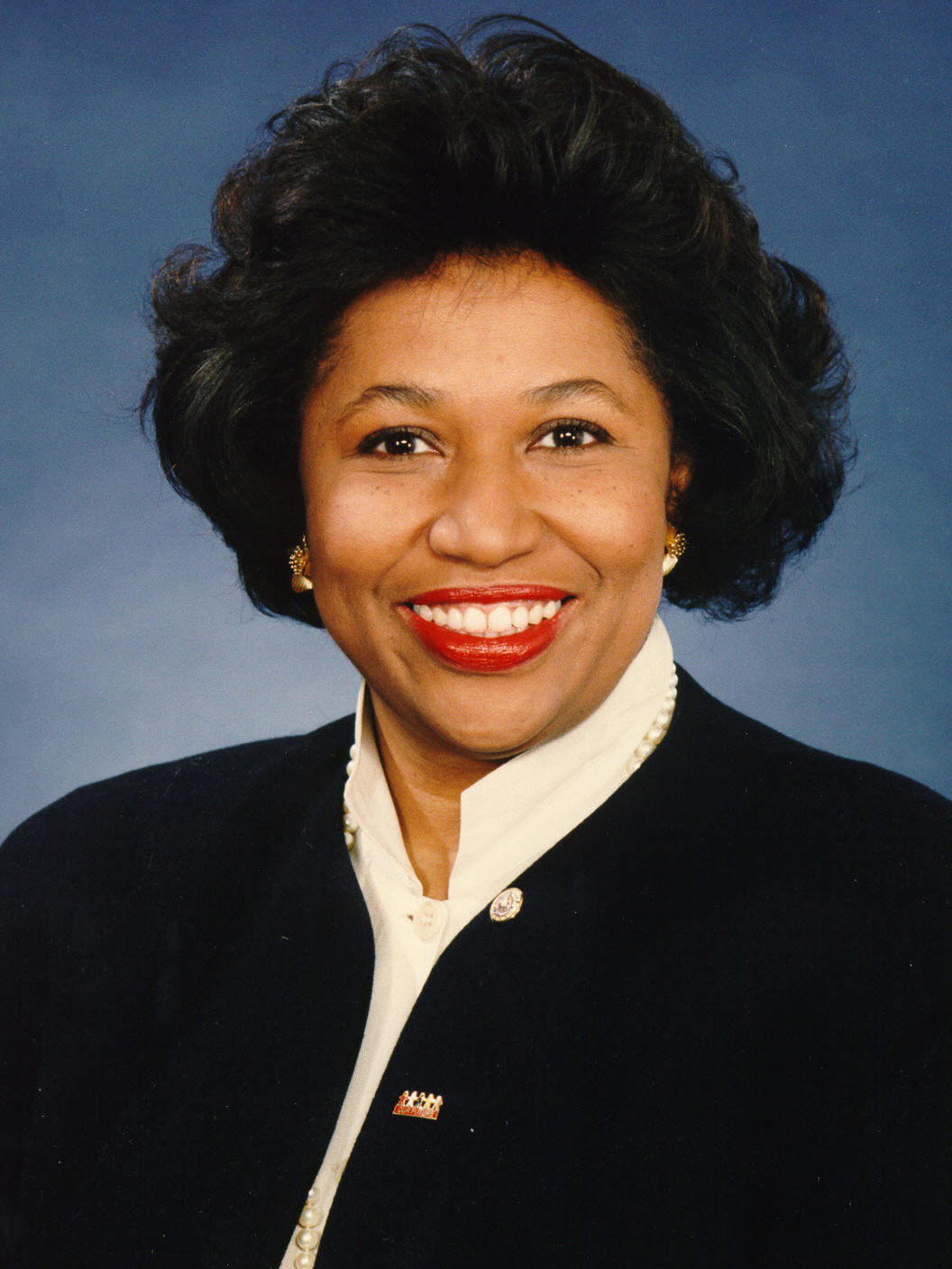
Carol Moseley Braun, the first African-American woman elected to the U.S. Senate, 1993

Kamala Harris was the first African-American U.S. senator to be elected vice president of the United States. Black women in the United States Senate are underrepresented twofold: the United States Senate has had fourteen Black elected or appointed office holders and only five Black female senators since its inception in 1789. For a complete list of office holders, see List of African-American United States senators. Despite this, Black women are increasingly running for and being elected or appointed to offices.

In 1993, Carol Moseley Braun became the first Black woman to be elected to the United States Senate, and the first female senator from Illinois. Braun served from 1993 to 1999, only one term. Braun's shock at Democratic incumbent senator Alan Dixon's vote to confirm Clarence Thomas after his 1991 sexual harassment scandal motivated her successful primary campaign against Dixon. Shortly after being elected, Braun took a one-woman stand against the United Daughters of the Confederacy's renewal of patent for the Confederate flag as their insignia. Though Braun considered it a non-issue, she was still puzzled: "Who would have expected a design patent for the Confederate flag?" Incredibly, Braun was able to sway the Senate vote against renewal of the patent. The United Daughters of the Confederacy no longer uses the confederate flag as their insignia.

In 2017 Kamala Harris began serving as the junior United States senator from California and was the second African American woman elected to the U.S. Senate in American history. In 2004, she was elected the 27th district attorney of San Francisco and served from 2004 to 2011. During that time, Harris created a unit to tackle environmental crimes and a Hate Crimes Unit that focused on hate crimes committed against LGBT youth in schools. In 2010, Harris won the election for California's attorney general by less than 1 point and about 50,000 votes. She was then re-elected in 2014 by a wide margin.

Harris has a strong record of bipartisan cooperation with her Republican colleagues, having introduced a multitude of bills with Republican co-sponsors, including a bail reform bill with Senator Rand Paul, an election security bill with Senator James Lankford, and a workplace harassment bill with Senator Lisa Murkowski. Senate Judiciary Chairman Lindsey Graham said of Harris: "She's hard-nosed. She's smart. She's tough." Harris resigned from serving the state of California as a U.S. senator on January 18, 2021, two days before she was inaugurated as vice president of the United States. She became the first female and first African-American vice president of the United States Senate. As of the 2022 midterm elections, there were no Black women in the United States Senate.

On October 1, 2023, labor union official Laphonza Butler was chosen to fill the Senate seat left vacant by Dianne Feinstein's death. Butler became the first openly LGBT member of the U.S. Senate from California and its first Black LGBT member, and was sworn in on October 3, 2023.

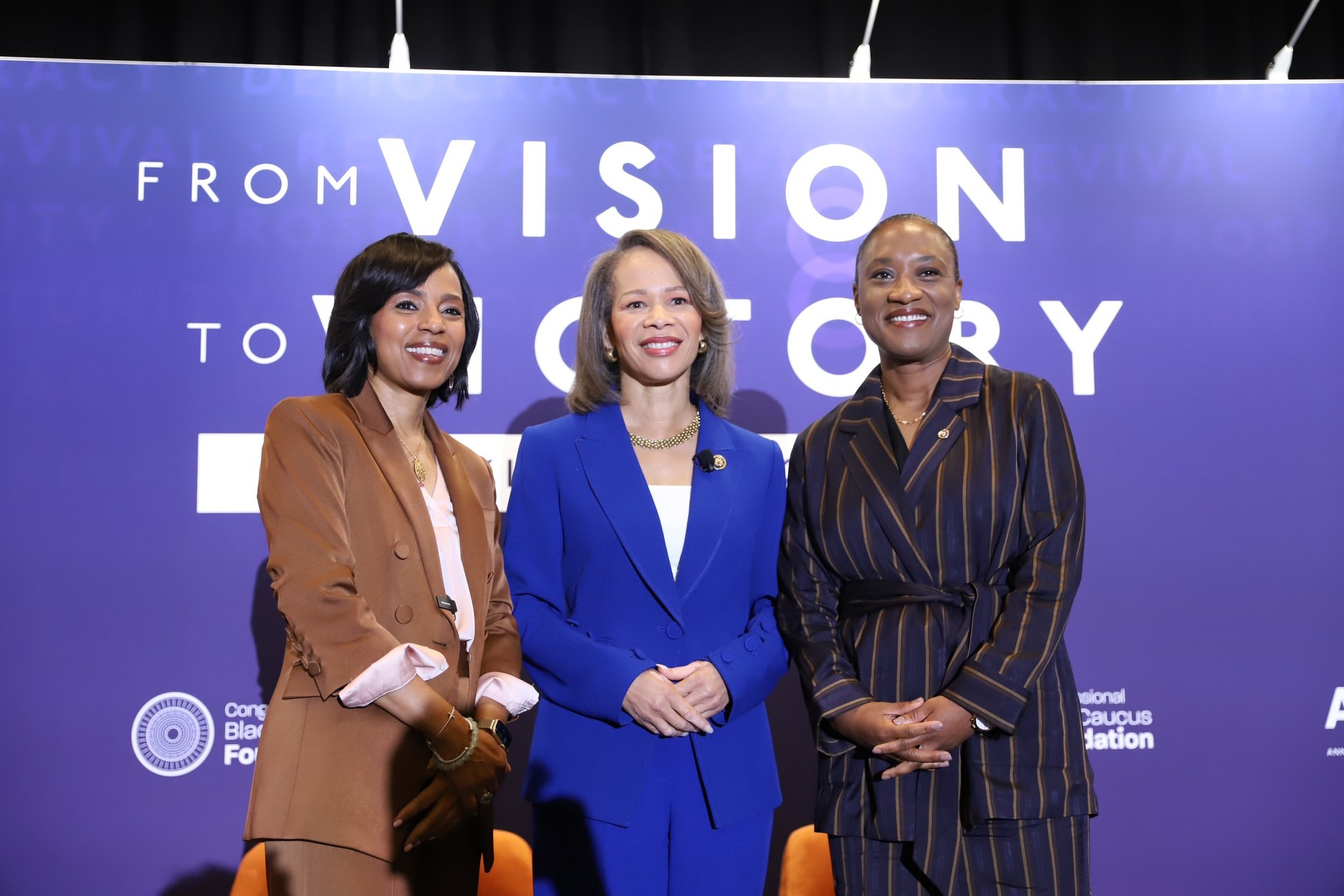
Angela Alsobrooks, Lisa Blunt Rochester and Laphonza Butler, 2024

In the 2024 election, Angela Alsobrooks was elected as a senator from Maryland, and Lisa Blunt Rochester was elected as a senator from Delaware. The two are the largest number of Black women serving at the chamber at the same time.

National press noted seven Black women running for US Senate in 2026 whose wins could make US political history by increasing their representation in the upper chamber of Congress: Jasmine Crockett of Texas, Robin Kelly or Juliana Stratton of Illinois, Pamela Stevenson of Kentucky, Priscilla Williams-Till of Mississippi, N’Kiyla “Jasmine” Thomas of Oklahoma and Catherine Fleming Bruce of South Carolina.

On March 17, 2026, Juliana Stratton won the Illinois Democratic nomination for United States Senate, potentially increasing the number of Black women in that body.

=== Cabinet, executive departments, and agencies ===
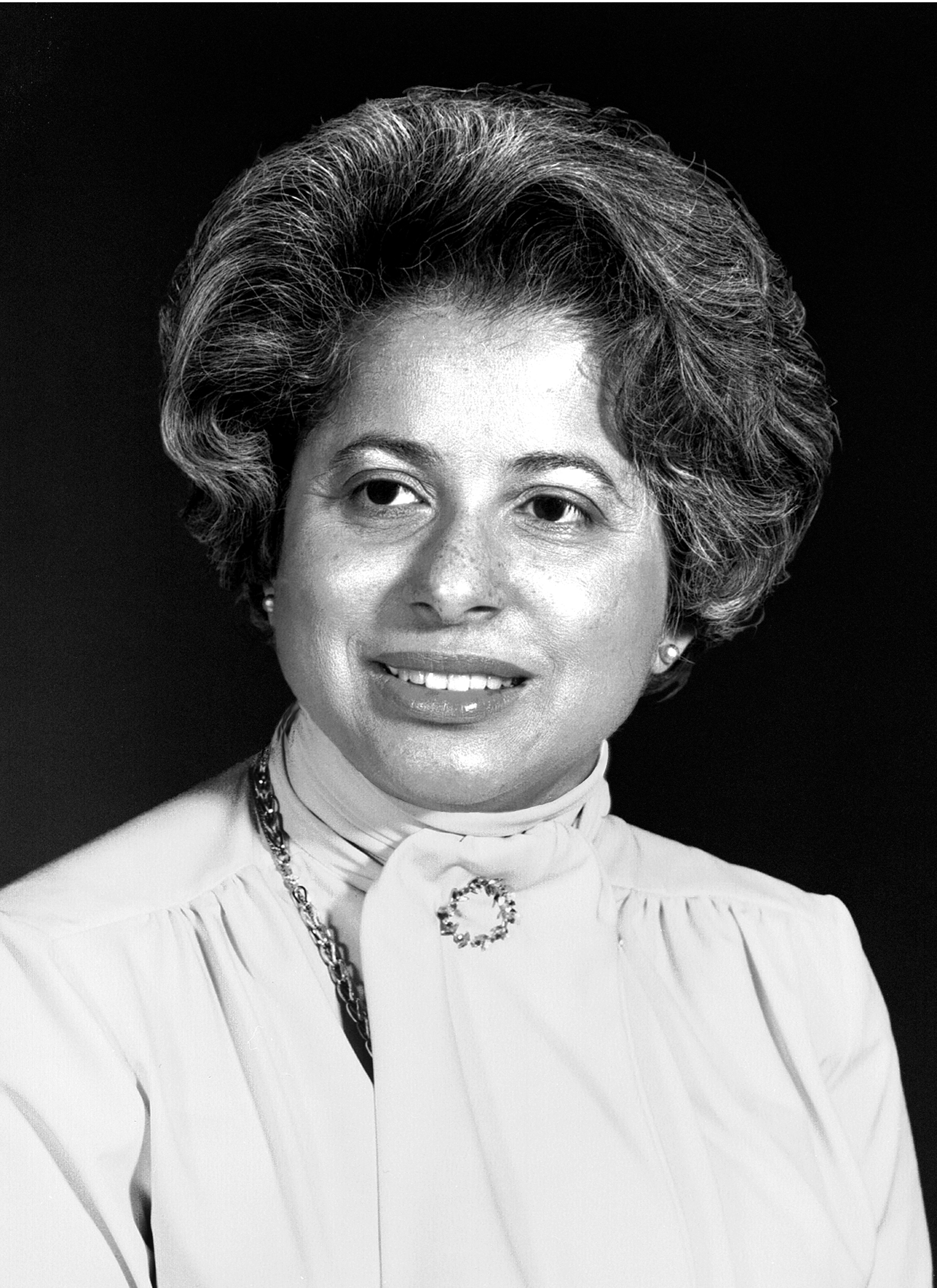
Patricia Roberts Harris was the first African American woman to serve in a presidential cabinet, as well as first to be United States ambassador.

The United States Cabinet has had six Black female officers. Patricia Roberts Harris was the first Black woman to serve in the cabinet; she was appointed secretary of housing and urban development in 1977 by President Jimmy Carter. Hazel R. O'Leary became the second Black woman to serve in the cabinet during the Clinton administration, as secretary of energy. Alexis Herman was the first Black woman to serve as the secretary of labor during the tenure of President Bill Clinton, after serving as the director of the Women's Bureau under President Jimmy Carter from 1977 to 1981. She was the youngest person to ever serve as the director of the Women's Bureau, at the age of 29 years old.

Condoleezza Rice was appointed secretary of state in 2005 under the Bush administration, and thus became the first Black woman to serve as secretary of state, as well as the first in history to be the highest-ranking woman in the United States presidential line of succession. Rice also became the first woman to serve as the National Security advisor.

Loretta Lynch served as the 83rd attorney general of the United States from 2015 to 2017 during the Obama administration. She succeeded Eric Holder, and had previously served as the U.S. attorney for the Eastern District of New York under both Presidents Bill Clinton and Barack Obama. On November 8, 2014, Obama nominated Lynch for the position of U.S. attorney general, to succeed Holder. Her nomination process was one of the longest in the history of the United States, taking 166 days. She was confirmed by the Senate Judiciary Committee on February 26, 2015, and approved by the Senate in a 56–43 vote, thereby becoming the first Black woman to hold this office. She was sworn in by Vice President Joe Biden on April 27, 2015.

Another Obama administration appointee, Susan Rice, served as a foreign policy aide to Michael Dukakis during the 1988 United States presidential election and in the Clinton administration in various capacities. Rice served as National Security advisor in the Obama administration from 2013 to 2017, and helped with U.S. efforts on the Iran nuclear deal of 2015 and the Paris Agreement on climate change. Rice's name was also floated as a potential vice-presidential running mate to Biden in 2020; however, Senator Kamala Harris was officially announced as Biden's running mate in August 2020. Rice was later appointed as director of the Domestic Policy Council under President Biden.

Democratic Congresswoman Marcia Fudge was selected by President Joe Biden to serve as secretary of Housing and Urban Development, the first Black woman to do so since Patricia Roberts Harris. Fudge initially lobbied for agriculture secretary, noting her legislative background in food and nutrition programs would make her a "natural fit." She also noted that prior Democratic administrations had relegated Black people to specific "urban" cabinet positions, saying that "we want to put the Black person in Labor or HUD." The agriculture secretary role ultimately went to Tom Vilsack, a white man who had served in the same role during the Obama administration.

As of December 2025, there are no Black women in the Trump Administration cabinet.

=== Vice presidents ===
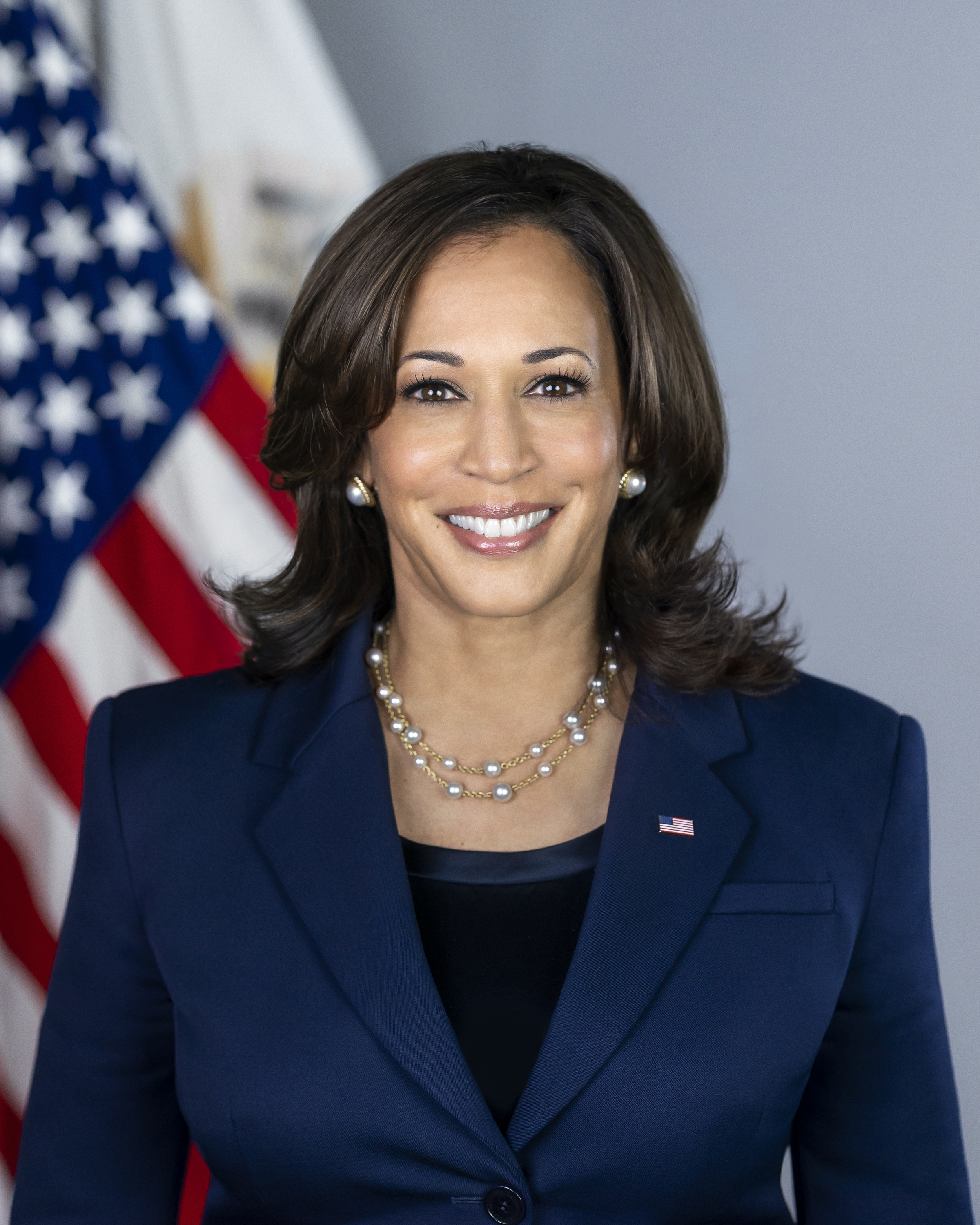
Official portrait of Vice President Kamala Harris, 2021

On August 11, 2020, then-presumed Democratic party presidential nominee Joe Biden announced that he had chosen Harris as a running mate. On August 19, 2020 Harris became the third female U.S. vice presidential nominee of a major party, after Geraldine Ferraro and Sarah Palin. She is also the first African-American to be nominated by a major U.S. political party for the candidacy of Vice President. Harris became the running mate alongside former vice president Biden as Democratic nominee for the 2020 election.

On November 7, 2020, CNN and other news outlets announced President Joe Biden's victory with Trump having no possible path to presidency based on electoral votes. The win made Kamala Harris the first Black woman and first Indian American to win an election as a vice presidential candidate in the history of the United States. Harris was sworn in on January 20, 2021 becoming the first female, first African American and first Asian American vice president in U.S. history. Harris would later become the first female to serve as acting president of the United States.

=== Presidential campaigns ===
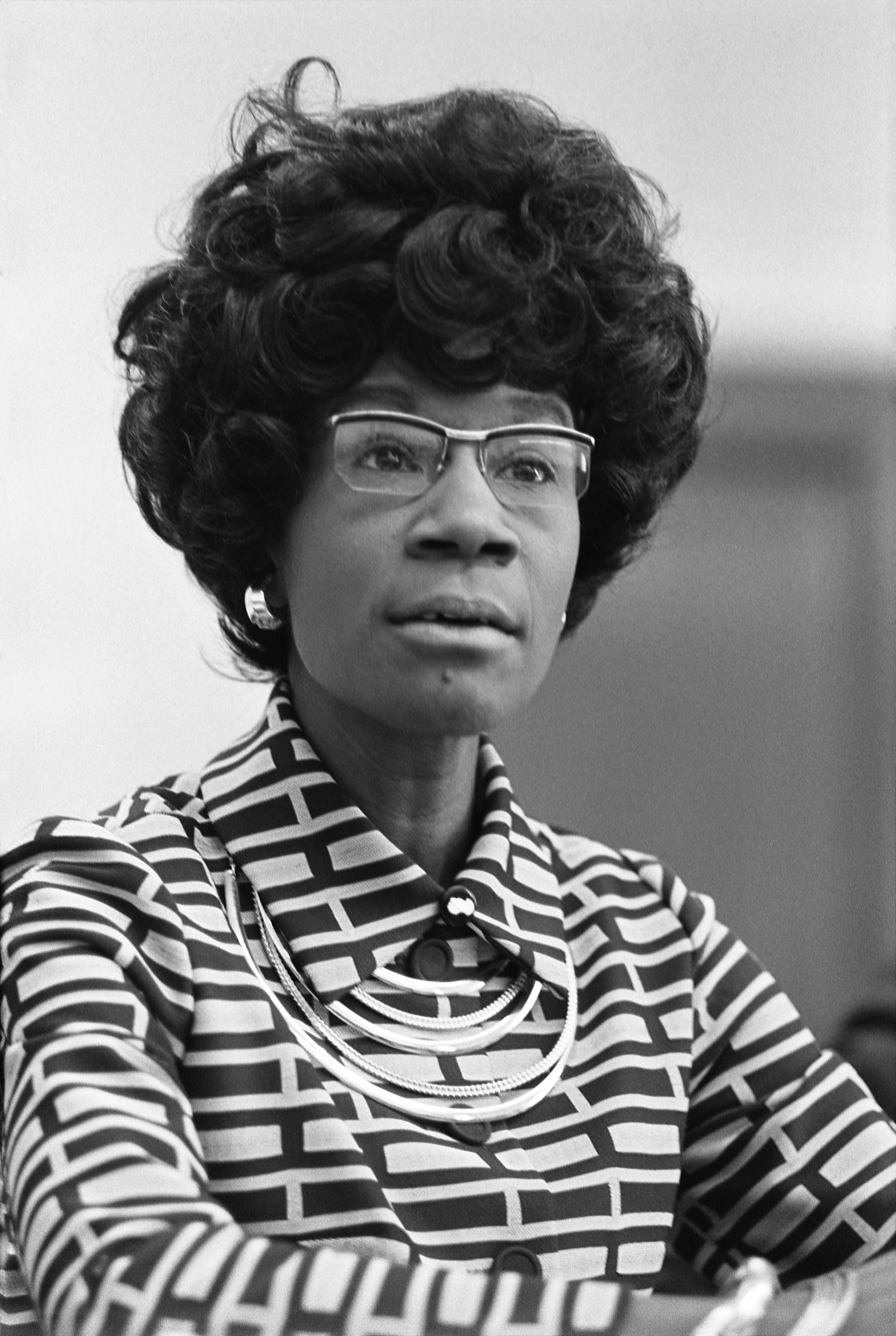
Shirley Chisholm ran for president of the United States in 1972.

Though Black women have run for presidential nomination in several campaigns, many have been labeled as "non-viable" due partly to their party affiliations, i.e., Charlene Mitchell in 1968 for the Communist Party USA, Lenora Fulani in 1988 for the New Alliance Party, and Cynthia McKinney in 2008 for the Green Party. Shirley Chisholm ran as both the "Black candidate" and the "woman candidate" in the 1972 presidential campaign and "found herself shunned by leaders from the political establishments she helped to found—the Congressional Black Caucus and the National Women's Political Caucus." Still, Chisholm was able to gain 151 votes at the Democratic National Convention, despite missing the presidential nomination. This has led to there being not one Black woman who has been the president of the United States.

Although the office of the First Lady of the United States is not a political office, Michelle Obama, the first Black First Lady, has made an impact on women in the 21st century. Obama became first Lady of the United States in 2009, when her husband, Barack Obama, took office as President of the United States. Michelle Obama has donated her services to soup kitchens, homeless shelters, and other urban social services, but she eventually found her niche in childhood obesity. Ms. Obama created Let's Move! in an effort to reduce childhood obesity around the nation.

On January 21, 2019, Kamala Harris, junior United States Senator from California, officially announced her candidacy for President of the United States in the 2020 United States presidential election. Over an estimated 20,000 people attended her formal campaign launch event in her hometown of Oakland, California.

While Harris initially had high numbers over several of her opponents, she fell in the polls following the second presidential debate. On December 3, 2019, Harris withdrew from seeking the 2020 Democratic presidential nomination, despite having been considered a potential front runner initially for the 2020 Democratic nomination for President.

Kamala Harris was the Democratic Nominee for the 2024 United States presidential election, losing the election to Donald Trump. If elected, she would haven been the first woman to serve as president of the United States.

== Misogynoir in politics ==
Misogynoir is misogyny directed towards Black women where race and gender both play roles in bias. The term was coined by queer Black feminist Moya Bailey and was created to tackle the misogyny directed toward Black women in American visual and popular culture as well as in politics. In the U.S. political sphere, misogynoir has led to the lack of Black women in politics. The number of Black elected officials has increased since 1965, however Black people remain underrepresented at all levels of government. Black women make up less than 3% of U.S. representatives and there were no Black women in the U.S. Senate as late as 2007.

In comparison to Black men, Black women tend to be more active participants in the electoral process and this could lead to more potential for Black women to equal or surpass Black men in the number of elected officials within their race. However, because of issues of both race and gender it has been much harder for Black women to rise in the political sphere. Discrimination against Black women also makes them significantly more likely to experience the Glass Cliff phenomenon. When fighting for equal voting rights, Black women have found that they are often surrounded by sexist men who did not want them to rise in power, as well as racist white women who did not consider them to be equals.

=== Misogynoir and birtherism in the 2020 presidential campaign ===
Before and after Vice President Kamala Harris was announced as 2020 Democratic nominee Biden's running mate, she became the subject of unsubstantiated claims regarding her eligibility to serve as both president and vice president. The claim that Vice President Harris was not born in the United States, therefore not a natural citizen, was made by far-right conspiracy theorist, fraudster, and internet troll (Note: Birth date and birthplace; Far-right; Conspiracy theorist; Fraudster; Internet troll) Jacob Wohl on January 22, 2019 on Twitter. Later that same day, his tweet was labeled false by PolitiFact. Numerous fact-check articles evaluated the claim as false and stated that Harris was a natural-born citizen as required by the Constitution in order for her to serve. This was something that another Black presidential candidate, Barack Obama, had been accused by Donald Trump of having an illegitimate birth certificate. Trump rescinded his comments before the 2016 United States presidential election, but later doubled down on them after winning.

An opinion piece was published in Newsweek shortly after Biden's announcement titled, "Some Questions for Kamala Harris About Eligibility". The piece disputed the current common interpretation of birthright citizenship under the United States v. Wong Kim Ark and wrote that "under the 14th Amendment as originally understood", if Harris' parents were not citizens or permanent residents of the United States at the time of her birth, she could not be considered a citizen of the United States, and therefore would be ineligible to serve as vice president. After receiving a strong backlash to the article, Newsweek added a preceding editor's note and published an opposing argument, authored by Eugene Volokh, a legal scholar at the UCLA School of Law. Newsweek later replaced the editor's note with a formal apology, writing

This op-ed is being used by some as a tool to perpetuate racism and xenophobia. We apologize. We entirely failed to anticipate the ways in which the essay would be interpreted, distorted and weaponized. The op-ed was never intended to spark or to take part in the racist lie of Birtherism, the conspiracy theory aimed at delegitimizing Barack Obama, but we should have recognized the potential, even probability, that that could happen.

Then-President Donald Trump commented at the time, "I heard it today that she doesn't meet the requirements. I have no idea if that's right. I would have thought, I would have assumed, that the Democrats would have checked that out before she gets chosen to run for vice president."

Similar accusations were made of 44th president Barack Obama during his 2008 presidential campaign and throughout his presidency. There was extensive public questioning of Obama's religion, birthplace, and citizenship. This eventually came to be termed as the "birther movement", by which it was widely referred across media. Even after the Obama campaign released his birth certificate, birther claims remained and followed Obama throughout and after his presidency.

Goldie Taylor, a commentator for the news site The Grio, characterized the demand that Obama provide his birth certificate as an equivalent of making him "show his papers", as Black people were once required to do under Jim Crow laws. Taylor also commented on the renewed birtherism targeted against Harris:

Today, Black women are the dominant force—if not the deciding factor—in national Democratic politics. Our rise exposes and jeopardizes their white privilege—which one does not lose based on ideology. (...) Just as Barack Obama was and continues to be assailed by some of the left's most prominent voices, Harris will face more of the same. It appears virulent misogyny is not beneath them.

Harris has also been attacked for her ethnic heritage. Harris' father, Donald Harris, is a Jamaican-American economist and professor emeritus at Stanford University, while her mother, Shyamala Gopalan, was an Indian American biomedical scientist, born in British India. While Vice President Harris has long identified as both Black and Indian, some people have criticized Harris for identifying as Black, conflating ethnicity and skin color. In an article published by Reuters, the matter was addressed through fact check on August 21, 2020:

Throughout her political career, the media has used many terms, including Black, South Asian, and African American, to describe Harris.

Reuters also fact-checked rumors circulating on Facebook that an image of Harris's birth certificate identified her as "Caucasian", which was ruled as false by the news agency.

=== Arrest of Georgia Representative Park Cannon ===
On March 25, 2021, Governor Brian Kemp signed a controversial voting bill into law, which was strongly criticized by lawmakers on the left, including President Biden, who said the Georgia law would disenfranchise voters of color. As Governor Kemp held the signing ceremony, Representative Park Cannon of the 58th district knocked on the Governor's office doors in an attempt to join the meeting. The Georgia State Patrol officers who stood guard outside the doors asked her twice to stop knocking. Officers then handcuffed Cannon and charged her with felony obstruction and "preventing or disrupting General Assembly sessions or other meetings of members" because she "knowingly and intentionally did by knocking the governor's door during session of singing [sic] a bill." Cannon's arrest affidavit for the felony obstruction charge also stated that she was violent toward the officers as they removed her from the premises. The incident was captured on video by onlookers and sparked a public backlash toward the officers and Georgian Republican lawmakers as videos of the arrest were distributed to the press and social media accounts.

Constituents began protesting in support of Cannon, and her arrest was cited by some media outlets to be unconstitutional based on the Georgian state constitution. The state constitution reads that legislators are “free from arrest during sessions of the General Assembly” except for charges of treason, felonies or breach of the peace.

Cannon later wrote on social media website Twitter, “I am not the first Georgian to be arrested for fighting voter suppression. I’d love to say I’m the last, but we know that isn’t true.”

Senator Raphael Warnock visited Cannon's home and commented on the incident, “We are witnessing right now, a kind of wrestling in the soul of Georgia. Will we go forward or will we go backwards? We will not allow a few politicians, in their craven lust for power, to take us back.”

The incident sparked significant backlash toward both the officers, Georgian Republican lawmakers, and a public outcry throughout the nation. Fulton County, Georgia District Attorney Fani Willis, declined to prosecute Cannon, stating:

While some of Representative Cannon’s colleagues and the police officers involved may have found her behavior annoying, such sentiment does not justify a presentment to a grand jury of the allegations in the arrest warrants or any other felony charges.

The arresting officer stated that he was concerned about an insurrection similar to the one on January 6, 2021 at the U.S. Capitol and felt that if he hadn't taken action, “other protesters would have been emboldened to commit similar acts.”

== Organizations ==
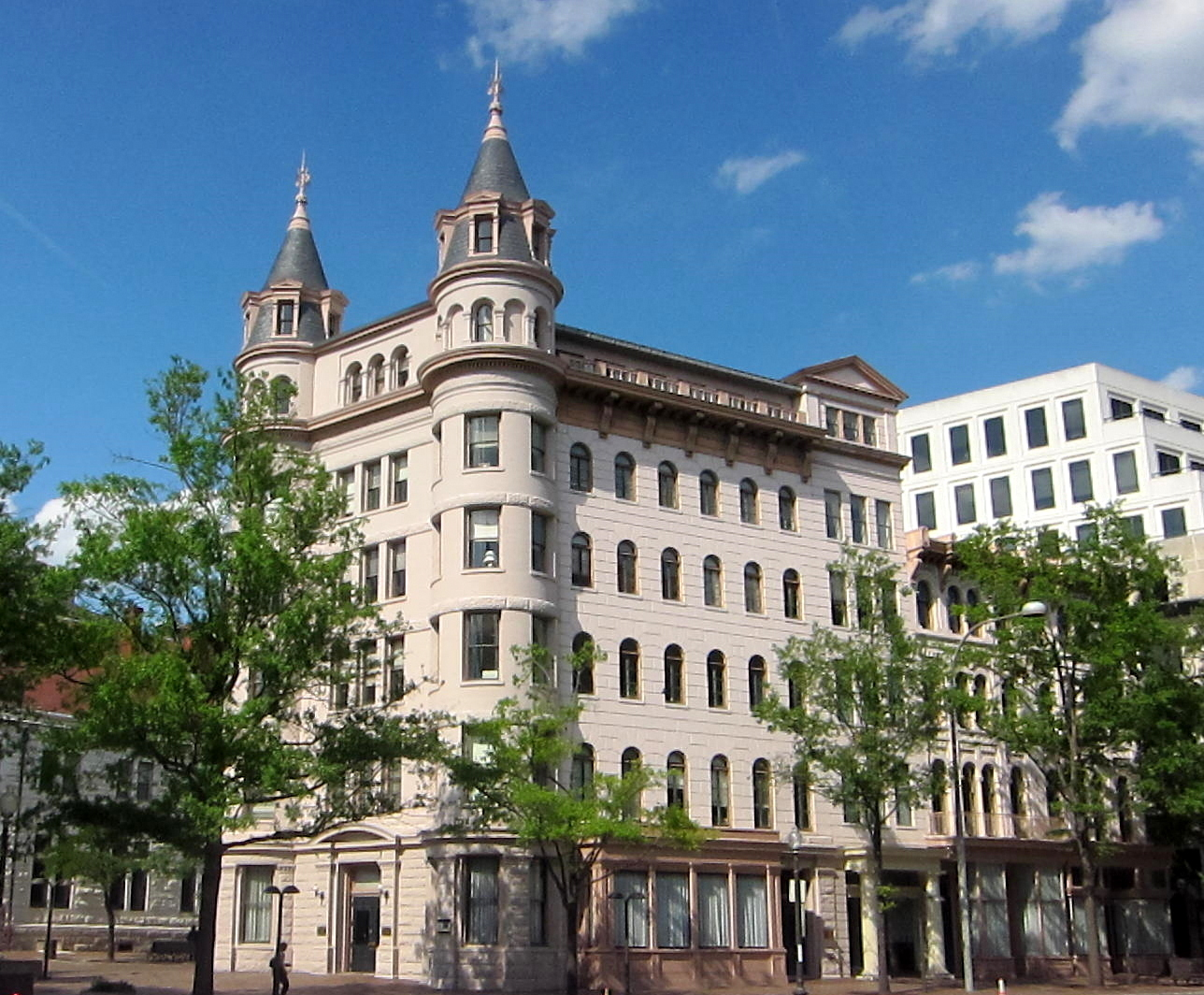
The National Council of Negro Women, located at 633 Pennsylvania Avenue in Washington, D.C., exists today as a non-profit organization.

A number of organizations supporting Black women have historically played an important role in politics. The National Association of Colored Women (NACW), founded in 1896 by Josephine St. Pierre Ruffin and Mary Church Terrell, is one of the oldest political groups created for and by Black women. Among its objectives were equal rights, eliminating lynching, and defeating Jim Crow laws. Another organization, the National Council of Negro Women (NCNW), was founded in 1935 by civil rights activist Mary McLeod Bethune and was more involved in Black political matters with the aim to improve the quality of life for Black women and their families. NCNW still exists today as a non-profit organization reaching out through research, advocacy, and social services in the United States and Africa.

In 1946, Mary Fair Burks founded the Women's Political Council (WPC) as a response to discrimination in the Montgomery League of Women Voters, who refused to allow Black women to join. The WPC sought to improve social services for the Black community and is famously known for instigating the Montgomery bus boycott.

In the 1970s, the National Black Feminist Organization (NBFO) sought to address issues unique to Black women such as racism, sexism, and classism. Though in previous years feminism and suffrage had been considered a white women's fight, NBFO "refused to make Black women choose between being Black and being female." Margaret Sloan-Hunter, one of its founders, went on to help found Ms. Magazine, a magazine focusing on a feminist take on news issues. Though the organization had disintegrated by 1977, another organization, which formed just a year after the NBFO in 1974, turned out to be one of the most important Black feminist organizations of our time. Combahee River Collective was founded by Black feminist and lesbian, Barbara Smith, and described themselves as a "collective of Black feminists [...] involved in the process of defining and clarifying our politics, while [...] doing political work within our own group and in coalition with other progressive organizations and movements." Perhaps the most notable piece to come out of the Combahee River Collective was the Combahee River Collective Statement, which helped to expand on ideas about identity politics.

In 2014, political activist and women's rights leader Leslie Wimes founded the Democratic African-American Woman's Caucus (DAAWC) in Florida. She enlisted the help of Wendy Sejour and El Portal mayor Daisy Black to help Black women in the state of Florida have a voice. In the last two presidential elections, the turnout percentage of Black women was greater than all other demographic groups, yet has not translated into more Black women in office nor political power for Black women. Virginia Governor Terry McAuliffe credits Black women for his win in the state. Black women-owned businesses are the fastest growing segment of the women owned business market. The DAAWC seeks to increase the number of elected Black women on the State and Federal levels, as well as focus on issues specific to Black women. While the DAAWC begins in the state of Florida, the organization is hoping to expand to other states to mobilize the political power of Black women.

Assata's Daughters was founded in March 2015 by Page May in order to protest against the lack of response to Eric Garner's death. Centered in Chicago, Assata's Daughters is named after controversial Black Panther Party and Black Liberation Army member Assata Shakur. The organization is part of a cluster of Black activist organizations known as the Movement for Black Lives. Assata's Daughters has worked to speak out against police militarization, immigrant deportation, the Dakota Access Pipeline, and President Donald Trump.

== Socio-political movements ==
=== 20th century ===
==== Civil rights ====
The civil rights movement in the United States was a decades-long struggle by Black Americans to end legalized racial discrimination, disenfranchisement and racial segregation in the United States. The social movement's major nonviolent resistance campaigns eventually secured new protections in federal law for the human rights of all Americans. During this time women had very few opportunities for leadership positions within the movement, leaving them to tend to informal leadership or supportive roles in the background. Still, some women made an impact in the movement, such as Coretta Scott King, Dorothy Height, and Septima Clark.

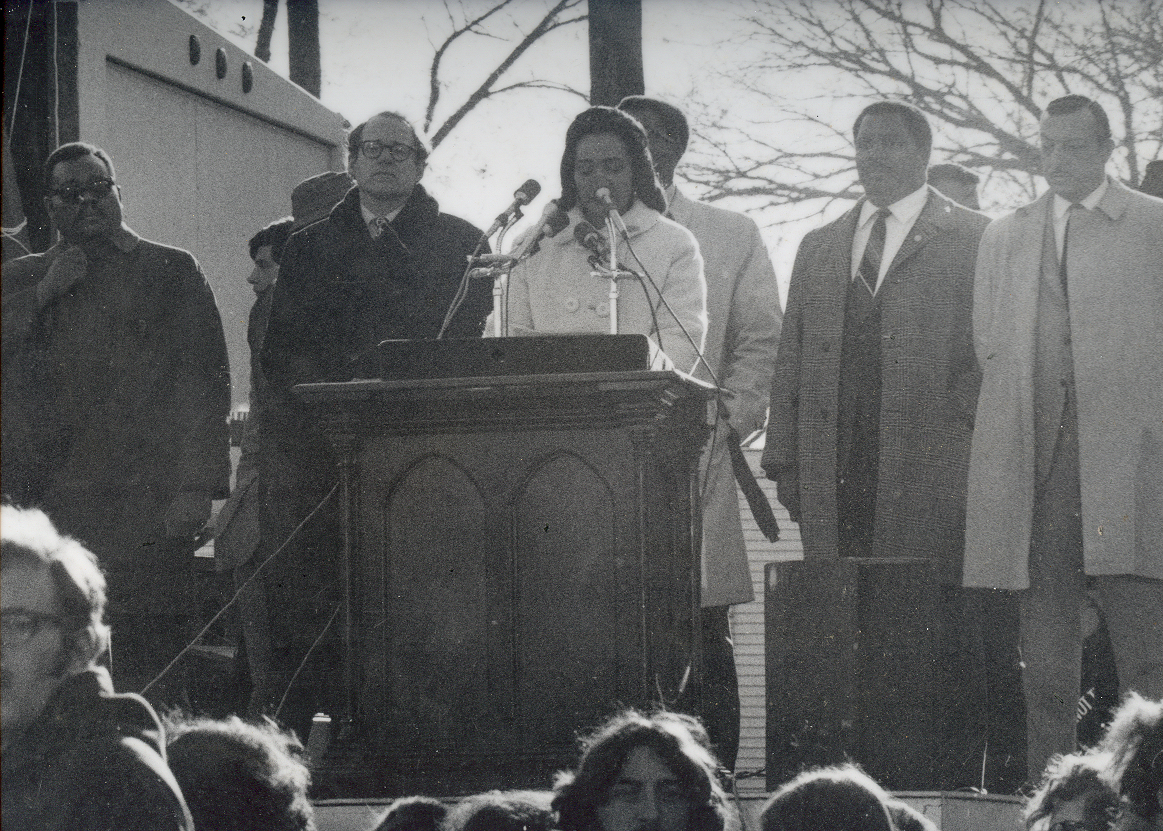
Coretta Scott King in Manhattan Central Park just after the assassination of Dr. King

Coretta Scott King, wife of Martin Luther King Jr., was an active advocate for racial equality, she was a leader for the Civil rights movement in the 1960s. King played a prominent role in the years after her husband's assassination in 1968 when she took on the leadership of the struggle for racial equality herself and became active in the Women's Movement. Coretta Scott King founded the King Center and sought to make her husband's birthday a national holiday. She later broadened her scope to include both advocacy for LGBT rights and opposition to apartheid. She was inducted into the Alabama Women's Hall of Fame, the National Women's Hall of Fame, and was the first Black person to lie in repose the Georgia State Capitol. King has been referred to as "First Lady of the Civil Rights Movement".

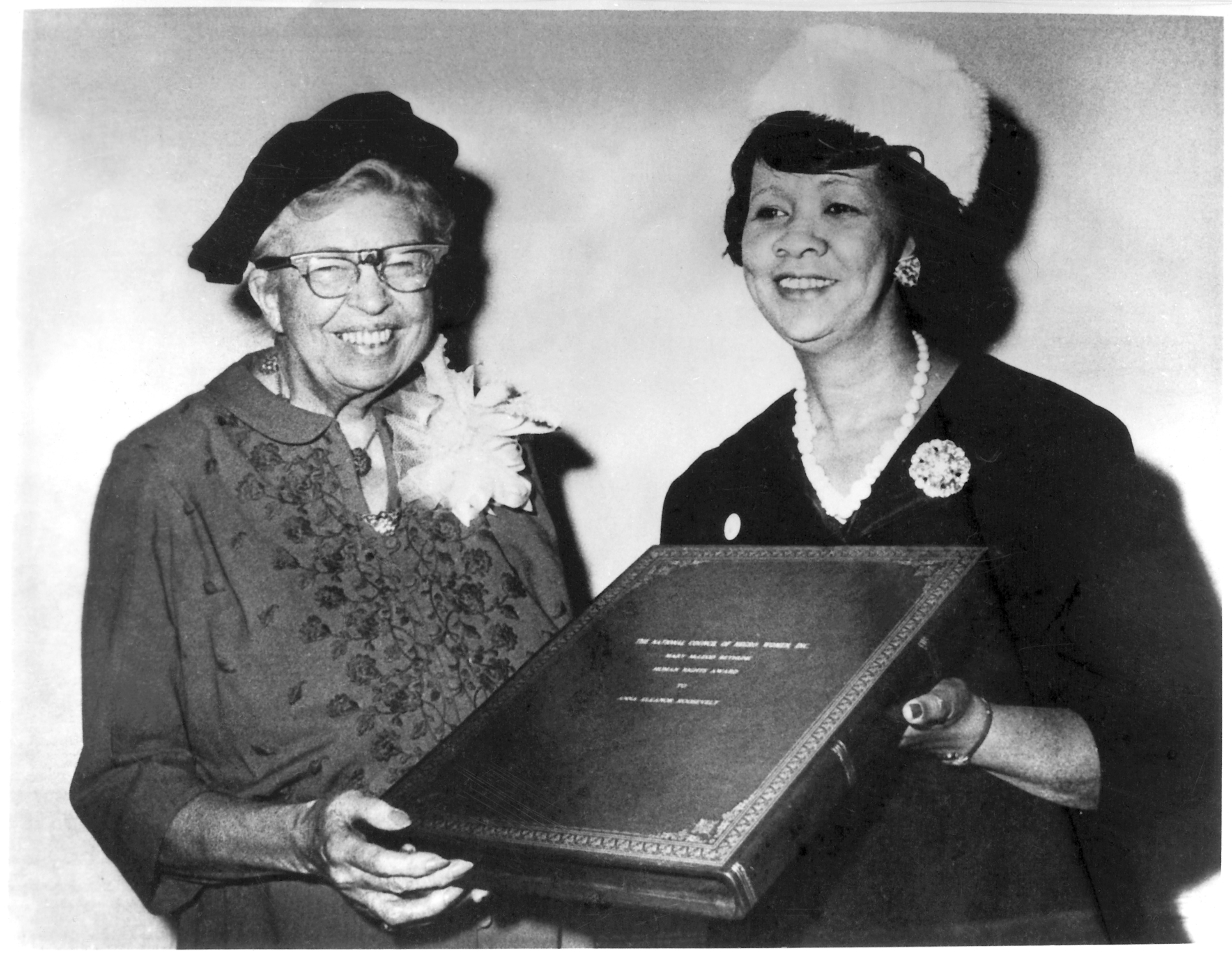
Dorothy Height presents Eleanor Roosevelt with the Mary McLeod Bethune Human Rights Award, 12 November 1960.

Dorothy Height is credited as the first leader during the civil rights movement to recognize inequality for both Black people and women of any color concurrently and was the president of the National Council of Negro Women for forty years. Height started working as a caseworker with the New York City Welfare Department, and at the age of 25, she began a career as a civil rights activist and joined the National Council of Negro Women. During the Civil Rights Movement, Height organized "Wednesdays in Mississippi," which brought together both Black and white women from the North and South to create a dialogue of understanding. She fought for equal rights for both Black people and women of all races. Height was one of the only known women to partake in the organization of the March on Washington for Jobs and Freedom. Upon working with Martin Luther King Jr., Height stated that King had once told her that Height was responsible for making The NAACP look acceptable during difficult times in the movement. In his autobiography, civil rights leader James Farmer described Height as one of the "Big Six" of the Civil Rights Movement as behind the scenes and sharing the podium with Dr. King, but noted that her role was frequently ignored by the press due to sexism. Height was also a founding member of the Council for United Civil Rights Leadership.

Septima Clark is most known for establishing "Citizenship Schools" that taught reading to adults throughout the Deep South. These schools played an important role in the drive for voting rights and civil rights for Black people in the Civil Rights Movement and served as a means to empower Black communities. Clark's goals for the schools were to provide self-pride, cultural-pride, literacy, and a sense of one's citizenship rights. Teaching reading literacy helped countless Black southerners push for the right to vote and developed future leaders across the country. The citizenship schools were also seen as a form of support to Martin Luther King Jr. in the nonviolent Civil Rights Movement. Clark became known as the "Queen mother" or "Grandmother" of the Civil Rights Movement in the United States, and Martin Luther King Jr. commonly referred to Clark as "The Mother of the Movement".

==== Abolition of police departments ====
Since the 1960s, municipal governments have increasingly spent larger portions of their budgets on law enforcement than social and rehabilitation services. Ideas to reallocate funds from law enforcement to social services were not novel in the 1960s. In 1935, W. E. B. Dubois wrote about "abolition-democracy," in his book, Black Reconstruction in America. Activists such as Angela Davis also advocated for the defunding or abolition of police departments throughout the 20th and 21st centuries.

=== Modern movements ===
==== #MeToo ====
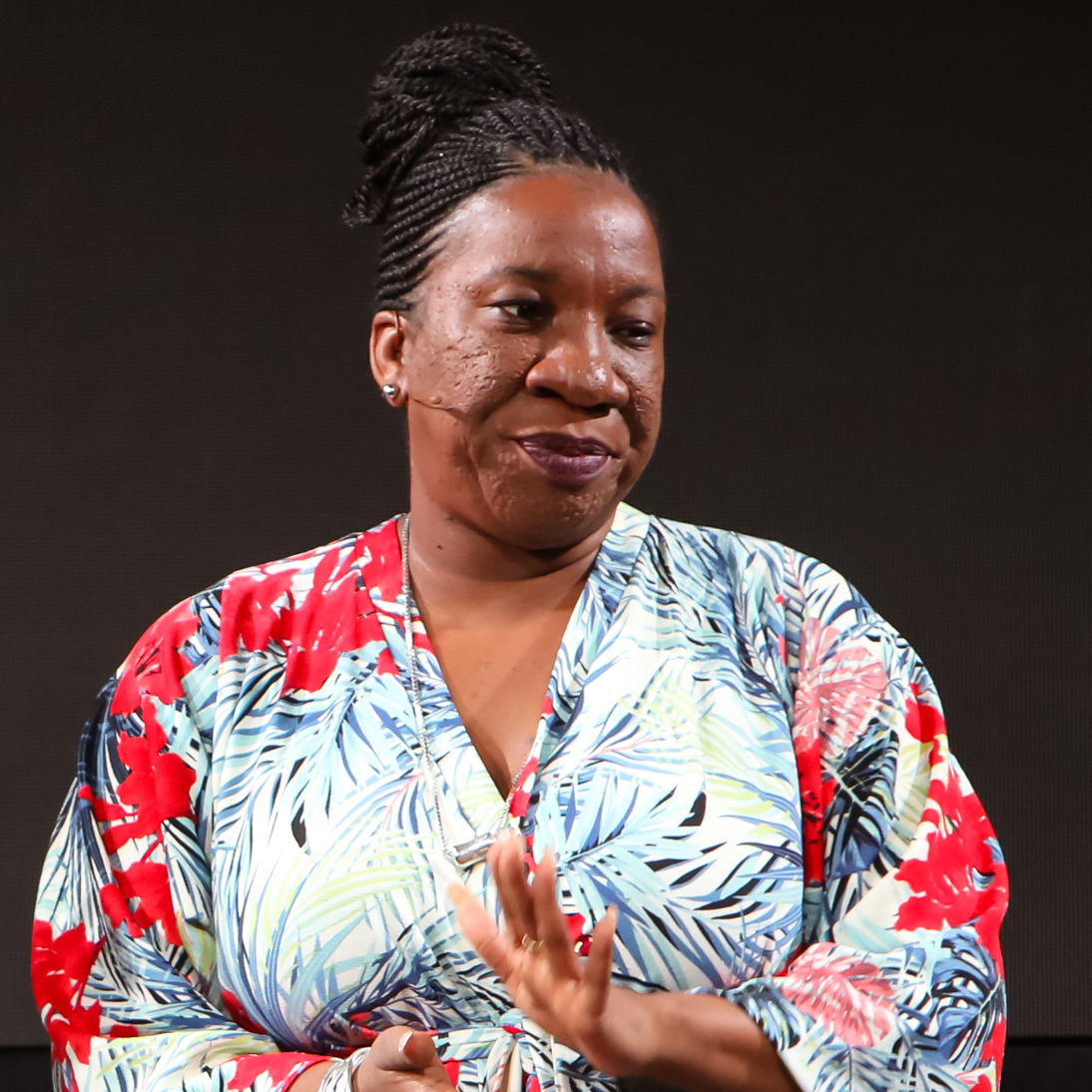
Tarana Burke at the 2018 Disobedience Awards

In 2006, social activist and community organizer Tarana Burke began using the phrase "Me Too" on the Myspace social network. Burke's original intention of "Me Too" was to empower women through empathy and solidarity, especially the young and vulnerable, by visibly demonstrating how many women have survived sexual assault and harassment, especially in the workplace. It wasn't until October 2017 during the midst of widespread exposure of accusations of predatory behavior by Harvey Weinstein, that awareness rose after actress Alyssa Milano encouraged the use of the phrase as a hashtag. Her intent was for social media to help reveal the extent of problems with sexual harassment and assault. The day after Milano tweeted the hashtag, she wrote: "I was just made aware of an earlier #MeToo movement, and the origin story is equal parts heartbreaking and inspiring", crediting and linking to Burke. Burke said she was inspired to use the phrase after her lack of response to a 13-year-old girl who confided to her that she had been sexually assaulted. She said she wishes she had simply told the girl: "Me too".

A number of high-profile posts and responses from American celebrities soon followed, and the movement exposed several high-profile men of systematic sexual abuse, such as Bill Cosby, Kevin Spacey, Harvey Weinstein, Matt Lauer. Another notable exposal included R. Kelly.

Me Too has received criticism from people who have cited reasons such as it not having due process, victims coming out too late, and "going too far in labeling things," while also using it as a reason for them to not include women in their own activities for fear of being punished and getting in trouble.

The criticisms have been the vocal minority however, as "More than twice as many Americans support rather than oppose the #MeToo movement."

==== Black Lives Matter ====
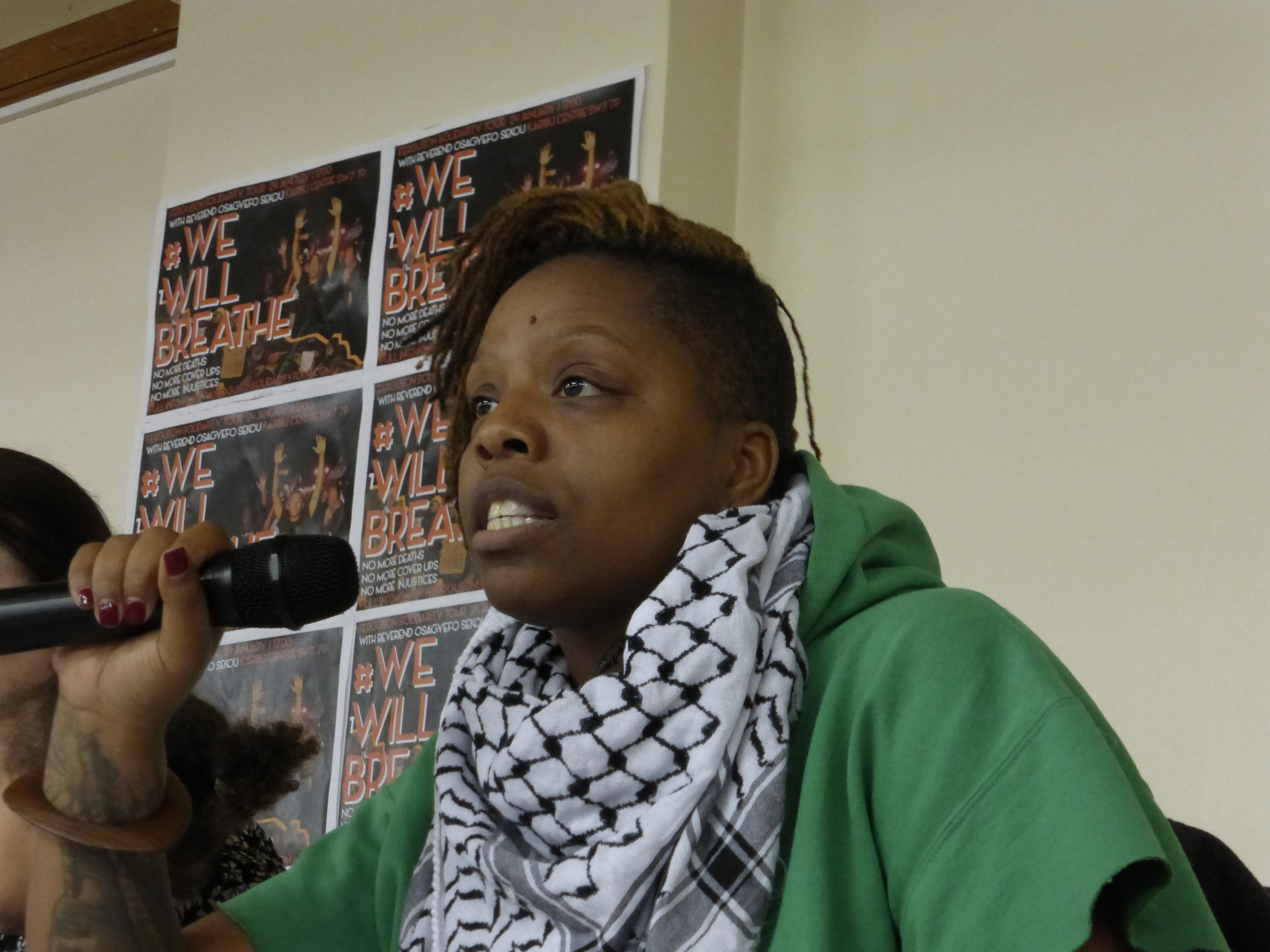
Patrisse Cullors

Black Lives Matter was co-founded by three Black community organizers: Alicia Garza, Patrisse Cullors, and Opal Tometi. The movement began with the hashtag #BlackLivesMatter on social media platform Twitter after frustration over George Zimmerman's acquittal in the shooting of 17-year-old African-American Trayvon Martin in 2013. Garza wrote a Facebook post titled, "A Love Note to Black People" in which she said: "Our Lives Matter, Black Lives Matter". Cullors then created the hashtag #BlackLivesMatter to corroborate Garza's use of the phrase. Tometi added her support, and Black Lives Matter was borne as an online campaign. In particular, the movement was borne and Garza's post became popularized after protests emerged in Ferguson, Missouri, where an unarmed Black teenager was shot and killed by a white police officer.

Cullors has acknowledged social media as responsible in exposing violence against Black Americans, saying: "On a daily basis, every moment, Black folks are being bombarded with images of our death ... It's literally saying, 'Black people, you might be next. You will be next, but in hindsight it will be better for our nation, the less of our kind, the more safe it will be."

Garza does not think of the Black Lives Matter movement as something created by any one person. She feels her work is only a continuation of the continued historical resistance led by Black people in America. The movement and Garza are credited for popularizing the use of the internet for mass mobilization between activists in different physical locations; a practice called "mediated mobilization," which has since been used by other movements such as the #MeToo movement.

===== #SayHerName =====
Women from within the Black Lives Matter movement, including Ohio State University professor and civil rights advocate Treva Lindsey, have argued that Black Lives Matter has sidelined Black women's experiences in favor of those of Black men. For example, more demonstrations have been organized to protest the killings of both Michael Brown and Trayvon Martin than the killings of either Kayla Moore or Rekia Boyd. In response, #SayHerName is a movement founded in 2015 to focus specifically on the police-related killings of Black women and to bring their names into the Black Lives Matter protest. The stated goal is to offer a more complete, but not competing, narrative with the overall Black Lives Matter movement. With the shooting of Breonna Taylor by police in her bed as she slept on March 13, 2020, #SayHerName has become even more prominent.

== Activists ==
=== 19th century ===
- Sadie L. Adams
- Sarah Allen
- Ruth L. Bennett
- Irene Moorman Blackstone
- Mary E. Bibb
- Sarah Mapps Douglass
- Margaretta Forten
- Eliza Ann Gardner
- Sarah J. Garnet
- Frances Harper
- Mary Ellen Pleasant
- Josephine St. Pierre Ruffin
- Harriet Tubman
- Sojourner Truth
- Ida B. Wells
- Henrietta Wood

=== 20th century ===
- Juanita Abernathy
- Sadie L. Adams
- Ella Baker
- Josephine Baker
- Willie Barrow
- Charlotta Bass
- Mary McLeod Bethune
- Unita Blackwell
- Mary Booze
- Dorothy Boulding Ferebee
- Ida M. Bowman Becks
- Lillie Mae Bradford
- Mary Fair Burks
- Eva Carter Buckner
- Catherine Burks-Brooks
- Theresa Burroughs
- Nannie Helen Burroughs
- Roberta Byrd Barr
- Mae Bertha Carter
- Septima Clark
- Claudette Colvin
- Dorothy Cotton
- Thelma Dailey-Stout
- Angela Davis
- Ruby Dee
- Juliette Derricotte
- Oberia Dempsey
- Doris Derby
- Annie Devine
- Theresa El-Amin
- Ruth Ellis
- Fannie Emanuel
- Myrlie Evers-Williams
- Sarah Mae Flemming
- Martha E. Forrester
- Marie Foster
- Lucille Gorham
- Mamie Garvin Fields
- Rosa Slade Gragg
- Victoria Gray Adams
- Major Griffin-Gracy
- Fannie Lou Hamer
- Elizabeth Harden Gilmore
- Dorothy Height
- Lola Hendricks
- Gloria Johnson-Powell
- Prathia Hall
- Florynce Kennedy
- Annie Lee Cooper
- Irene McCoy Gaines
- Modjeska Monteith Simkins
- Irene Moorman Blackstone
- Kathleen Neal Cleaver
- Rosa Parks
- Jo Ann Robinson
- Edythe Scott Bagley
- Patricia Stephens Due
- Marian Wright Edelman

=== 21st century ===
- Melina Abdullah
- Nekima Levy Armstrong
- Jamila Bey
- Kat Blaque
- London Breed
- Cat Brooks
- Tarana Burke
- Gwen Carr
- Vednita Carter
- Ann Nixon Cooper
- Amariyanna Copeny
- Patrisse Cullors
- Brittany Packnett Cunningham
- Theresa El-Amin
- Johnetta Elzie
- Jordan Emanuel
- Yvette Flunder
- Alicia Garza
- Erica Garner
- Haben Girma
- Amanda Gorman
- Miss Major Griffin-Gracy
- Nikole Hannah-Jones
- Elle Hearns
- Isra Hirsi
- Blair Imani
- Janaye Ingram
- Janetta Johnson
- Jackie Aina
- Meghan Markle
- Marissa Johnson
- Imara Jones
- June Jordan
- Christelyn Karazin
- Danielle N. Lee
- Nekima Levy Armstrong
- Brittany Lewis
- Evelyn G. Lowery
- Tamika Mallory
- CeCe McDonald
- Vanessa McNeal
- Stephanie Mingo
- Ethel Minor
- Toni Newman
- Jewel Prestage
- Ashlee Marie Preston
- Eva Lewis
- Ijeoma Oluo
- Candace Owens
- Ryann Richardson
- Sadie Roberts-Joseph
- Carolyn Rouse
- Aria Sa'id
- SheraSeven
- Afeni Shakur
- Nadine Smith
- Sonja Sohn
- Christale Spain
- Rashida Strober
- Willa Mae Sudduth
- Stephanie Summerow Dumas
- Tourmaline (activist)
- Opal Tometi
- Chloé Valdary
- Naomi Wadler
- Karen Washington
- Mary Williams (activist)
- Tiffany Willoughby-Herard

== See also ==
- African-American women's suffrage movement
- Africana womanism
- List of African-American United States Senate candidates
- Sexism in American political elections
- Women in government
