= SJI =

SJI may refer to:

- St. Joseph's Institution, a school in Singapore
- St. John's Institution, a school in Kuala Lumpur, Malaysia
- South Jersey Industries, an energy services holding company
- San Juan Island, USA
- The St. James Infirmary Clinic in San Francisco, California
- State Justice Institute, a United States federal grant-making organization to improve justice in state courts
- San Jose Airport (Mindoro), Philippines (IATA code)
