= Karazin =

Karazin (Russian: Каразин) is a Russian masculine surname, its feminine counterpart is Karazina. It may refer to

- Christelyn Karazin, American writer, columnist, and blogger
- Nikolay Karazin (1842–1908), Russian military officer, painter and writer
- Vasily Karazin (1773–1842), Russian intellectual, inventor and scientific publisher

== See also ==
- Karamzin
