= Irene Moorman Blackstone =

African-American businesswoman and club member

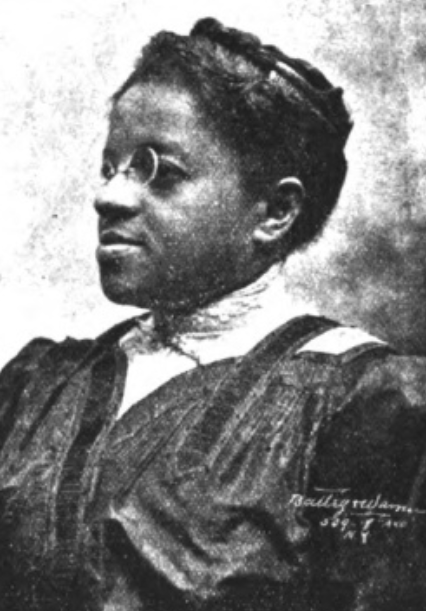
- Moorman, 1907
- Born: Irene L. Moorman; January 1872; Virginia
- Died: after 1944
- Other names: I. L. Moorman, Irena M. Blackstone, Irena Moorman-Blackston, Irene Moorman, Irene Morman, Irene Mormon, Irene M. Blackston, Irene Moorman-Blackstone
- Occupations: Businesswoman, clubwoman, suffragette
- Years active: 1895–1944

Irene Moorman Blackstone (January 1872 – after 1944) was an African-American businesswoman and club member who became active in the fight for women's suffrage. Along with Alva Belmont, she initiated the interracial cooperation of women in the drive for enfranchisement. When the 19th Amendment passed, she turned her activism toward the Universal Negro Improvement Association (UNIA) and other programs which worked to uplift the black community and prevent the exclusion of and discrimination against blacks in attaining socio-economic and political equality.

== Early life ==
Irene L. Moorman was born in January 1872 in Virginia. Her mother was a former slave, Johanna (née Enders) Moorman, who had been born in Virginia and in her childhood moved to Washington, D. C. Johanna later returned to Virginia, where she gave birth to 18 children before bringing her daughter Irene and son Wilson to New Jersey.

== Career ==
Though a gifted singer, Moorman did not pursue music professionally, instead focusing on business development. Around 1895, Moorman began a career as a sub-agent in the brokerage business. After four years, she began working at the Metropolitan Mercantile and Realty Company, supervising the firm's operations in Brooklyn. She served on the board of the National Association of Colored Women's Clubs, and was an active member of the women's auxiliary of the Negro Business League of New York.

In 1906, she founded the Metropolitan Business Woman's Club of Brooklyn. The stated purpose of the club was to secure funding for the construction of a building which could be used for organizational meetings of black businesses and associations. Her efforts were endorsed by several widely-known African-American activists, such as Dr. M. Cravath Simpson and Mary Church Terrell.

After collecting sufficient funds, a building was secured and three rooms outfitted, as well as a business office. In 1909, Moorman incorporated the Moorman-Harper Company, with the purpose of managing the hall. The action brought conflict from members of the Metropolitan Club, who alleged she had usurped the project for which they had raised the funds. After judgments were brought against her, Moorman began operating as a newsdealer. In 1910, she took up the cause of suffrage, answering the call of Alva Belmont to join her Political Equality League. She became a regular speaker in regard to women's suffrage, bolstering her image as an active clubwoman and well-known socialist.

On November 24 or 28, 1911 in Brooklyn, Moorman married James H. Blackston, a farmer and minister of the Negro Baptist Church. The couple separated in May 1912 and Blackston struggled financially during their separation. She was investigated for alleged fraud for attempting to secure assistance through the mail system. Rev. Blackston filed for an annulment in 1914. He lost his case that they had been married under false representations, claiming he did not know of her previous lawsuits. His case was dismissed in 1915 by the judge who ordered him to pay damages to his wife. One year later, in March 1916, she sued for separation and was awarded alimony of $3 per week.

That same year, Blackston was one of the people who attended Marcus Garvey's first public lecture in New York City and in 1917, became the president of the Ladies' Division of the New York Chapter of Universal Negro Improvement Association (UNIA). When Garvey relocated his headquarters from Jamaica to New York City, in 1918, Blackston, Carrie B. Mero and Harriet Rogers were the three women who assisted him in incorporating the UNIA and were appointed to his six-member board of directors. She continued her activities in various clubs and was often a featured singer or speaker, both locally and outside New York City, appearing in Philadelphia as well as at a memorial for Madam C. J. Walker in 1919.

When the fight for women's suffrage ended with the passage of the 19th Amendment, Blackston, turned her attentions to Garveyism. She became one of the first to purchase stock in his Black Star Line venture when it launched in 1919. She recognized that political activism at the grassroots level was effective in lobbying for socio-economic equality. Long a proponent of uplifting black society and businesses, she suggested that blacks boycott white businesses and create their own enterprises to fill the gaps. By the early 1920s, she was styling her name as Irene or Irena Moorman Blackstone and would use this name for the remainder of her life.

In 1930, Blackstone was selected as vice president of the New York City Federation of Women's Clubs and the following year, she took on the mantle of president of both the local branch and state branch of the federation. Throughout the 1930s, she continued to speak and rally for recognition of the black community and women's rights. Known as a fiery and inspiring speaker, she participated in debates rallying women to the Democratic Party and urging the National Council of Women of the United States to defend the rights of all citizens to vote, regardless of their race or previous servitude. In 1944, she was elected as a vice president in the Ethiopian World Federation.

== Death and legacy ==
Blackstone is remembered for her role in integrating the suffrage fight, bringing racial cooperation into the New York suffrage campaign. She is also remembered for her long service in supporting black unity as a means to acquiring socio-economic and political equality. Irene Blackstone died at age 65 in the Bronx in New York City on April 14, 1951.
