= Oberia Dempsey =

American minister (1914–1982)

The Reverend Oberia Dempsey
- Born: 1914; Roxton, Texas, United States
- Died: October 2, 1982 (aged 67); New York City, New York, United States
- Education: Brooklyn College (BA); New York University
- Occupation: Baptist minister
- Years active: 1953–1982
- Known for: Fighting drug use in Harlem
- Children: 4

Oberia D. Dempsey (1914 – October 2, 1982) was a Baptist pastor in Harlem, New York City, primarily known for his activism against drug trafficking and addiction.

Born in Roxton, Texas, to a Baptist minister, Dempsey briefly attended Wiley College before joining the Army and being sent to Europe in World War II. He later attended Brooklyn College and New York University. In 1953, he became a minister. His first position was as youth director of Cornerstone Baptist Church in Brooklyn. He later became associate minister of Abyssinian Baptist Church under the direction of Adam Clayton Powell Jr. In 1962, he left Abyssinian to start his own church. In 1961, Dempsey entered the Democratic primary race for the New York City Council's 21st District in Harlem. He lost in the primary election, receiving 8,732 votes, while his opponent Herbert B. Evans, the former New York Parole Commissioner, received 19,910.

Dempsey founded Upper Park Avenue Baptist Church on 125th Street. He used the church as a place to crusade against drug dealing and to try to reform addicts. He founded a rehab clinic called House of Hope and also led an Anti-Narcotics and Anti-Crime Committee. He also engaged in high-profile rallies against drugs and brought police to Harlem apartments where he thought drugs were being sold. The church ultimately moved to a new location, but Dempsey continued to be its pastor.

Dempsey carried a revolver with him at all times, including in the pulpit. He died from a pulmonary embolism on October 2, 1982, at Harlem Hospital.

Dempsey had four children, one of whom was also a minister.

The Oberia D. Dempsey Multi-Service Center in Harlem is named for him.
