= Toni Newman =

African-American transgender author and sex workers' rights advocate

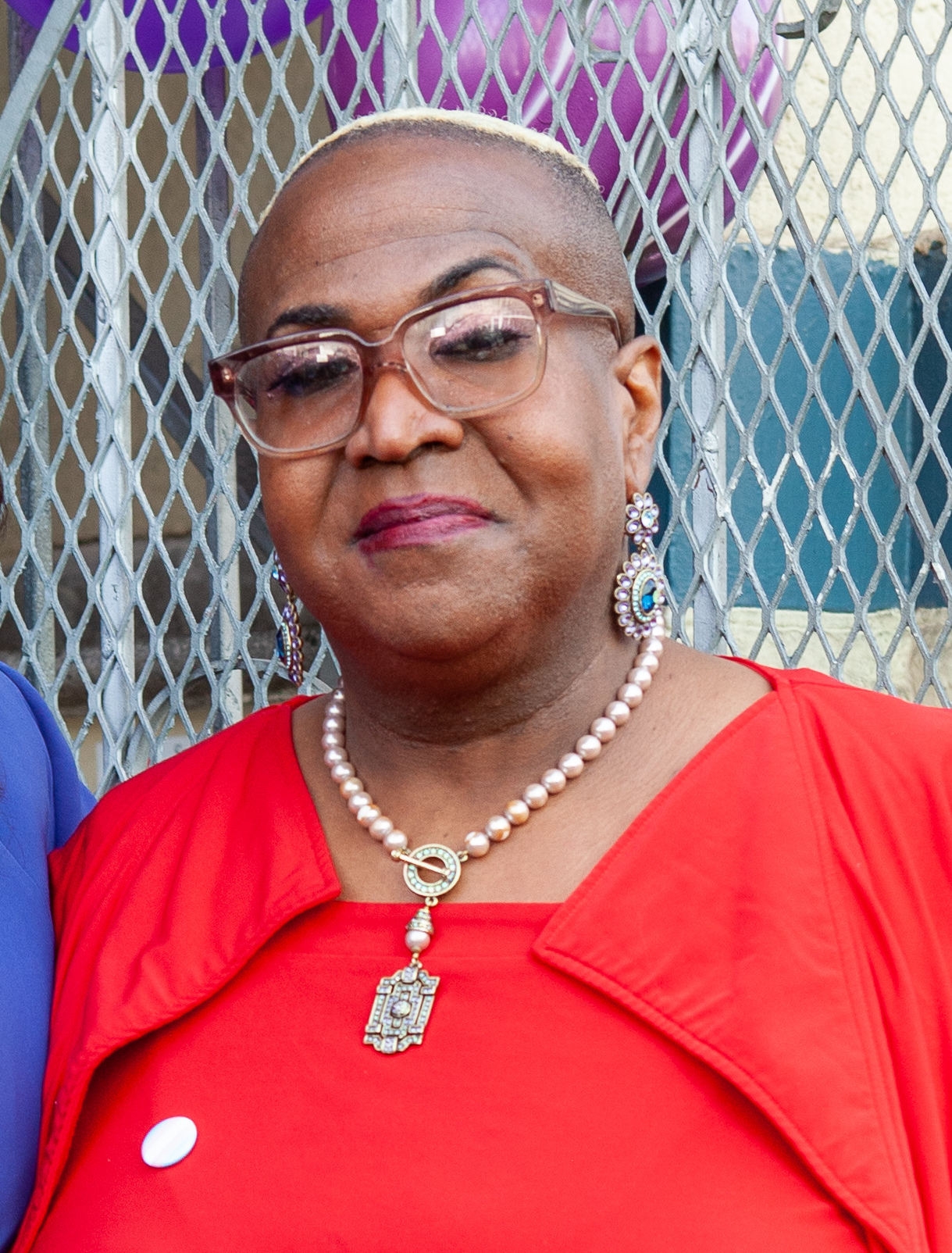
- Born: December 3, 1962 (age 63); Jacksonville, North Carolina, United States
- Education: Wake Forest University (BA)
- Alma mater: Wake Forest University
- Occupations: Author, advocate
- Employer: NMAC
- Organization(s): TransCanWork, California Black Leadership Council, Los Angeles County Workforce Development Board
- Notable work: I Rise-The Transformation of Toni Newman
- Partner(s): Domestic partner Alton Willoughby, 2004-present
- Website: tonidnewman.com

Toni D. Newman (born December 3, 1962) is an African-American transgender author, sex workers' rights advocate, Director of The Coalition for Justice and Equality Across Movements at National Minority AIDS Council (NMAC), Chair of the Board for TransCanWork, and the Former Interim CEO of the Black AIDS Institute and former Interim Executive Director/President for LYRIC in San Francisco. She was the former Executive Director of St. James Infirmary in San Francisco. Newman is also the Membership Chair for the California Black Leadership Council and a Board member of the Los Angeles County Workforce Development Board.

She is the author of I Rise-The Transformation of Toni Newman, a 2011 memoir about her gender transition which was nominated for multiple Lambda Literary Awards and became the basis for a short film, Heart of a Woman.

Newman was raised in Jacksonville, North Carolina. She graduated from Wake Forest University in 1985. Prior to becoming Executive Director of St. James Infirmary in May 2018, Newman worked as interim director of development and communications for the To Help Everyone Health and Wellness Center in Los Angeles, as a strategic fundraiser and legislative aide for Equality California, and as development officer for Maitri Compassionate Care.

She has received awards and recognitions, including the 10 Most Influential Black Leaders To Watch in 2024 by the Leaders Globe Magazine, the 2024 Anthem Awards Gold Medal Nonprofit Leader of the Year for Diversity, Equity, and Inclusion, and the Exemplary Service Luminary Award by the National Bar Association in 2024. In addition, Newman received the GLMA Achievement Award for Advocacy in 2024 and the Unity Award from the Williams Institute of the UCLA School of Law in the same year.

Newman has been in a relationship with the American producer and writer Alton Willoughby since 2004.
