= St. James Infirmary Clinic =

Peer-based occupational health and safety clinic for sex workers in San Francisco, CA

The St. James Infirmary (abbreviated SJI), founded by members of the sex worker activist community in 1999, was a peer-based, full spectrum medical and social service organization serving current and former sex workers of all genders and their families. Located in the Tenderloin district in San Francisco, California, the St. James Infirmary was a 501(c)(3) public charity. Its services were free and confidential. Named after the sex workers' rights activist and founder of COYOTE (Call Off Your Old Tired Ethics), Margo St. James, the St. James Infirmary was the first occupational safety and health clinic for sex workers run by sex workers in the United States.. It stopped operating December 29, 2023.

== History ==
In 1993, the San Francisco Board of Supervisors passed legislation that called for the establishment of the San Francisco Task Force on Prostitution. This Task Force was formed to investigate, "prostitution patterns", and to "recommend social and legal reforms which would best respond to the City’s needs while using City resources more efficiently". In 1996, the Task Force issued its final report and determined that the city's responses to prostitution were not only ineffective, but also harmful. Pertaining to health, safety and services, the report stated that, "programs should include occupational and educational programs, health and other programs for those who continue working as prostitutes, as well as those who wish to transition into other occupations".

Under "Hold and Treat" laws, persons arrested for prostitution charges would be forcibly tested and treated for sexually transmitted infections. In 1998, Margo St. James, a local sex workers' rights activist and COYOTE member, received a call from a woman in jail who had been arrested for prostitution, who told Margo that while held awaiting charges, her blood had been drawn without the woman's consent and without her knowledge of what test was being performed. Margo called the Director of STD Control and Prevention of the San Francisco Department of Public Health, Dr. Jeffrey Klausner. Dr. Klausner invited members of the sex worker community for a meeting on the health status of sex industry workers. Before this meeting, Dr. Klausner was aware that the San Francisco Department of Public Health was not "really working with the sex worker population and/or the massage parlor workers. So [he] wanted to initially do some outreach to those populations" (J. Klausner, interview, September 4, 2003). This was the beginning of conversations and alliances to be made that provided the framework for a peer led occupational health and safety clinic for sex workers. The St. James Infirmary was made possible because of the unique vision of sex worker rights activists from COYOTE and the Exotic Dancers Alliance (EDA) and a timely event in the San Francisco County Jail. Via collaboration with the Department of Public Health STD Control and Prevention Section (known as "City Clinic"), University of California San Francisco (UCSF), COYOTE and EDA, in 1999, the first Occupational Health and Safety Clinic run by and for Sex Workers was created.

Located in the South of Market district of San Francisco, the mission of the St. James Infirmary was to provide compassionate and non-judgmental health care and social services for all sex workers while preventing occupational illnesses and injuries through a comprehensive continuum of services. Annually, St. James provided 8,000 clinic and venue based services to thousands of sex workers in the Bay Area. The St. James Infirmary services included Primary Care, Gynecological and Urological Care, Transgender Hormone Therapy, HIV/STI, TB & Hepatitis Counseling and Testing, STI treatments, Hepatitis A & B Immunizations, Acupuncture, Massage & Reiki Therapy, Peer and Mental Health Counseling, Support Groups, Food and Clothing, Syringe Access & Disposal, Condoms & Lube, Information & Service linkages, Apprenticeship & Internship Programs, and Research & Education.

There are many factors which affect the working conditions and experiences for all sex workers including the political and economic climate, poverty and homelessness, stigmatization, violence, as well as the overwhelming intricacies of the legal, public and social systems. The fear of stigma and indeed, the very real stigma associated with this work itself, forces many sex workers into isolation. This isolation puts sex workers at greater risk of occupational health and safety hazards that would otherwise be preventable. Sex Workers—particularly prostitutes— constitute some of the most socially isolated and politically marginalized individuals in the nation.

Some medical clinicians assume that the primary health concern of sex workers must be sexually transmitted infections or HIV prevention, while the stated health concerns of sex workers outside of STIs and HIV are met with minimal care or insensitive and disrespectful treatment. Sex Workers often do not disclose their profession to their health care providers for fear of arrest or of receiving inadequate care, among other concerns. As most sex workers will not identify as such to their providers, existing service organizations are often misinformed or ill-equipped to address the overall occupational health and safety concerns for sex workers that impact their sexual health practices.

In the early 1990s COYOTE member Priscilla Alexander developed the program plan for the St. James Infirmary that was founded on a holistic approach towards healthcare for sex workers as determined by the community rather than just focusing on HIV and STI prevention and treatment. Thus, the mission of St. James was to provide compassionate and non-judgmental health care and social services for all sex workers while preventing occupational illnesses and injuries through a comprehensive continuum of services. It was the philosophy of St. James Infirmary to build upon existing skills and strengths in order to allow individuals to determine their own goals while providing culturally competent and non-judgmental services.

The Infirmary was run by and serves current and former sex workers from the many sectors of the adult entertainment industry that include escorts, sensual massage workers, exotic dancers, peep show workers, BDSM workers, adult film actors, nude models, Internet pornography workers, street and survival sex workers, phone sex operators, and many more.

Since SJI was a multi-service clinic, it challenged centuries of beliefs pertaining to the perceived health needs of the sex worker population. Instead of solely focusing on the sexual health needs of sex workers, the St. James Infirmary combined best practices from Eastern and Western medical to address all the potential holistic health needs of sex workers. The goals of the Infirmary were:

1. To increase access to primary healthcare and social services for Sex Workers within the San Francisco Bay Area
2. To increase formalized communication, cooperation, coordination, and collaboration among individuals and agencies within the San Francisco Bay Area and other areas who serve Sex Workers.
3. To promote community-based public health initiatives on behalf of Sex Workers, which may be used as a model for improving occupational health and safety standards and developing comprehensive medical and social services for Sex Workers nationally and internationally.

Toni Newman became executive director of St. James Infirmary in May 2018.

== Recognition ==
In January 2012, the "Someone You Know is a Sex Worker" campaign was nominated by the Global Network of Sex Work Projects (NSWP) for a consultancy to the World Health Organization (WHO), in collaboration with UNFPA, UNDP and NSWP. St. James presented the campaign to WHO in Geneva, Switzerland in January 2012.

In November 2004, San Francisco Board of Supervisors members Aaron Peskin and Chris Daly proclaimed November 13, 2004 to be “St. James Infirmary Health Day” in San Francisco. In addition, the St. James Infirmary was awarded the 2009 Community Service Award by the Harvey Milk Lesbian, Gay, Bisexual, Transgender Democratic Club.

In the July 2003 issue of the San Francisco Bay Guardian, SJI received an award for the “Best Place to Find Sex-Worker Community.” The award was created to acknowledge SJI, and therefore is illustrative of the fact that SJI has been recognized and appreciated by the larger San Francisco community. As stated in the Bay Guardian, “In a field where isolation from your colleagues is common – and a society in which few people outside the trade accept the validity of your work – the infirmary provides an oasis of camaraderie and understanding”.

== Publications and presentations ==
- "SJI Occupational Health & Safety Handbook 3rd Edition" (2010)
- "Criminalization, legalization or decriminalization of sex work: what female sex workers say in San Francisco, USA" Reproductive Health Matters, 2009.
- "Sex Worker Health, San Francisco Style" Sexually Transmitted Infections Online, July 19, 2006.
- "Can the Decriminalization of Sex Work Assist HIV Prevention?"

Sex Worker Environmental Assessment Team(SWEAT) Study data prepared by Alix Lutnick and Deb Cohan, presented at the XVII International AIDS Conference in Mexico City, August 6, 2008.

- "Working Conditions, HIV, STIs and Hep. C Among Female Sex Workers in San Francisco"

SWEAT Study data prepared by Alix Lutnick and Deb Cohan, presented at the XVII International AIDS Conference in Mexico City, August 6, 2008.

- "RenegadeCast: Evaluating Podcast Social Media as a Health Promotion Tool for Sex Workers & Adult Entertainers with Internet Access"

Culminating experience project for the Masters in Public Health program at SFSU conducted by Executive Director Naomi Akers, MPH(c) in collaboration with Melissa Gira Grant and St. James Infirmary staff, 2007.

- "A Pilot Health Assessment of Exotic Dancers in San Francisco"

A summer internship project conducted by current Executive Director Naomi Akers, as part of the Masters of Public Health Program at San Francisco State University, 2006.

- "Social Content and the Health of Sex Workers in San Francisco"

Collaborative study project between the University of California at San Francisco, the St. James Infirmary, and the San Francisco Department of Public Health. Funding provided by the Ford Foundation and the San Francisco Department of Public Health.

- "The Health Needs of Sex Workers, A Descriptive Study"

Presentation authored by Chuck Cloniger, FNP & Deborah Cohan, M.D., in collaboration with the San Francisco Department of Public Health and UCSF Department of Obstetrics & Gynecology.

- "Sex Worker Health, San Francisco Style; The St. James Infirmary"

Presentation of research results from the collaborative efforts of SJI staff, UCSF Department of Obstetrics & Gynecology and the San Francisco Department of Public Health, 2002.

- "Providing Educational Opportunities to Sex Workers" – Annie Sprinkle's dissertation for her PhD at the Institute for Advanced Study of Human Sexuality, 2002.
