= M. Cravath Simpson =

American singer

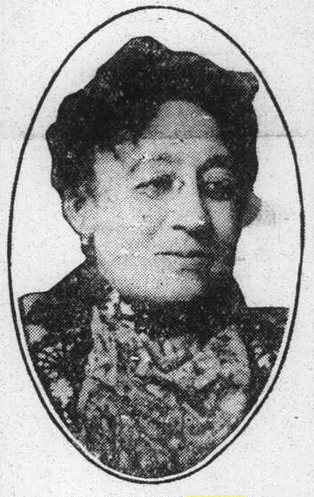
- Simpson in 1910
- Born: Minnie Mahala Cravat (also shown as Cravath and Cravatt); December 6, 1860; Cumberland, Providence County, Rhode Island
- Died: May 19, 1945 (aged 84); Boston, Massachusetts
- Other names: Maud Cravath Simpson, Minnie Simpson, Cravath M. Simpson
- Occupations: Singer, public speaker, clubwoman, podiatrist
- Years active: 1891–1940

M. Cravath Simpson (December 6, 1860 – May 19, 1945) was an African-American activist and public speaker. She began her career as a singer, then studied podiatry, but is best known for her work to uplift the black community and combat lynching. Based in Boston, Simpson spoke throughout the Northeastern and Midwestern United States, advocating for the human rights of black citizens.

== Early life ==
Mary Mahala Cravat, known as Minnie, was born on December 6, 1860, in Cumberland, to Sarah B. (née Eldridge) and John A. Cravat. She was the youngest of three children, with a brother, Eldridge, and a sister, Clara. Her father, a mulatto born in Pennsylvania to a French father, was a barber who served in Company A, Regiment 11 of the Union Army's Colored Heavy Artillery Unit from August 10, 1863, to October 2, 1865. After graduating high school in Rhode Island, Cravat married Charles Harry Simpson on October 30, 1882, in Providence and moved to Boston. She continued her studies, training as a contralto for the next seven years.

== Career ==
Simpson debuted as a singer in 1891 and performed at Madison Square Garden before retiring from singing in 1895. After leaving performing, Simpson became a public speaker and studied at the Boston College of Chiropody, graduating as a chiropodist in 1911. From 1903 to 1940, she spoke throughout the Northeastern Seaboard and Midwest, on lynching and racial inequality.

In addition to her career, Simpson was an active clubwoman, involved in founding organizations such as the Woman's Era Club (1892), where she was secretary for 14 years, and the Harriet Tubman House (1903). The Era Club and its founder, Josephine St. Pierre Ruffin, urged the formation of the National Association of Colored Women, which Simpson joined in 1896. That same year, Simpson became a member of the Northeastern Federation of Women's Clubs (1896) and chaired its anti-lynching committee. She became chair of the Federation in 1918.

When William Monroe Trotter formed the Negro American Political League in 1908, splitting from the NAACP over whether the association should be black-led or allow whites to lead and participate, Simpson, along with Pauline Hopkins, Rev. Matthew A. N. Shaw, and Ida B. Wells, supported the organization. She was president of the Anti-Lynching Society of Afro-American Women, formed around 1911, and led the creation of the Massachusetts State Union of Black Women's Clubs (1914), acting as its inaugural president from 1914 to 1916 and again from 1922 to 1924. In these roles, she worked to protect the human rights of African Americans and ensure respect, equality, and justice.

== Death and legacy ==
In February 1945, Simpson's apartment building caught fire, and she was hospitalized for shock. She died three months later on May 19, 1945, in Boston. In 1968, she was listed by The Boston Globe as one of the "Black Brahmins" of Boston, "a remarkable lot, [who] though not revolutionaries themselves, they tilled the ground and prepared the way" for the Civil Rights Movement.
