= Rashida Strober =

American dramatist

Rashida Strober is an American playwright and dark-skin activist.

Strober is known for her to play A Dark Skinned Woman's Revenge about her experiences as a dark-skinned Caribbean-American woman. The play debuted in St. Petersburg, Florida, in 2011. The play was later adapted into a book.

Strober is also a "dark skin activist" working for the acceptance of dark-skinned people.
