= Vanessa McNeal =

American social activist, public speaker, and documentary filmmaker

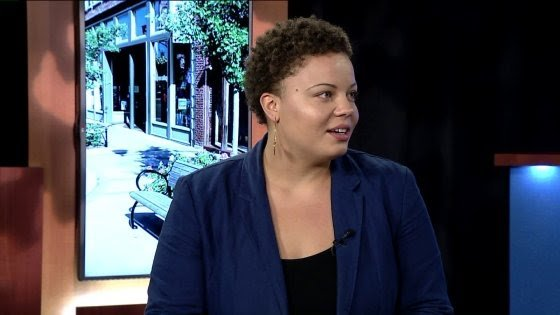
- A capture from McNeal's 2019 news interview on WHO TV
- Born: August 3, 1993 (age 33); Davenport, Iowa, United States
- Education: Iowa State University, University of Northern Iowa
- Occupations: Social activist, public speaker, documentary filmmaker
- Website: www.vanessamcneal.com

Vanessa McNeal-Atadoga (born August 3, 1993) is an American social activist, public speaker, and documentary filmmaker. She directed the documentary that features stories of five male survivors of sexual violence titled The Voiceless, and We Are Survivors, a documentary that examines the experiences of eight victims of sexual abuse.

In 2019, McNeal released her fourth documentary film, Gridshock, to expose the sex trafficking industry in the state of Iowa. She is a two-time Tedx speaker.

== Education ==
McNeal graduated from Iowa State University in 2015 with a Bachelor of Science degree in Child, Adult and Family Services and a Master of Social Works degree from the University of Northern Iowa in 2017.

== Career ==
McNeal's career in filmmaking, social activism and public speaking began after the release of her first film titled I am: The Vanessa McNeal Story. Since then she has spoken at various college events and the US National Guard. She has produced three other documentary films: We are Survivors, The Voiceless, and Gridshock.

In 2015, she began making films that focus on investigating sexual violence and influencing social change by producing a short film about her childhood experiences with sexual abuse. She has been hosted as a guest at several college campuses, government agencies and community events around the US to share her stories and screen her films with the aim of creating social change.

McNeal's awards include Best Director for her film The Voiceless, the Women Filmmaker Award of Recognition, the 2017 YWCA Young Woman of Tomorrow Award of Recognition, and the 2018 STATEment Maker award. In 2019 she was presented with the Outstanding Iowa Anti-Trafficking Service Award.

== Filmography ==
- I am: The Vanessa McNeal Story (2015)
- We are Survivors (2016)
- The Voiceless (2017)
- Gridshock (2019)
