= Theresa El-Amin =

African-American civic right activists

- Education: Tuskegee University
- Occupations: Civil rights activist Union organizer

Theresa El-Amin is an African-American civil rights activist, union organizer and former member of the Green Party of the United States Steering Committee.

== Biography ==
El-Amin attended Tuskegee University and became an activist in 1966 with the Student Nonviolent Coordinating Committee. She began working in Tuskegee and Atlanta. In Atlanta, El-Amin worked for the phone company and was active in the Communications Workers of America. In the 1980s and 1990s, El-Amin was involved with the Coalition of Labor Union Women, the Service Employees International Union, Solidarity, and Black Workers for Justice. She organized clerical workers at the Cleveland Public Library. Later, she helped found the United States Labor Party in 1996. She worked with Jobs from Justice from 1993 to 2006 and with the Green Party of Rhode Island in the 1990s. In 1999, she became the founding director of the Southern Anti-Racism Network.

On February 5, 2013, El-Amin announced that she had been arrested in Columbus, Georgia on unspecified charges. She continues to speak and organize around issues of racism, incarceration, the death penalty, and social justice.
