= Stephanie Mingo =

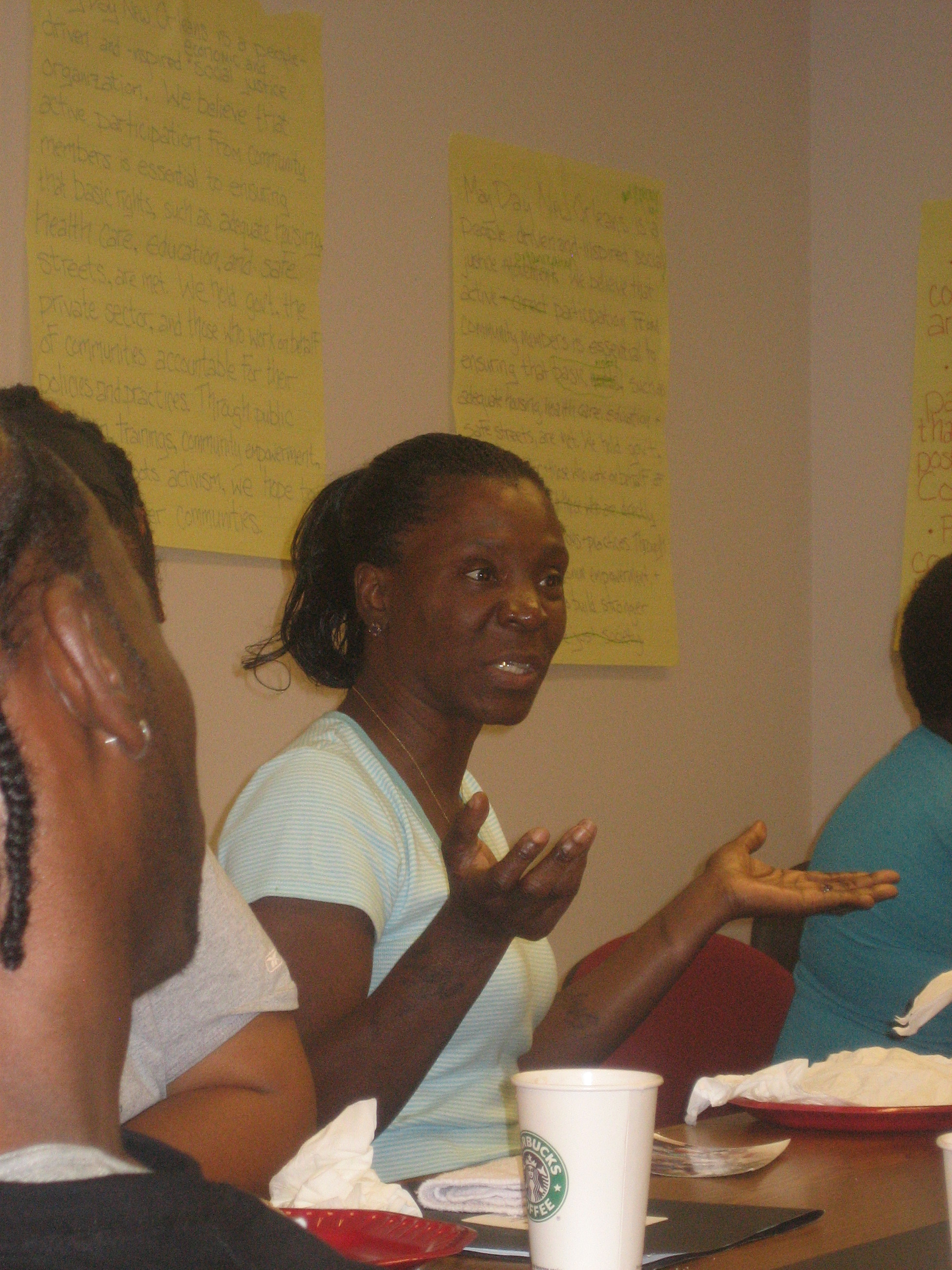
- Mingo in August 2008
- Occupation: Activist
- Known for: Gulf Coast Housing Justice

Stephanie Mingo is a housing justice activist who focuses on post-Katrina New Orleans. She was born in New Orleans and raised in the St. Bernard public housing development. She works for the Orleans Parish School Board and is a mother of four. As of 2009, she lives with her family in the Iberville housing development.

Mingo had been the third generation of her family to reside in the St. Bernard public housing development, the second largest housing project in the city. She was among many of those displaced after the storm. Mingo and her family were offered housing in the Columbia Parc Development which was being built on the same site, but refused. In early 2009 she published "Comments On the Draft 'Policy Recommendations to Support Gulf Coast Housing Recovery'" in collaboration with fellow activist Sam Jackson, criticizing a proposal for policy recommendations to the U.S. Congress over affordable housing in the Gulf Coast. The text and much of Mingo's activism focuses on the failures of a private sector driven approach to the rebuilding of the Gulf Coast. Stephanie was featured in the 2013 documentary Getting Back to Abnormal focusing on post-Katrina New Orleans, where she was depicted fighting alongside other activists against displacement in the Lower Ninth Ward.
