= SheraSeven =

American YouTube streamer (born 1979)

- Born: Leticia Padua; March 11, 1979 (age 47)
- Other name: Shera Seven
- Occupations: Livestreamer; YouTuber; financial advisor; social media personality
- Spouse: James Scott (m. 2006; died 2026)

YouTube information
- Channel: SheraSeven
- Years active: 2013–present
- Genres: Livestreaming; dating advice
- Subscribers: 836 thousand
- Views: 92 million
- Last updated: February 18, 2026

Leticia Padua (born March 11, 1979), known online as SheraSeven or Shera Seven, is an American livestreamer, YouTuber, financial advisor, a witchcraft practitioner, and social media personality. Her YouTube livestreams give dating advice to women about marrying rich and getting money from men. She is also known as the "sprinkle sprinkle lady" for her catchphrase, "sprinkle sprinkle". Clips from her livestreams began going viral on TikTok in 2023. Critics have complimented her content for its humor while also describing her as controversial, variously calling her views on heterosexual dating "deeply nihilistic", "Machiavellian", and "completely unprogressive".

== Career ==
Leticia Padua was born on March 11, 1979. She began making YouTube videos as SheraSeven in 2013. In her videos and livestreams, SheraSeven often encourages women over the age of 25 to employ persuasion tactics and reverse psychology to get rich older men to pay for their expenses while avoiding broke men, to whom she refers as "dusties", as a way to game the patriarchy. She is known online as the "sprinkle sprinkle lady" for her catchphrase, "sprinkle sprinkle", which she says after giving words of advice. Her fans have often jokingly described her as a female version of Andrew Tate. SheraSeven has personally pointed to the books of G.L. Lambert as an influence and credited his book "Ho Tactics" for helping her develop her savage persona. Critics have described her as controversial for her views on gender.

Clips of SheraSeven's livestreams began being posted on TikTok in the spring of 2023. She had over 800 thousand YouTube subscribers by November of that year. Clips of her on TikTok amassed over 20 billion views by August 2023, and videos tagged with "sprinkle sprinkle" had over two billion views on the platform by 2024. A fan account of hers, Sheralations, had almost 400 thousand followers on TikTok before being leaving the platform in 2023. Kerame Marcellus of Essence called Shera Seven "a favorite on TikTok" for her "candid dating and money advice for women online". In January 2024, SheraSeven was featured in Brandon Blackwood's Valentine's Day campaign.

== Public image ==
Steffi Cao of Bustle identified SheraSeven as one of a crop of "dark feminine" influencers, whose content "pull[s] viewers in with ... confidence and humor", and summarized their philosophy as being that "men are interchangeable, problematic, and take up too much emotional space". For Vox, Rebecca Jennings called SheraSeven "among the funniest people on the internet" and "extremely entertaining", but added that she was "part of a wave of arguably regressive and deeply nihilistic 'dating experts' currently taking over TikTok" and that "her philosophy ultimately reduces women to sexual objects whose value decreases the less traditionally attractive they become". Tara Kenny of Dazed wrote in 2023 that SheraSeven and other women dating advice influencers took "a hardline, Machiavellian stance that sets them apart from their softer, touchy-feely counterparts" and that parts of their content "fall into the same toxic thought patterns as those manosphere channels they're trying to counteract". For Indy100, Kate Plummer called her opinions on gender roles in heterosexual relationships "completely unprogressive", while Raquel Rosario Sánchez wrote for The Critic that she "dispense[d] faux-empowerment".

== Personal life ==
SheraSeven's husband, James Scott, worked as an SQL developer and appeared in the background of many of her livestreams. On February 20, 2026, she announced that James had died. They have two daughters together.
