= Christelyn Karazin =

Christelyn Karazin (born 17 July 1973) is an American writer, columnist, and blogger on the subject of interracial dating, particularly black women dating outside their race, and specifically black women dating white men. She hosts the blog "Beyond Black & White" and has written for Woman's Day, Ebony, Jet, and Reuters.

== Biography ==
Karazin graduated from Loyola Marymount University in 1999, where she earned a bachelor's degree in communication and media studies, and where she wrote for The Los Angeles Loyolan.

Her academic background laid the foundation for her subsequent career as a blogger and advocate for social issues related to relationships. Notably, in 2010, Christelyn launched the initiative "No Wedding, No Womb," aimed at addressing the high rates of out-of-wedlock births and promoting responsible fatherhood and motherhood in the African American community, after her eldest daughter asked why Karazin had not married her father.

Realizing that this was a question that many children may ask single parents, Karazin then launched "No Wedding, No Womb", which promotes the idea that couples should "abstain from having children until they are emotionally, physically and financially able to care for them."

Karazin also founded the "Pink Pill" a private community and self-improvement course for Black Women, and is part of the "Beyond Black and White" Website. It provides women with "Strategies for Living Well to the Extreme" this course has received many supporters and praises.

In 2013, Karazin launched the blogger network SheThrives and in the following year she served as the host for the dating reality web series Swirlr. Her work through her blog and other digital media has positioned her as a central figure in discussions around these topics.

== Publications ==
- Swirling: How to Date, Mate, and Relate Mixing Race, Culture, and Creed (2012, with Janice Rhoshalle Littlejohn)
