= The Young Lady with the Shiner =

1953 painting by Norman Rockwell

- Triumph in Defeat, Outside the Principal's Office
- Artist: Norman Rockwell
- Year: 1953
- Medium: oil on canvas
- Dimensions: 86 cm × 83.2 cm (34 in × 32.75 in)
- Location: Wadsworth Atheneum Museum of Art, Hartford, Connecticut, U.S.

The Young Lady with the Shiner, also known as Triumph in Defeat and Outside the Principal's Office, is an oil on canvas painting by American artist Norman Rockwell that was illustrated on the cover of The Saturday Evening Post in 1953. It depicts a young girl with a black eye sitting outside a principal's office after being involved in a fight. She is grinning, apparently fully aware of the possible consequences of her actions, yet happy with the outcome. The girl used as a model for the painting, Mary Whalen, appeared in three other works by Rockwell, including two additional Post cover illustrations, A Day in the Life of a Girl and Girl at the Mirror.

The painting is an example of the social realism movement that heavily influenced Rockwell's work. From 1916 to 1963, Rockwell produced over 300 illustrations for the Post, helping to boost its readership through his ability to capture seemingly ordinary moments in people's lives. Similar to Rockwell's depiction of Rosie the Riveter, the girl in The Young Lady with the Shiner represents female strength and challenges gender stereotypes. The painting is on display at the Wadsworth Atheneum Museum of Art in Hartford, Connecticut.

== Description ==
The Young Lady with the Shiner, also known as Triumph in Defeat and Outside the Principal's Office, is an oil on canvas painting depicting a young girl with a black eye sitting outside the principal's office after being involved in a fight. The girl has red braids in her hair and is wearing a plaid skirt. She has a big grin on her face, indicating she is proud of the fight's outcome and cares little about any consequences. It is assumed she was fighting at least one boy and that she won. In addition to the black eye, evidence of a fight includes a bandage on her knee, disheveled hair and clothing, and untied shoelaces. A principal wearing glasses and the school secretary are in the background, apparently discussing the altercation. The painting measures 34 inches (86 cm) by 32.75 inches (83.2 cm) and is on display at the Wadsworth Atheneum Museum of Art in Hartford, Connecticut.

== History ==
=== Background ===
Between 1916 and 1963, American artist Norman Rockwell produced 322 illustrations for The Saturday Evening Post. His talent for depicting aspects of American life helped increase the magazine's subscription base to almost 7 million. His most well-known illustrations for the Post include the Four Freedoms series, the Willie Gillis series, Rosie the Riveter, and Saying Grace. After leaving the magazine, Rockwell painted The Problem We All Live With and Murder in Mississippi during the civil rights movement.

Between 1939 and 1953, Rockwell lived in Arlington, Vermont, and would ask friends and locals to pose for his paintings. One of the models used during this period was Mary Whalen, the daughter of his attorney. Rockwell was attending a high school basketball game to watch his son play and sat behind Whalen and her father. Rockwell asked her if she would like to pose for one of his paintings. Whalen said "sure" even though she was unsure of what he meant. She and her mother, twin brother, and a cousin posed for Rockwell's 1951 Oh, Boy! It's Pop with a New Plymouth!, a Christmas advertisement for Plymouth automobiles.

=== Creation ===
Rockwell later used Whalen as a model for another painting, this one depicting a young girl that had been in a fight. While attending school, Whalen was told to go to the principal's office and she assumed she was in trouble. She cried while walking there, accompanied by her brother. She was relieved after seeing Rockwell standing in the office and realizing the purpose of his visit. Whalen's mother dropped off some clothes for her to wear for the sitting, including her brother's shoes, and Rockwell's wife drove her from the school to her husband's studio.

A reference photograph of Mary Whalen that Norman Rockwell used for the painting

Whalen was shown a drawing of how Rockwell wanted her to pose for the reference photographs. He asked her "Do you think you can make a big grin like that?" He told her "This is a little girl who got into a fight at school and even though she's got a black eye she's thrilled that she won the fight. Don't you have a brother that you would like to beat up?" Not satisfied with her grin, Rockwell got on his hands and knees attempting to make Whalen laugh. In her recollections of posing as the triumphant girl, Whalen said it was fun and that "It was about role reversal. For once the little girl was victorious, and it did not matter that she had a black eye. That was the mark of the trophy!"

Rockwell found it difficult to paint the black eye. He had a charcoal mix and makeup applied to Whalen's eye, but did not think it accurately portrayed the various colors of a bruise. Not satisfied with the result, Rockwell went to Putnam Memorial Hospital in Bennington, Vermont, and Pittsfield General Hospital in Pittsfield, Massachusetts, looking for patients with a black eye, but was unsuccessful. He spoke with a reporter from The Berkshire Eagle who wrote an article about Rockwell's search of someone with a "ripe" and "vivid and realistic" black eye, with an offer of $5 from the artist. Among the hundreds of people around the country to respond was a prison warden who said a recent riot had left hundreds of people with black eyes. The father of a two-year-old boy named Tommy Forsberg from Worcester, Massachusetts, contacted Rockwell after his son fell down a flight of stairs, resulting in two black eyes. Forsberg drove his son to Rockwell's studio and the artist said the black eyes were "perfect". Tommy was photographed and his injured eye was used as a reference in Rockwell's painting.

Rockwell drove to the Cambridge Central School in Cambridge, New York, and had his photographer Gene Pelham take photos of the hallway, principal's office, and the principal and secretary. The office door was temporarily removed and taken to his studio in Vermont. At his studio, Rockwell used models as stand-ins for the principal and secretary. Whalen did not pose with the adult models who were sketched at a later date. He wavered on whether or not to depict adults in the painting, but after asking fellow artist George Hughes, Rockwell chose to include them. After completing his work, the painting was illustrated on the cover of the Post on May 23, 1953.

=== Legacy ===
The Young Lady with the Shiner is considered one of Rockwell's most famous works. Similar to Rockwell's Rosie the Riveter, the painting demonstrates female strength and challenges gender stereotypes. It is representative of the social realism movement that heavily influenced Rockwell's work. The painting shows the young girl as someone who "conveys resilience and perhaps a certain irony at her situation", an example of Rockwell's ability to depict "even the most complex or seemingly trivial moments" in a person's life.

In addition to The Young Lady with the Shiner, Whalen also modeled for two additional Rockwell paintings that were used as Post cover illustrations, A Day in the Life of a Girl and Girl at the Mirror, and appeared on a calendar and a Kellogg's cereal box. Rockwell described Whalen as "the best model I ever had" and she saw him as a grandfatherly figure since she did not have one. She was given $5 and a bottle of Coca-Cola each time she posed for Rockwell, eventually saving enough money to buy a Columbia bicycle. At the age of 81, Whalen posed for artist Gary Blevins whose work draws inspiration from Rockwell and has been exhibited at the Norman Rockwell Museum.

The door to the principal's office that Rockwell used as a photo reference was later preserved when the school underwent remodeling. It is on display near the school's library along with reference photographs, a copy of the Post featuring The Young Lady with the Shiner illustration, and a modern recreation of the work by a female Cambridge student injured during a basketball game.
