= At the Optometrist =

1955 painting by Norman Rockwell

- The Oculist, Eye Doctor
- Artist: Norman Rockwell
- Year: 1955
- Medium: Oil on canvas
- Dimensions: 76 cm × 71 cm (30 in × 28 in)
- Location: Washington County Museum of Fine Arts, Hagerstown, Maryland, U.S.

At the Optometrist, also known as The Oculist or Eye Doctor, is an oil on canvas painting by American artist Norman Rockwell. It was painted in 1955 and illustrated on the front cover of The Saturday Evening Post on May 19, 1956. It was one of over 300 illustrations for the Post featuring Rockwell's work from 1916 to 1963. The painting depicts a frustrated young boy at an optometrist's office being fitted for glasses by a grinning doctor. The painting is in the collection of the Washington County Museum of Fine Arts (WCMFA) in Hagerstown, Maryland, U.S.

The WCMFA acquired the painting in 1957 after its then-director wrote a letter to an art editor from Curtis Publishing Company. Rockwell himself responded and agreed to sell his work at a low price. It has been on display at the WCMFA since then, except for when it is lent to exhibitions at other institutions, including the Norman Rockwell Museum. It has become one of the WCMFA's most popular works and was restored in 2021 on the 90th anniversary of the museum's founding.

== Description ==
At the Optometrist, also known as The Oculist or Eye Doctor, is an oil on canvas painting depicting a young boy with red hair and freckles being fitted for glasses at an optometrist's office. The boy is sitting in a chair while holding a baseball glove with one hand. A Brooklyn Dodgers hat is stuffed into his belt, indicating he would rather be playing sports than be in the office. He is pouting, appearing unhappy with having to wear glasses while the optometrist is smiling and placing the glasses on his face, perhaps realizing the boy's ability to play baseball will improve with better eyesight. The painting measures 30 in × 28 in (76 cm × 71 cm). It is on display in the Washington County Museum of Fine Arts's (WCMFA) Kerstein Memorial Gallery in Hagerstown, Maryland, U.S.

According to appraiser and author Daniel Fulco, PhD, the painting "demonstrates Rockwell's technical abilities in a way that is not easily conveyed in reproductions. The crisply defined edges of the furniture place the viewer in the sterile office, and the careful modeling of the figures conveys their body language and facial expressions. Rockwell has used a flat paint application throughout most of the painting, but in the foreground, built-up paint on the floor adds texture and liveliness. The Oculist embodies Rockwell's remarkable capacity for exploring human nature, as well as his technical gift for capturing detail with precision."

== History ==
Between 1916 and 1963, American painter and illustrator Norman Rockwell created 322 illustrations for The Saturday Evening Post. Among his most famous covers are the Four Freedoms series, Rosie the Riveter, Saying Grace, and the Willie Gillis series. After his contract ended with the Post, Rockwell painted The Problem We All Live With, which has become a defining image representing the civil rights movement in the U.S.

The Post issue on May 19, 1956, features a cover illustration of Rockwell's 1955 painting of the visit to an optometrist's office. As a child, Rockwell was taken to the optometrist due to poor vision. At the time many children found wearing glasses to be socially awkward and he was forced to wear round-lens frames. Some children found the glasses peculiar due to the lunar shape and nicknamed Rockwell "Moony", in addition to his nickname "Mercy Percy" because of his middle name, Percevel. It was perhaps due to his experience as a child that influenced At the Optometrist. Rockwell's son, Peter, may have been an inspiration for the boy's appearance in the painting. The choice of depicting the boy's Brooklyn Dodgers baseball cap was likely influenced by the team's winning the 1955 World Series. The hat was not included in the original drawing, indicating Rockwell may have finished the painting after the World Series concluded in October. The child used as a model for the painting was Ken Ingram, his neighbor's son. Much like At the Optometrist, another one of his paintings, Before the Shot, "depicts a rambunctious boy suffering through a moment of profound unease as he surrenders his youthful dignity to a health professional."

In 1957, WCMFA director Bruce Etchison wrote a letter to Curtis Publishing Company art editor Kenneth Stuart asking to purchase one of Rockwell's paintings. In the letter, Etchison wrote $1,100 had been raised so far to purchase one of the paintings but realized they were valued higher. Etchison hoped Rockwell would be compassionate towards a small community's museum considering his works often depicted small-town life. He also had a keen interest in At the Optometrist because the boy in the painting reminded Etchison of his son. A week after sending the letter, Etchison received a response from Rockwell. In it he wrote: "Your museum sounds just the sort of place where I would like to be represented. Although I get kind of fat prices for my work, I would be glad to sell you the Post Cover painting showing the boy being fitted for eye glasses. (Mr. Stuart said this was the one you were interested in)." He also accepted a price of $1,000, despite Etchison offering to pay an additional $100, and sent an original cover of the Post issue and the glasses worn by the model. After the purchase, the museum first displayed the painting in June 1957. It has since become one of the museum's most popular works.

At the Optometrist has frequently been included in Rockwell exhibits at other museums, including the Norman Rockwell Museum, the Peninsula Fine Arts Center, and the Middlebury College Museum of Art. It has also been featured in exhibitions at the WCMFA, including one in 2016 which celebrated the painting's 60th anniversary and partnered with the Norman Rockwell Museum. The exhibition featured black and white photos taken by Henry W. Scovill II of the set created for At the Optometrist and other objects related to the painting. During the WCMFA's 90th anniversary in 2021, the painting was restored, including cleaning, varnishing, glazing, and filling in missing pieces of paint.
