= Boy with Baby Carriage =

1916 painting by Norman Rockwell

- Mother's Day Off
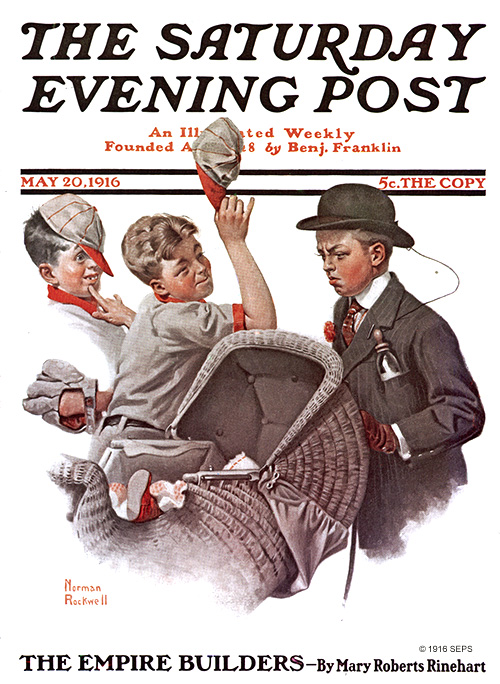
- Artist: Norman Rockwell
- Year: 1916
- Medium: oil on canvas
- Dimensions: 52.7 cm × 47.31 cm (20.75 in × 18.625 in)
- Location: Norman Rockwell Museum, Stockbridge, Massachusetts, U.S.

Boy with Baby Carriage, also known as Mother's Day Off, is an oil on canvas painting by American artist Norman Rockwell. It depicts a boy pushing his younger sibling in a stroller as two of his friends mock him. The painting was illustrated on the cover of The Saturday Evening Post in 1916, the first of over 300 cover illustrations by Rockwell for the magazine. It combines recurring themes Rockwell used in his works for the Post: children, humor, and Americana. The themes of coming of age and perceived feminization are also explored in the painting. Boy with Baby Carriage was included in a list of the 25 most influential magazine covers by The New York Times. To mark the 100th anniversary of the painting's appearance in the Post, the Norman Rockwell Museum hosted a series of events and exhibitions.

== Description ==
Boy with Baby Carriage, also known as Mother's Day Off, is an oil on canvas painting depicting two boys mocking another boy who is pushing his sibling in a stroller. The boy pushing the wicker stroller is wearing a suit, tie, and bowler hat attached to his lapel, and a baby bottle is tucked into his suit pocket. The colors of the bootee and bonnet imply the boy's sibling is a girl. The other boys are his friends who are on their way to play baseball. They are wearing uniforms and are mocking him for having to babysit, with one boy tipping his hat as he would for a woman. The painting measures 20.75 inches (52.7 cm) by 18.625 inches (47.31 cm) and is on display at the Norman Rockwell Museum in Stockbridge, Massachusetts, U.S.

== History ==
=== Background ===
Norman Rockwell was an American painter and illustrator whose early works were of children for Boys' Life magazine, now known as Scout Life, and advertisements for various companies. Despite his early success, Rockwell was unsatisfied with his career and wanted his work seen by a wider audience. He shared an art studio with illustrator Clyde Forsythe who worked for The Saturday Evening Post and asked him for advice. Forsythe suggested he submit paintings of children to the Post, but Rockwell was unsure if the editors of such a popular magazine would accept his work. At the age of 22, he nervously submitted five paintings and Post editor George Horace Lorimer purchased two of them. Rockwell was also asked for three additional paintings. He later recalled thinking "Wow! A cover on the Post! I had arrived."

Rockwell's first illustration for the Post was Boy with Baby Carriage, appearing on the magazine's cover on May 20, 1916, and he was paid $75 for his work. For the painting Rockwell's neighbor, Billy Payne, was used as a model for all three boys. Payne became Rockwell's favorite child model and the boy appeared on 14 additional Post covers during the following three years.

Boy with Baby Carriage was well received by Post readers, and Rockwell's illustrations increased magazine sales. Between 1916 and 1963, Rockwell's work appeared on covers of the Post 322 times and he became the magazine's most celebrated illustrator, surpassing the popularity of longtime Post artist J. C. Leyendecker. Some of his best known covers for the Post include the Four Freedoms series, Saying Grace, and the Willie Gillis series. In addition to the Post covers, Rockwell's other well known works include The Problem We All Live With and Murder in Mississippi, painted during the civil rights movement.

=== Legacy ===
The painting is considered "quintessentially Rockwell" as it includes three themes seen throughout decades of his work: children, humor, and Americana. In addition to the humor intended in the painting, the themes of coming of age and feminization are explored by having two boys mocking another boy performing a supposed feminine task. It was one of Rockwell's many works that related to "masculine anxiety", a frequent topic at the time. According to the Norman Rockwell Museum, this anxiety "was prompted by a series of social, cultural, and economic shifts that challenged traditional masculine authority. The closing of the frontier, the women's movement, and the growth of urban, corporate life, for example, were perceived as threats to patriarchal power."

An article by The New York Times included Boy with Baby Carriage in a list of the "25 most influential magazine covers of all time" that "set the Rockwellian tone, evolving the look of magazines and, arguably, America's imagination of itself." Art critic and journalist Deborah Solomon described the painting as one of Rockwell's "most psychologically intense works". Art critic Christopher Knight wrote the painting makes him "wince", noting the boy pushing a stroller is depicted as a "sissy" and the important themes of addressing questions around masculinity and femininity are hindered by its sterile placement on a commercial magazine cover. Abigail Rockwell has said the boy pushing the stroller is "fully realized and rendered, but the other two boys are poorly done", and thinks her grandfather should have used different models instead of Payne posing for all three.

In honor of the 100th anniversary of Boy with Baby Carriage, the Norman Rockwell Museum hosted a series of events and exhibitions in 2016. This included a sculpture exhibition called "Build a Better Baby Carriage" which included eight works inspired by the painting. The works included Junk Yard Baby Buggie, constructed of hub caps, license plates, and other items, and To Ginger The New Nani, which depicted a giant panda and giraffe in a stroller.
