= The Runaway (painting) =

1958 painting by Norman Rockwell

- Artist: Norman Rockwell
- Year: 1958
- Medium: oil on canvas
- Location: Norman Rockwell Museum, Stockbridge, Massachusetts, U.S.

The Runaway is an oil on canvas painting by American artist Norman Rockwell. The painting depicts a young, nervous boy sitting inside a diner next to a police officer as an employee stands behind the counter. The boy is a runaway whose hobo stick lies on the floor behind him. An illustration of the painting appeared on the cover of The Saturday Evening Post in November 1958. It was one of over 300 illustrations by Rockwell that appeared in the magazine between 1916 and 1963. The man modeling as the police officer, Richard Clemens, was one of Rockwell's neighbors in Stockbridge, Massachusetts. The boy who modeled for the painting, Edward Locke, also appeared in another Rockwell work, Before the Shot.

Clemens and Locke became lifelong friends and frequently reunited for events celebrating The Runaway, considered one of Rockwell's most famous and beloved paintings. Copies of the painting can be found in police stations and diners throughout the United States, and a replica of the diner setting is at the Massachusetts State Police Museum. The Runaway is housed in the Norman Rockwell Museum in Stockbridge and was the second painting by Rockwell focusing on a child leaving home. There have been parodies of the painting, including ones used to draw attention to the militarization of police.

== Description ==
The Runaway is an oil on canvas painting by American artist Norman Rockwell depicting a young runaway boy sitting at a non-descript diner counter next to a police officer wearing a blue uniform and hat. One of the boy's shoes is untied and his feet are dangling. He appears nervous while looking at the officer who is looking at him in a friendly manner. A grinning employee is standing in front of them with a towel draped over his shoulder. A red hobo stick with a handkerchief, the only sign the child is a runaway, is lying on the floor behind the boy. The officer and employee are listening to the boy's story. To their right a coffee cup sits on the counter, possibly indicating a previous customer spoke with the boy and contacted the police. Behind the employee is a list of daily specials written on a blackboard. The combination of the police officer, smiling employee, and previous customer demonstrates members of the community caring for the troubled child. The painting is located in the Norman Rockwell Museum in Stockbridge, Massachusetts.

== History ==
=== Origin ===
Rockwell was a painter and illustrator whose work was featured in The Saturday Evening Post 322 times between 1916 and 1963. Some of his most famous works include the Four Freedoms series, the Willie Gillis series, Rosie the Riveter, and Saying Grace. After leaving the Post, Rockwell painted The Problem We All Live With and Murder in Mississippi during the civil rights movement. Rockwell lived in Stockbridge, Massachusetts, during the 1950s and would often ask locals to pose as models for his paintings, in addition to family and friends. He would often base his paintings on a photographed setting that was decorated and fitted with props. The models would be told what to wear and coached throughout the sitting. For The Runaway, Rockwell chose the Howard Johnson's diner in Pittsfield, one of three restaurants used as inspiration for the painting. The others are believed to be Joe's Diner in Lee and a diner in Housatonic. The Runaway is the second Rockwell painting related to the theme of a child leaving home. The first, Runaway Boy and Clown, is a painting of a young boy who attempted to join a circus and is being comforted by a clown. It appeared on the cover of LIFE magazine in June 1922.

Norman Rockwell used staged photographs to create The Runaway. Richard Clemens is on the left and Edward Locke is on the right.

The police officer used as a model for The Runaway was Richard Clemens. He was born in 1928 and moved to Stockbridge in 1944. Before joining the Massachusetts State Police (MSP), Clemens served in the Marine Corps during the Korean War and worked as a police officer in Virginia. The same year he posed for The Runaway, Clemens was named Massachusetts State Trooper of the Year for his efforts in an arson case where he ran into a burning building and sustained injuries. Clemens lived three houses down from Rockwell and the two men knew each other. Rockwell called Clemens and asked him to pose for a painting wearing his uniform. After Clemens asked permission from MSP authorities, he agreed to the request. According to Clemens, "I was told to be in my uniform at the Howard Johnson's [restaurant] in Pittsfield." Clemens said he felt honored to have been asked to pose for the painting, noting Rockwell had a talent for depicting scenes that may not be realistic, but hopeful and ideal.

The boy used as a model in the painting was Edward Locke who was eight years old at the time. Rockwell visited the Stockbridge Plain School and walked around the building with the principal, looking for a model. Locke was sitting in the lunchroom when Rockwell saw him, pointed, and said "that one." Locke thought he was in trouble but soon discovered the reasoning behind Rockwell's visit. He was told to go home and change clothes before going to the Howard Johnson's. The man who posed as the diner employee was a local garage employee and one of Rockwell's friends, Clarence Barrett. In the painting Barrett was replaced with Don Johnson, Rockwell's assistant.

Clemens already knew Locke's father and brother. He and the young boy posed for photographs taken by Louis Lamone for around an hour as Rockwell gave them instructions. According to Locke, "I was a little kid, but [Rockwell] made it easy on me." Afterwards, Rockwell bought Locke an ice cream cone and he returned to school. Locke also posed for Before the Shot, another one of Rockwell's paintings that was a Post cover illustration in 1958. Any reference to Howard Johnson's was removed in the painting. When Clemens asked why, Rockwell said he "wanted a more rural look, to suggest the kid had gotten a little further out of town." The Runaway illustration appeared on the cover of the Post on September 20, 1958. As a thank you to Clemens, Rockwell painted a portrait of him in 1961 that was reproduced as a Christmas card by the MSP.

=== Legacy ===
The Runaway has become one of Rockwell's most famous and beloved paintings. Copies of it are found in many police stations and diners throughout the United States, and a copy is displayed at the Massachusetts State Police Museum in addition to a replica of the diner counter and stools where visitors can pose for photos. It has been described as a "quintessential image of small-town life", one where a "runaway and the hero who brought him home [are] frozen in time." Journalist Ryan Kost wrote in The Boston Globe: "Sometimes a picture becomes more than a frozen moment. Sometimes a picture stretches and spills beyond its physical boundaries and into some sort of shared experience...[It] takes you by the arm and pulls you to the diner, to a place that only a few have been but millions remember."

Clemens continued working for the MSP until retiring in 1975 and worked in corporate security for General Electric until 1994. Locke went through a self-described rebellious phase during his high school years and later dropped out of college. He became a handyman and reunited with Clemens when both began taking night classes at Berkshire Community College. The two became lifelong friends and appeared as their painting characters for a Japanese commercial filmed in Stockbridge. They would frequently reunite for events celebrating The Runaway until Clemens’ death in 2012, including recreating the scene at Joe's Diner in 1988. They also reunited for a 50th anniversary gathering in 2008 at the MSP headquarters in Framingham.

At the anniversary gathering, MSP superintendent Mark F. Delaney described the painting as iconic, and State Police Association of Massachusetts president Rick Brown and Commissioned Officers Association president Dean Bennett also spoke fondly of The Runaway, noting its symbolism and popularity with police officers. State Senator James E. Timilty said the painting captured the essence of small towns in New England. He awarded Clemens and Locke citations from the Massachusetts House of Representatives and Massachusetts Senate, and both also received citations from Governor Deval Patrick.

Following the Ferguson unrest in 2014, artist Anthony Freda created a digital work to draw attention to the militarization of police. Using the original painting, Freda covered the police officer's outfit with a bulletproof vest and riot helmet, and a semi-automatic firearm is depicted resting by his foot. The boy's race was changed to Black and he appears frightened. The following year MAD magazine also created a parody of The Runaway with the police officer wearing riot gear and a gas mask, and his semi-automatic firearm has a scope. The diner employee as well as the Black child appear frightened. The magazine reposted it in 2017 following President Donald Trump's decision to give surplus military equipment to local police departments, a government program that had been limited by President Barack Obama.
