= The Norman Rockwell Code =

- Directed by: Alfred Thomas Catalfo
- Written by: Alfred Thomas Catalfo
- Produced by: Alfred Thomas Catalfo; Marc A. Dole
- Starring: Mike Walsh; Danica Carlson; Alfred Thomas Catalfo; Tom Seiler
- Cinematography: Kristian Bernier
- Edited by: Brian Vawter
- Release date: 2006
- Running time: 33 minutes
- Country: United States
- Language: English

The Norman Rockwell Code is a 2006 parody of the 2003 Dan Brown novel The Da Vinci Code and the 2006 film of the same name. The plot is ridiculously exaggerated in an attempt to mock the Da Vinci Code. The movie was listed on the June 2, 2006 issue of Entertainment Weekly's "The Must List."

== Plot ==
The plot centers around the murder of the curator of the Norman Rockwell Museum in Stockbridge, Massachusetts. The police call in Professor Langford Fife (a pastiche of both Robert Langdon from the book and Barney Fife from The Andy Griffith Show), a professor of symbology at a local community college, to help them solve the mystery. As the curator was dying, he put on a pair of rubber overalls. He held a lemon in one hand and a can of Chicken of the Sea in the other. He called the police as he was dying and told them that Mr. Fife could decode the message.

Mr. Fife meets Sopha Poisson during the course of his investigation. She informs him that the murdered curator was her grandfather. Together they work to decode a series of messages hidden in the paintings of Norman Rockwell, leading to a shocking discovery: Sopha is a mermaid. The movie ends with Mr. Fife taking her to the sea.

== Cast ==
- Mike Walsh as Langford
- Danica Carlson as Sopha
- Fritz Wetherbee as the Curator
- Gregory G. Athans as the Gatekeeper
- Ralph Napolitano as Skipper
- Alfred Thomas Catalfo as the Detective
- Tom Seiler as the Police Captain
- Christopher Roblee as the Actor

== Production ==
The film was directed and produced by Alfred Thomas Catalfo, who also wrote and starred. It had a budget of approximately $5,000. As the 2006 film was at the time unreleased, Catalfo based the script on the novel under the assumption that the Howard production would closely follow the book's plot. Filming began in February 2006 in Kittery and York in Maine, as well as Dover, New Hampshire, and wrapped on March 19 of the same year.

== Release ==
The Norman Rockwell Code was released online on May 19, 2006 in order to coincide with the film release of The Da Vinci Code. It later received a screening on June 25 of the same year at the Norman Rockwell Museum. The museum had discovered the spoof via a Google alert, prompting them to request a copy of the film. It would also screen at the Norman Rockwell Weekend in Kennebunk, Maine in 2008.
