= Dugout =

Dugout may refer to:

- Dugout (shelter), an underground shelter
- Dugout (boat), a logboat
- Dugout (smoking), a marijuana container

== Sports ==
- In bat-and-ball sports, a dugout is one of two areas where players of the home or opposing teams sit when not at bat or in the field
  - Dugout (baseball), a covered shelter near the diamond
  - Dugout (cricket), an area at either end of the field
- In association football, the technical area contains the dugouts

== In popular culture ==
- The Dugout, 1948 painting by Norman Rockwell
- Dug Out, the seventh album by the Japanese band The Blue Hearts
