= Walking to Church =

Painting by Norman Rockwell

- Artist: Norman Rockwell
- Year: 1952
- Medium: Oil on canvas
- Dimensions: 47.6 cm × 45.1 cm (18.75 in × 17.75 in)
- Location: Private collection

Walking to Church is a 1952 painting by the American painter Norman Rockwell, painted for the cover of The Saturday Evening Post's April 4, 1953, issue.

The painting depicts a husband and wife with their three children walking to church through a city street.

Walking to Church had been on a long-term loan at the Norman Rockwell Museum before its 2013 sale.

== 2013 sale ==
Walking to Church sold for $3.2 million (including a buyer's premium) at the auctioneers Sotheby's in New York in December 2013.

Two other Rockwell paintings that had been loaned to the Norman Rockwell Museum were sold alongside Walking to Church; Saying Grace and The Gossips. The three paintings, along with four other art works by Rockwell, were sold by the descendants of Kenneth J. Stuart, the art director of The Saturday Evening Post. The sale of the art works was initiated after the conclusion of a legal disagreement between Stuart's sons. A long term colleague of Rockwell's, Stuart had been given the paintings by Rockwell as a gift. Walking to Church had hung in the bedroom of Stuart's wife, Katherine. Stuart's sons could no longer afford the insurance and upkeep of the paintings by the time of their 2013 sale.

Upon Stuart's death in 1993 his estate was divided equally between his three sons, Ken Jr., William and Jonathan. The oldest brother, Ken Jr., was subsequently sued by William and Jonathan, who claimed that he had forced their father to sign papers so could gain control of his fortune. They additionally claimed that Ken Jr. had used the assets of his father's estate for his own expenses. The three brothers settled out of court before the sale. The owner of The Saturday Evening Post, Curtis Publishing, who retain reproduction rights to Rockwell's artworks, also unsuccessfully attempted to claim ownership of the paintings.

The director of the Norman Rockwell Museum, Laurie Norton Moffatt, has expressed her hope that the paintings will eventually be reunited with the museum. Moffatt said of the paintings that "We cared for them like children ... We hope they come back some day. We believe that's where they belong." Moffatt said that the loss of the paintings left an "irreplaceable hole in the museum's collection."
