= So You Want to See the President! =

1943 painting by Norman Rockwell

- Artist: Norman Rockwell
- Year: 1943
- Medium: mixed media on paper
- Location: The People's House: A White House Experience, Washington, D.C.

So You Want to See the President! is an artwork by American illustrator and painter Norman Rockwell. He sketched and painted the four-panel set in 1943 as a gift for Stephen Early, the White House Press Secretary for President Franklin D. Roosevelt. The artwork depicts visitors in the West Wing of the White House during World War II waiting to see the president, including members of the press, military personnel, and a Miss America winner, in addition to Secret Service agents. There are also sketches of White House staff members, press photographers, and Roosevelt. Rockwell's original sketches were destroyed in a fire, and he was allowed to return and redo them over a four-day period. The illustrations appeared in The Saturday Evening Post in November 1943. Early hung the originals in his office and later gifted them to his daughter, Helen.

In 1978, Helen lent the artwork to the White House and So You Want to See the President! was displayed in the West Wing during seven presidential administrations. After one of Helen's brothers saw the artwork in the background of a television interview in 2017, he and other relatives filed a lawsuit claiming part-ownership. During this ownership dispute, So You Want to See the President! was removed from the White House art collection and returned to Helen's son, William Elam, who had inherited it in 1999. A judge ruled in Elam's favor, and he chose to sell the artwork. The nonprofit White House Historical Association purchased it in 2025 for $7.25 million and placed it in an exhibition at The People's House: A White House Experience museum.

== Description ==
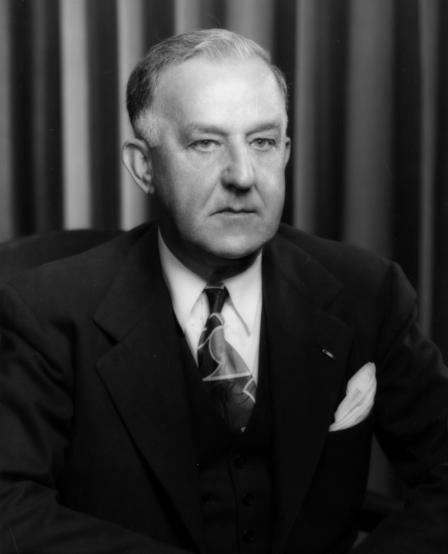
So You Want to See the President! was a gift for White House Press Secretary Stephen Early.

So You Want to See the President! is a four-panel set of black-and-white sketches and watercolor paintings by American artist Norman Rockwell. The work was intended to capture a typical day in the West Wing of the White House during World War II. The people depicted in the artwork include those sitting on red leather furniture waiting to see President Franklin D. Roosevelt, in addition to White House staff members, members of the press, and Secret Service agents. Each panel measures approximately 28 by 21 inches (71 cm × 53 cm). In addition to labels written on each panel describing what is depicted, "So You Want / to See the President! / sketched / by / Norman Rockwell" is written on the upper lefthand side of panel one, "To Steve Early / in gratitude for / his great kindness / Norman Rockwell" is inscribed on a card on the lower lefthand side of panel one, and "N/R" is written on panel four.

The first panel includes drawings of a guard standing at the White House entrance ("Entrance Gate"), news photographers waiting outside the West Wing entrance on West Executive Avenue ("camera men / wait"), and Press Secretary Stephen Early speaking with journalists ("Steve Early talks with the Press"), with Early facing the viewer. The painting on this panel depicts members of the press ("Gentlemen of the Press") sitting on a couch while reading newspapers. The man casually sitting in a chair is Rockwell smoking a pipe.

The second panel features drawings of two Secret Service agents and a carved mahogany table with coats and hats on it ("Famous White House Table / and S.S. men"), a coatrack with a gas mask ("President's / gas mask"), journalists running towards telephone booths to report their news stories ("the Press get a news Flash"), and journalists surrounding Rockwell ("A Hero is interviewed"). The painting depicts a Secret Service agent ("S.S.") monitoring the people seated on a couch waiting to see the president: a Scottish military personnel member wearing a kilt ("Scottish Officer") and Miss America wearing a yellow dress and sash sitting beside her publicist ("Beauty and Publicity man").

In the third panel there are drawings of a coatrack with a variety of hats, including fedoras, a top hat, and military hats, ("the Visitors' Hatrack"), a piece of White House stationery ("President's list / of appointments"), Roosevelt's dog Fala following a White House staff member delivering the president's lunch ("the President's Lunch"), and Generals Joseph Stilwell and Edwin M. Watson shaking hands while being photographed by a journalist ("Generals / Stillwell and Watson"). The paintings depict Senators Tom Connally of Texas and Warren Austin of Vermont conversating on the other end of the couch ("Senators Connally and Austin"), and another Secret Service agent ("S.S.") standing beside a WAVES (Women Accepted for Volunteer Emergency Service) officer seated in a chair ("a Wave").

The last panel includes drawings of Secret Service agents huddling ("Secret Service"), various White House staff members ("Secretaries / everywhere"), a man sitting beside a desk where a White House staff member speaks to another person ("you present your final credentials"), and General Watson opening the door to the Oval Office where a glimpse of Roosevelt can be seen ("and now – the President!"). The painting depicts officials from the Army, Marine Corps, and Navy huddled on a couch and chair ("Army, Marines and Navy").

== History ==
=== Origin ===
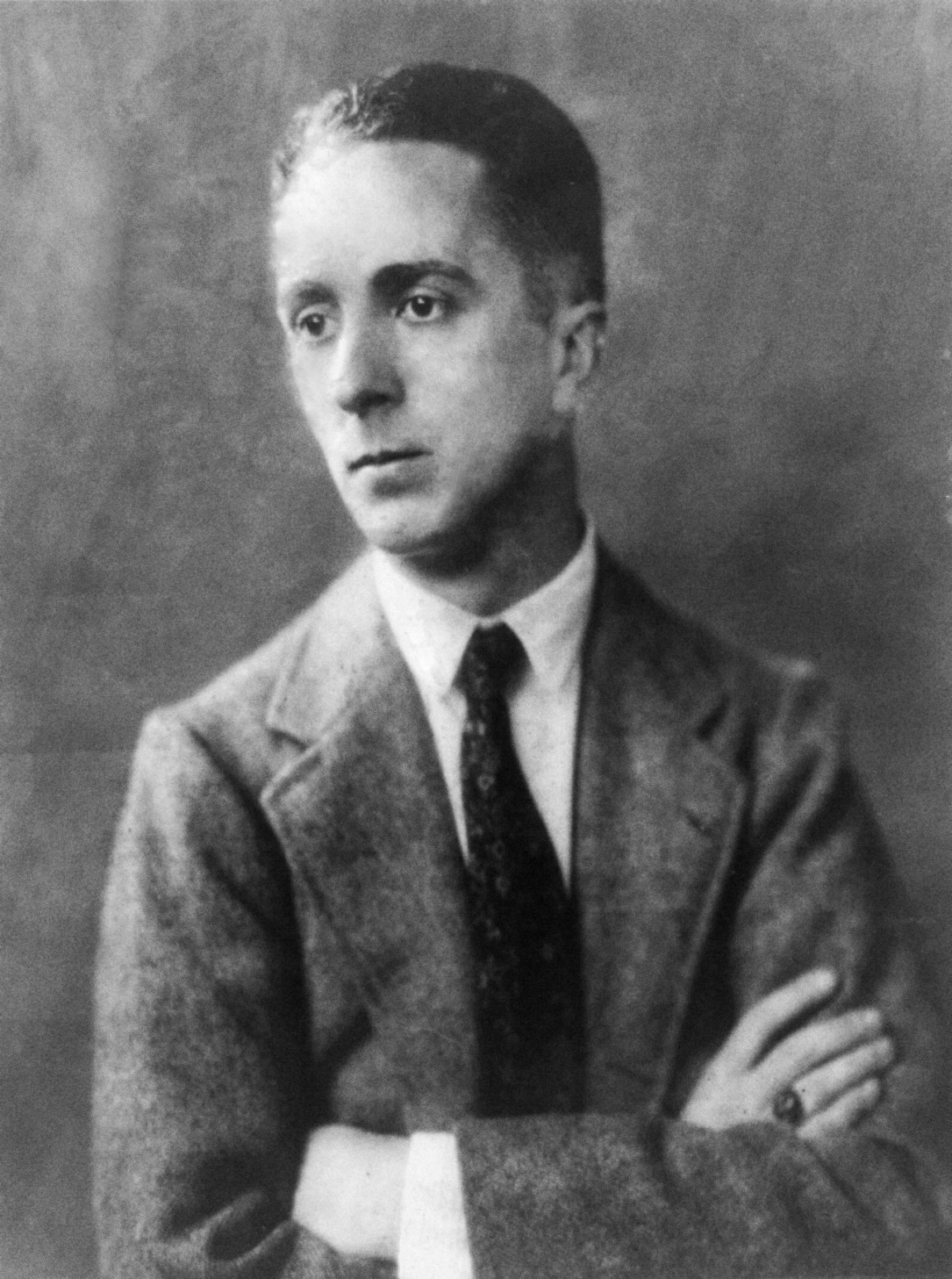
Norman Rockwell sketched and painted So You Want to See the President! in 1943.

Between 1916 and 1963, Rockwell created 322 illustrations for The Saturday Evening Post. Soon after painting his Four Freedoms series during the height of World War II, Rockwell was invited by Roosevelt's trusted press secretary and advisor to photograph and sketch the various people that visited the West Wing. Early's goal was to "humanize executive power" by showing Roosevelt being accessible so that the average American could better relate to what took place at the White House. Rockwell visited the White House in early 1943 and sketched the subjects, but these sketches and other works were destroyed in May 1943 when his studio in Vermont caught on fire. Rockwell wrote a letter to White House officials asking "Might I come back and do it again?" and he was invited back to sketch for four days, often spending time in the Diplomatic Reception Room.

The fact a gas mask and members of the military are depicted demonstrates the wartime setting, but including Miss America gives a semblance of normalcy. According to Laurie Norton Moffatt of the Norman Rockwell Museum, the work shows Rockwell "trying to find lightness and humor in very serious situations." Rockwell was not allowed to sketch the Secret Service agents due to security reasons, so he used some of his neighbors in Vermont as models. So You Want to See the President! was given to Early as a gift from Rockwell and it hung in his West Wing office. Early wrote a thank you letter to Rockwell stating: "I am as proud of these original sketches of yours as Churchill was of the R.A.F", referencing Winston Churchill and the Royal Air Force. The illustrations appeared in The Saturday Evening Post on November 13, 1943, pages 9-12.

=== Disputed ownership ===
When Early died in 1951, he did not have a will. His daughter, Helen, had reportedly received the artwork as a gift from her father after graduating from the Pratt Institute in 1949. Helen hung the artwork in her dining room where it remained for many years. According to Helen's son, William Elam, he flung SpaghettiOs at the image of Miss America when he was a child. After the death of her mother in 1978, Helen lent the illustrations to the White House art collection during President Jimmy Carter's administration, on the condition they be returned upon request. The artwork was displayed in the lower press hallway until the George W. Bush administration when it was moved to a hallway outside the Roosevelt Room.

In 2017, Helen's brother, Thomas Early, was watching a television interview of President Donald Trump when he noticed the artwork hanging on a wall in the background. According to Thomas, he and his brother, also named Stephen Early, owned two-thirds of the artwork. Thomas wrote a letter to the White House Office of the Curator inquiring why the artwork was being displayed without his permission. After Stephen died in 2020, Thomas and his sons contacted an attorney and art-crime investigator Robert King Wittman to assist with filing a lawsuit. The lawsuit claimed Helen had instructed her son to "launder" and conceal the valuable artwork by loaning it to the White House. During the ownership dispute, So You Want to See the President! was removed from the White House in 2022 and returned to Elam. Throughout its time at the White House, the artwork had been displayed during seven presidential administrations. One of Rockwell's paintings remains in the collection of the White House. Working on the Statue of Liberty, painted in 1946, was donated by Steven Spielberg in 1994 and President Bill Clinton had it hung in the Oval Office. It is one of several hundred works in the White House art collection.

In addition to asking for part-ownership of So You Want to See the President!, the lawsuit filed by Thomas and the other relatives asked for punitive damages of $350,000. Elam, Helen's son, filed a countersuit claiming sole ownership. Elam said his mother had given him the artwork in 1999 and that he had continued lending it to the White House. Part of Elam's evidence that the artwork had never been laundered or hidden was the fact it had been lent to an art show in 1980, which included promotional literature discussing Helen's ownership. Another piece of evidence Elam used in court was a letter his mother had written to the Norman Rockwell Museum in 1990. According to Elam, "the notion that she lent these works to a building as public as the White House in order to hide them is ridiculously bogus." In 2023, Judge Michael S. Nachmanoff ruled Elam was the sole owner based on the fact Early had never included the artwork in his will, thus it had been a gift to Elam's mother. The ruling was appealed, but in May 2025 a federal appeals court upheld Nachmanoff's ruling. After the legal proceedings, Elam chose to sell the artwork.

=== Auction and exhibition ===
The White House Historical Association (WHHA), a nonprofit organization founded in 1961 by First Lady Jacqueline Kennedy that preserves the integrity of the White House building and educates people about its history, bought So You Want to See the President! at auction in November 2025 for $7.25 million, the highest amount the association has paid for an artwork. As part of the United States Semiquincentennial, the WHHA began exhibiting the artwork at its museum, The People's House: A White House Experience, where it will be displayed until June 2027. It is the "only known collection of four interrelated paintings that [Rockwell] conceived to tell a story." As part of the exhibit, an artificial intelligence company was hired to animate So You Want to See the President! so that the subjects interact with each other on a separate display.

Before it was exhibited, research was done to better understand the subjects captured in the paintings. The WHHA looked at the White House visitor logs during the time of Rockwell's sketches in addition to staff notes, diaries, and Roosevelt's schedule. The two senators visited Roosevelt on February 1, 1943. The WAVES officer who had been visiting the White House on assignment is believed to be Eloise English Davies, one of the first women to serve in the Navy program. Her father was an admiral who had recently died in an airplane crash. Photographs taken by Rockwell show Davies wearing a blue dress, but in the painting she's wearing white. According to Davies' daughter, her father was fighting overseas as a pilot when he saw the image of Davies in The Saturday Evening Post. He became interested in her and contacted Davies when he returned to the U.S., later marrying her. They were together for 46 years until his death in 1991.

There is a discrepancy about the identity of the Miss America subject. The WHHA says it is Rosemary LaPlanche, a redhead who was crowned Miss America in 1941 and assisted with selling war bonds. The children of Marie McIntyre, a Washingtonian who won local beauty pageants, claim it was their mother who modeled as Miss America. McIntyre was 17 at the time and, according to her son, described Rockwell as "business-like" and he "directed the photo shoot; his photographer took the pictures." She also reportedly made her own dress, a print one, not the yellow depicted in the painting. Her hair was also changed from blonde to red. A photograph of McIntyre posing with a man as her publicist is in the collection of the Norman Rockwell Museum.
