= Eye doctor =

Eye doctor is an Eye care professional, and may refer to the following medical specialists:

- Ophthalmologist
- Ophthalmic medical practitioner
- Optometrist

Other uses

- At the Optometrist, a painting also known as Eye Doctor
