= Triple Self-Portrait =

Oil painting

Triple Self-Portrait. Norman Rockwell 1960. Norman Rockwell Museum.

Triple Self-Portrait is an oil painting by American illustrator Norman Rockwell created for the cover of the February 13, 1960, edition of The Saturday Evening Post.

== Description ==
Triple Self-Portrait is an oil painting on canvas measuring 34.5 by 44.5 inches (88 cm × 113 cm). Set in a white void, it depicts a rear-view Rockwell sitting at an easel producing a self-portrait. A gold-framed mirror topped with an eagle is set up to the left on a chair; Rockwell can be seen in its reflection as a thin and bespectacled man. On the chair in front of the mirror sits a glass of Coca-Cola and an open book.

On the canvas in front of the illustrator is an unfinished sketch of himself in his idealized art style. On the right side of the canvas Rockwell pinned self-portraits by Albrecht Dürer, Rembrandt, Vincent van Gogh, and Picasso. A piece of paper with sketches sits on the left. In total, there are seven self-portraits depicted in the work.

== Reception ==
According to Michele Bogart, the painting shows that Rockwell saw himself as split between an artist and an illustrator. According to Deborah Solomon, by not painting his eyes in the reflection, Rockwell shows that he rejects "the popular myth of artists as heroic seers". Further, she sees the work as Rockwell's "manifesto" by depicting the way American Realism is divorced from the reality found in a mirror. Alexander R. Galloway disagrees with Solomon's interpretation and reads the painting as avoiding questions about how artists build meaning instead of answering them.
