= James K. Van Brunt =

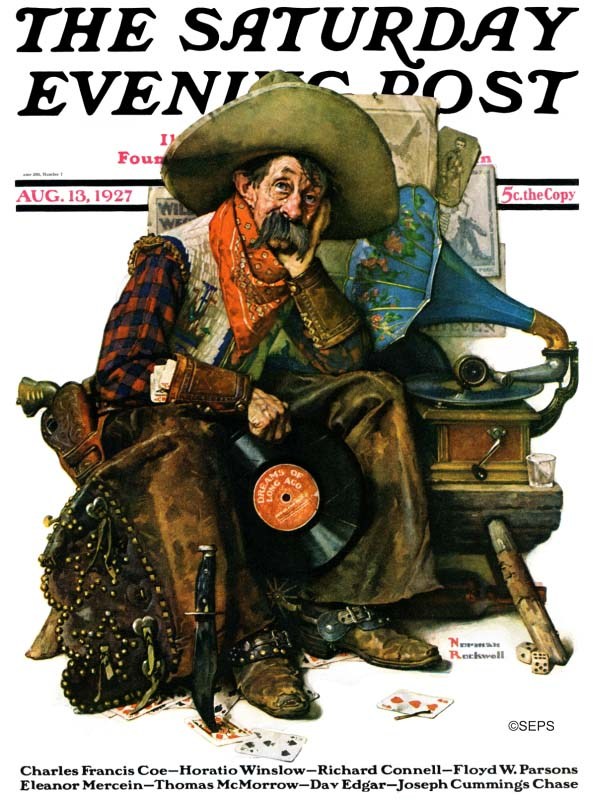
Van Brunt on the August 13, 1927, issue of The Saturday Evening Post

James Kellogg Van Brunt (December 25, 1849 – February 9, 1935) was a model used extensively by illustrator Norman Rockwell during the 1920s. He was also a real estate agent. According to Norman Rockwell and the Saturday Evening Post: The Early Years, by Starkey Flythe, Jr., Van Brunt entered Rockwell's studio, and proclaimed, "James K. Van Brunt, sir. Five feet two inches tall, sir. The exact height of Napoleon Bonaparte." He claimed to be a veteran of the battles of Sharpsburg, Fredericksburg, and the Battle of the Wilderness. He also claimed to have fought in battles against the forces of Crazy Horse and Sitting Bull, and against the Spaniards in Cuba.

Rockwell used Van Brunt as a model so often that the Post editors started complaining.

== Van Brunt's covers ==
The following is a list of The Saturday Evening Post covers for which Van Brunt modeled:

- The Hobo, October 18, 1924
- Crossword Puzzles, January 31, 1925
- The Old Sign Painter, February 6, 1926
  - The first cover after Van Brunt had shaved off his mustache, for which Rockwell paid him $10 to do in order to continue using him as a model
- The Phrenologist, March 27, 1926
- The Bookworm, August 14, 1926
- Dreams of Long Ago, August 13, 1927
  - Van Brunt was a widower, but still apparently mourned for Annabelle, his late wife. Rockwell's painting, Dreams of Long Ago, was a result of Rockwell inadvertently barging in on Van Brunt remembering his trip with Annabelle to the 1893 Columbian Exposition in Chicago.
- Gilding the Eagle, May 26, 1928
- The Wedding March, June 23, 1928
  - This is the next-to-last cover in which Van Brunt appears. According to the book Norman Rockwell and The Saturday Evening Post: The Early Years, he appeared in one more cover, that of January 12, 1929, as three gossiping old ladies.
