= Peter Rockwell =

American sculptor (1936–2020)

Peter Barstow Rockwell
- Born: September 16, 1936; New Rochelle, New York, U.S.
- Died: February 6, 2020 (aged 83); Danvers, Massachusetts, U.S.
- Education: The Putney School; Haverford College; Pennsylvania Academy of the Fine Arts
- Occupation: Sculptor
- Spouse: Cynthia Ide
- Children: 4
- Parent: Norman Rockwell

Peter Rockwell (September 16, 1936 – February 6, 2020) was an American sculptor and the author of several books about stone carving. He was associated with the Norman Rockwell Museum, named for his father.

== Early life ==
Rockwell was born on September 16, 1936, in New Rochelle, New York, the son of Mary Barstow and painter and illustrator Norman Rockwell. Rockwell grew up in Vermont, where he was educated at The Putney School. He graduated from Haverford College in 1958, and he later attended the Pennsylvania Academy of the Fine Arts.

== Career ==
Rockwell became a sculptor in Rome, Italy, where he spent most of his adult life. His father was initially reluctant to see his son pursue sculpture as a profession. Rockwell left Rome after the death of his wife in 2013 and produced sculptures at the Clay Dreaming Pottery Studio in Beverly, Massachusetts. He authored several books about stone carving.

Rockwell was associated with the Norman Rockwell Museum, named for his father, where he exhibited his work. His work was also examined in The Art of Making in Antiquity: Stoneworking in the Roman World, a research project at King's College London.

His sculptures can be seen in the United States at the National Portrait Gallery, the Washington National Cathedral, Haverford College, the Cathedral of the Pines. They are also held in a convent in Chioggia, Italy and at the headquarters of the International Centre for the Study of the Preservation and Restoration of Cultural Property in Rome.

== Personal life and death ==
Rockwell married Cynthia Ide, and they had four children. He died on February 6, 2020, in Danvers, Massachusetts. During the final years of his life, he lived in Beverly, Massachusetts and attended St. Peter's Episcopal Church in Beverly. In 2018, Peter had the Norman Rockwell Museum hang his Stations of the Cross woodcuts in the church for a temporary exhibition during Lent and Easter. The church hosted an opening reception and Peter gave an artist's talk to the assembled crowd. His Memorial Eucharist was held at St. Paul's Within the Walls, the American Episcopal church in Rome on May 4, 2022; the service had been delayed two years by the COVID-19 pandemic. Peter faithfully attended that church during his many years in Rome, even served as Senior Warden, and taught Sunday school to the children. Peter created many sculptures for the church, including a crucifix that hangs in the nave, a series of striking woodcuts of the Stations of the cross, also installed in the nave. Many unique stone sculptures that he created can be seen in the church's garden. At his urging, the church became a place for artists to display their work.

== Selected works ==
=== Books ===
- Rockwell, Peter (1994). The Art of Stoneworking. Cambridge, Massachusetts: Cambridge University Press. ISBN 978-0521413329. OCLC 851064901.
- Rockwell, Peter; Rosenfeld, Stanley; Hanley, Heather (2004). The Compleat Marble Sleuth. Sunny Isles Beach, Florida: Rockrose. ISBN 978-0974794600. OCLC 646062312.
- Dehejia, Vidya; Rockwell, Peter (2016). The Unfinished: Stone Carvers at Work on the Indian Subcontinent. New Delhi, India: Lustre Press. ISBN 9789351941149. OCLC 936543987.
