= Jarvis Rockwell =

American artist (1931–2026)

Jarvis Waring Rockwell (September 3, 1931 – April 25, 2026) was an American artist. He died from a stroke on April 25, 2026, at the age of 94. He was the son of Norman Rockwell.
