= Children Dancing at a Party =

1918 painting by Norman Rockwell

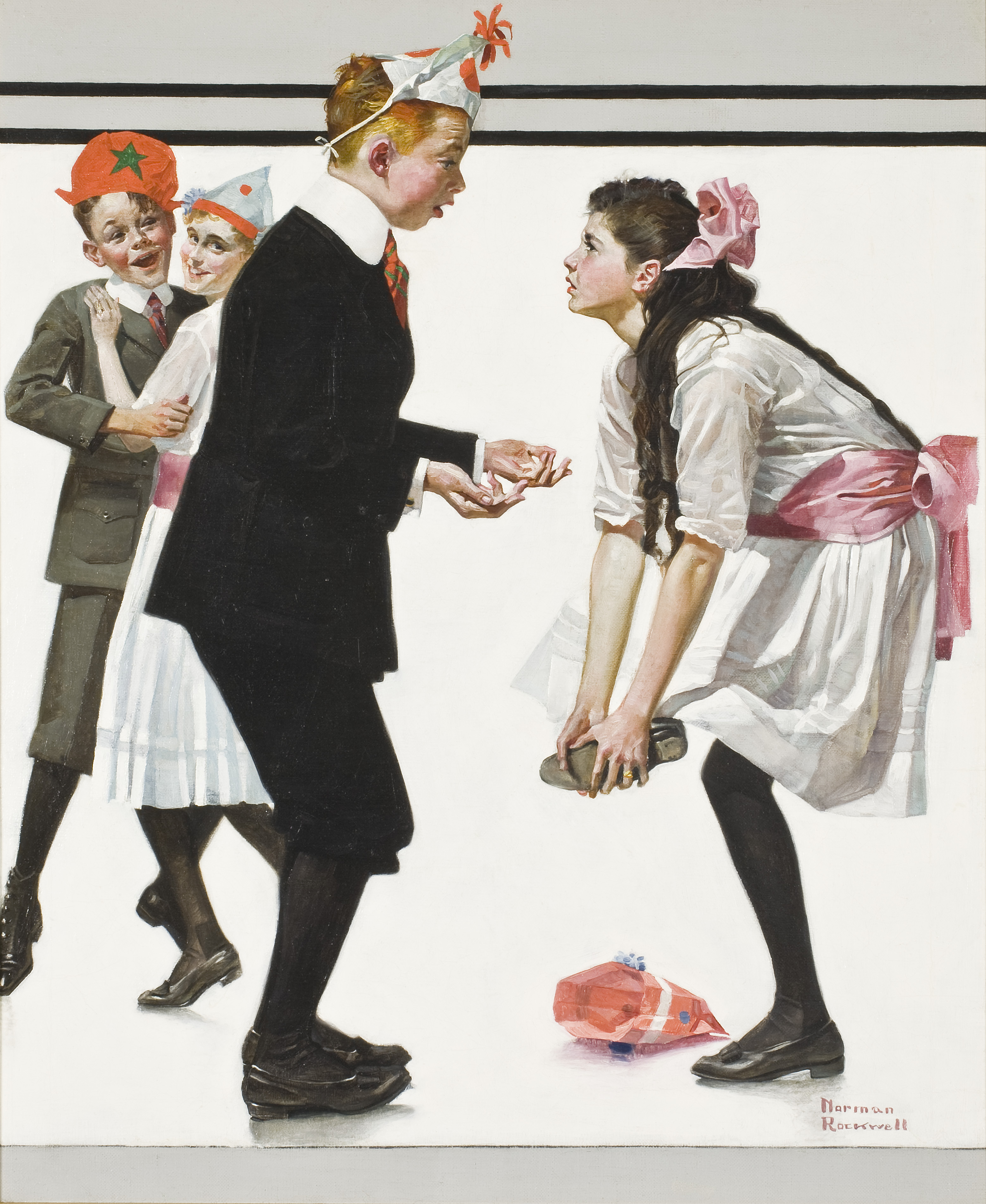
- Artist: Norman Rockwell
- Year: 1918
- Medium: Oil on canvas
- Dimensions: 58 cm × 48 cm (23 in × 19 in)
- Location: National Museum of American Illustration

Children Dancing at a Party, produced by Norman Rockwell, was used as the cover for the January 26, 1918 issue of The Saturday Evening Post. This painting has also been called Boy Stepping on Girl's Toe and Pardon Me. The original painting, oil on canvas measuring 23x19 inches, is in the collection of the National Museum of American Illustration.

== Background ==
The painting shows a humorous but embarrassing situation in which a boy has accidentally stepped on a girl's foot while dancing. The girl is holding her foot and looking at the boy with an expression that appears to be asking "Why did you do that?". The boy looks to be trying to apologize, holding his hands, palms up, towards the girl. His red cheeks show his embarrassment at the situation. There is a second couple dancing in the background who appear to be amused by the scene unfolding in front of them. There is a formal feel with the clothes that the children are dressed in.
