= The Dugout =

1948 painting by Norman Rockwell

The Dugout (Bottom of the Ninth)
- Artist: Norman Rockwell
- Year: 1948
- Medium: Oil on canvas
- Location: Art Institute of Chicago

The Dugout (Bottom of the Ninth) is a 1948 oil painting by American artist Norman Rockwell, painted to create the September 4, 1948, cover of The Saturday Evening Post magazine. The painting depicts dejected members of the Chicago Cubs baseball team during a game against the Boston Braves at Braves Field.

The cover became one of Rockwell's best-known baseball-themed works and came to symbolize the Cubs' "lovable loser" image.

== Composition ==
A batboy stands just outside the visitor's dugout, in which are four members of the 1948 Chicago Cubs: pitcher Bob Rush, left, manager Charlie Grimm, catcher Rube Walker, and pitcher Johnny Schmitz.

Two rows of Braves fans are depicted above the dugout; they include two women with connections to personnel of the 1948 Boston Braves: Helen Fitzsimmons, daughter of Braves' coach Freddie Fitzsimmons, and Terese Prendergast, wife of Braves' pitcher Jim Prendergast.

== Background ==
Before a doubleheader at Braves Field between the Boston Braves and the Chicago Cubs on May 23, 1948, Rockwell approached both teams with the intention of creating a portrait of a visiting team's dejection in contrast to the elation of hometown fans.

A number of Cubs players and manager Charlie Grimm agreed to pose in the dugout to be photographed. As spectators filled the stands, Rockwell picked a number of them and instructed them to mimic expressions of delight or scorn. A batboy for the Braves, Frank McNulty, had to be convinced to pose in a Cubs jersey in front of the dugout. Rockwell paid McNulty $5, equivalent to $67 in 2025.

The Cubs went on to lose both games of the doubleheader.

Rockwell posed the subjects for photographs, and used the photographs to create character studies in charcoal. Then he created the large oil painting composition, before painting a small, detailed watercolor which was reproduced in color lithograph to use for the magazine cover.

== Provenance ==
In December 2025, the early oil study painting was acquired by the Art Institute of Chicago as part of a gift by Bruce Rauner, an investor and former governor of Illinois. It was installed on February 9, 2026, in a gallery of the museum's "Arts of the Americas" wing, where it hangs alongside other iconic artworks of mid-20th-century America, such as Grant Wood's American Gothic and Edward Hopper's Nighthawks.
