= Norman Rockwell =

American painter and illustrator (1894–1978)

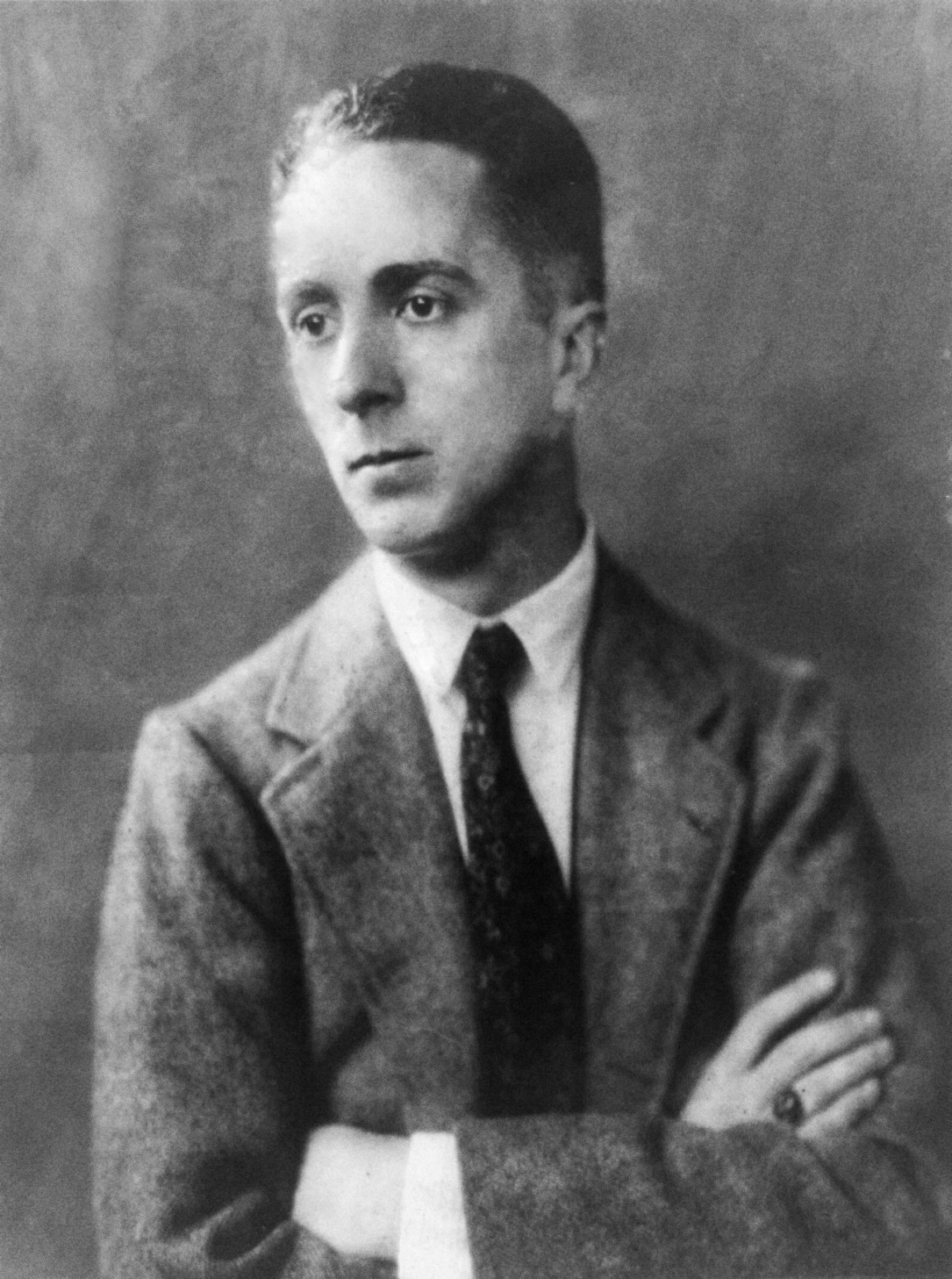
- Rockwell in 1921
- Born: Norman Percevel Rockwell; February 3, 1894; New York City, U.S.
- Died: November 8, 1978 (aged 84); Stockbridge, Massachusetts, U.S.
- Education: Chase Art School; National Academy of Design; Art Students League
- Known for: Painting; Illustration
- Notable work: Willie Gillis; Rosie the Riveter; The Four Freedoms; The Problem We All Live With
- Spouse: Irene O'Connor (m. 1916; div. 1930) Mary Barstow (m. 1930; died 1959) Mary Leete "Mollie" Punderson (m. 1961)
- Children: Jarvis, Peter, and Thomas
- Awards: Presidential Medal of Freedom

Norman Percevel Rockwell (February 3, 1894 – November 8, 1978) was an American painter and illustrator. His works have a broad popular appeal in the United States for their reflection of the country's culture. Rockwell is most famous for the cover illustrations of everyday life he created for The Saturday Evening Post magazine over nearly five decades. Among the best-known of Rockwell's works are the Willie Gillis series, Rosie the Riveter, the Four Freedoms series, Saying Grace, and The Problem We All Live With. He is also noted for his 64-year relationship with the Boy Scouts of America (BSA), during which he produced covers for their publication Boys' Life (now Scout Life), calendars, and other illustrations. These works include popular images that reflect the Scout Oath and Scout Law such as The Scoutmaster, A Scout Is Reverent, and A Guiding Hand.

Rockwell was a prolific artist, producing more than 4,000 original works in his lifetime. Most of his surviving works are in public collections. Rockwell was also commissioned to illustrate more than 40 books, including Tom Sawyer and Huckleberry Finn and to paint portraits of presidents Eisenhower, Kennedy, Johnson, and Nixon, as well as those of foreign figures, including Gamal Abdel Nasser and Jawaharlal Nehru. His portrait subjects also included Judy Garland. One of his last portraits was of Colonel Sanders in 1973. His annual contributions for the Boy Scouts calendars between 1925 and 1976 were only slightly overshadowed by his most popular of calendar works: the "Four Seasons" illustrations for Brown & Bigelow that were published for 17 years beginning in 1947 and reproduced in various styles and sizes since 1964. He created artwork for advertisements for Coca-Cola, Jell-O, General Motors, Scott Tissue, and other companies. Illustrations for booklets, catalogs, posters (particularly movie promotions), sheet music, stamps, playing cards, and murals (including "Yankee Doodle Dandy" and "God Bless the Hills", which was completed in 1936 for the Nassau Inn in Princeton, New Jersey) rounded out Rockwell's oeuvre as an illustrator.

Rockwell's work was dismissed by serious art critics in his lifetime. Many of his works appear overly sweet in the opinion of modern critics, especially The Saturday Evening Post covers, which tend toward idealistic or sentimentalized portrayals of American life. This has led to the often deprecatory adjective "Rockwellesque". Consequently, Rockwell is not considered a "serious painter" by some contemporary artists, who regard his work as bourgeois and kitsch. He is called an "illustrator" instead of an artist by some critics, a designation he did not mind, as that was what he called himself.

In his later years, Rockwell began receiving more attention as a painter when he chose more serious subjects such as the series on racism for Look magazine. One example of this more serious work is The Problem We All Live With, which dealt with the issue of school racial integration. The painting depicts Ruby Bridges, flanked by white federal marshals, walking to school past a wall defaced by racist graffiti. This 1964 painting was displayed in the White House when Bridges met with President Barack Obama in 2011.

== Life ==
=== Early years ===
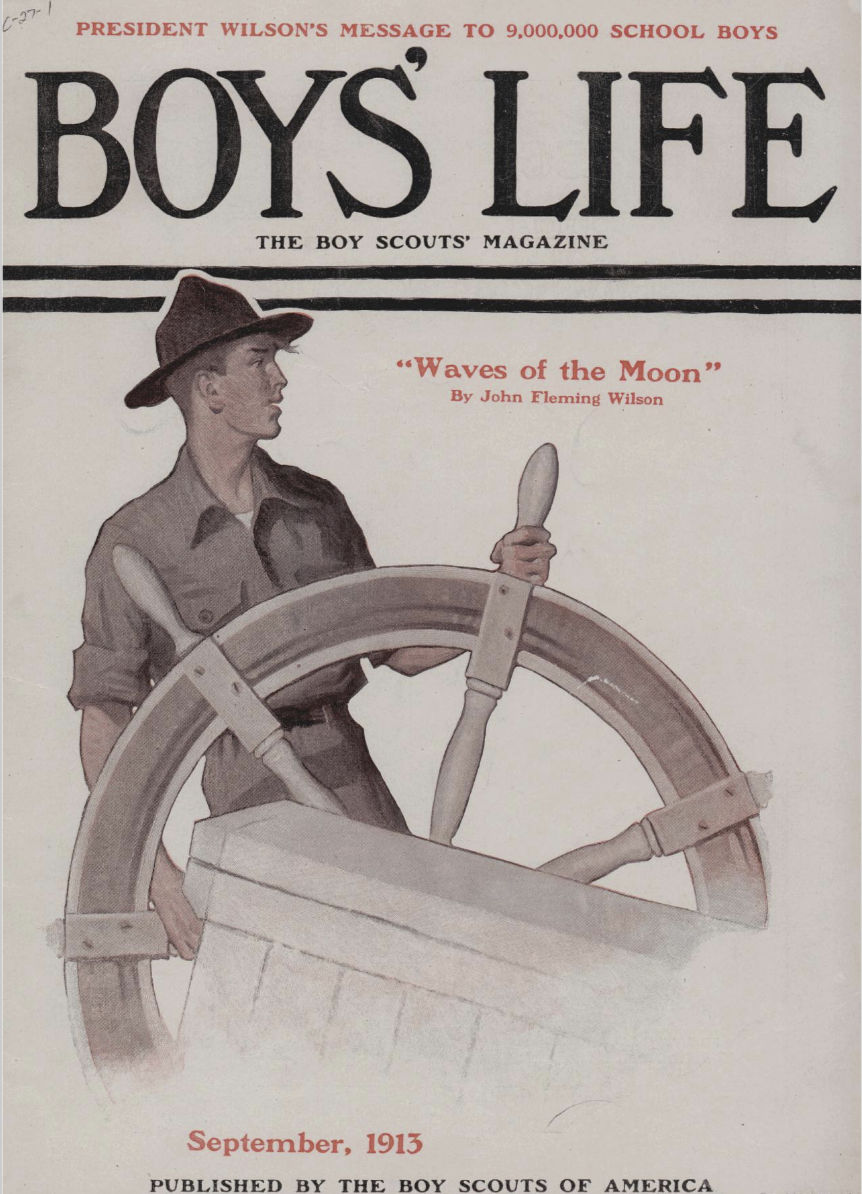
Scout at Ship's Wheel, 1913

Norman Rockwell was born on February 3, 1894, in Harlem in New York City, to Jarvis Waring Rockwell and Anne Mary "Nancy" (née Hill) Rockwell, and lived at 789 St. Nicholas Avenue in Sugar Hill, Manhattan. His father was a Presbyterian and his mother was an Episcopalian; two years after their engagement, he converted to the Episcopal faith. Rockwell's earliest American ancestor was John Rockwell (1588–1662), from Somerset, England, who immigrated to colonial North America, probably in 1635, aboard the ship Hopewell and became one of the first settlers of Windsor, Connecticut. Rockwell had one brother, Jarvis Jr., older by a year and a half. Jarvis Sr. was the manager of the New York office of a Philadelphia textile firm, George Wood, Sons & Company, where he spent his entire career.

Rockwell transferred from high school to the Chase Art School (later Parsons School of Design) at the age of 14. He then went on to the National Academy of Design and finally to the Art Students League of New York. There, Rockwell was taught by Thomas Fogarty, George Bridgman, and Frank Vincent DuMond; his early works were produced for St. Nicholas Magazine, the Boy Scouts of America (BSA) magazine Boys' Life, and other youth publications. As a student, Rockwell had some small jobs, including one as a supernumerary at the Metropolitan Opera. His first major artistic job came at age 18, illustrating Carl H. Claudy's book Tell Me Why: Stories about Mother Nature.

After that, Rockwell was hired as a staff artist for Boys' Life. In this role, he received 50 dollars' compensation each month for one completed cover and a set of story illustrations. It is said to have been his first paying job as an artist. At 19, Rockwell became the art editor for Boys' Life, published by the Boy Scouts of America. He held the job for three years, during which Rockwell painted several covers, beginning with his first published magazine cover, Scout at Ship's Wheel, which appeared on the Boys' Life September 1913 edition.

=== Association with The Saturday Evening Post ===
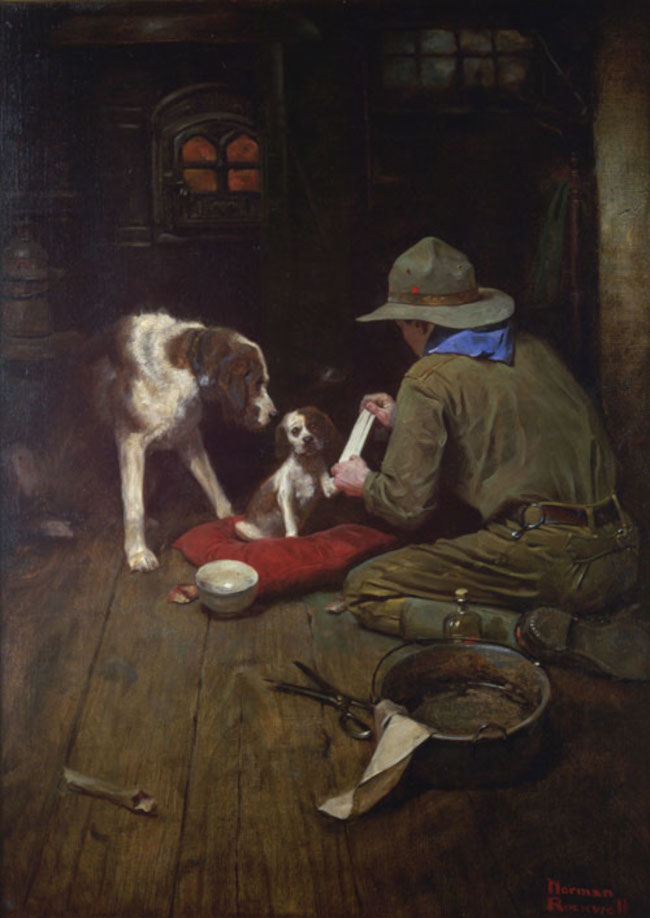
Rockwell's first Scouting calendar, 1925

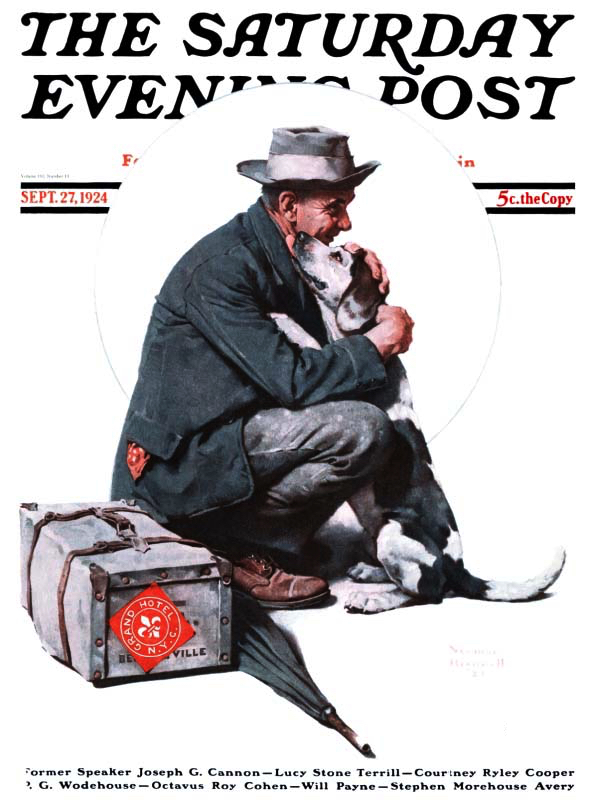
Saturday Evening Post cover (September 27, 1924)

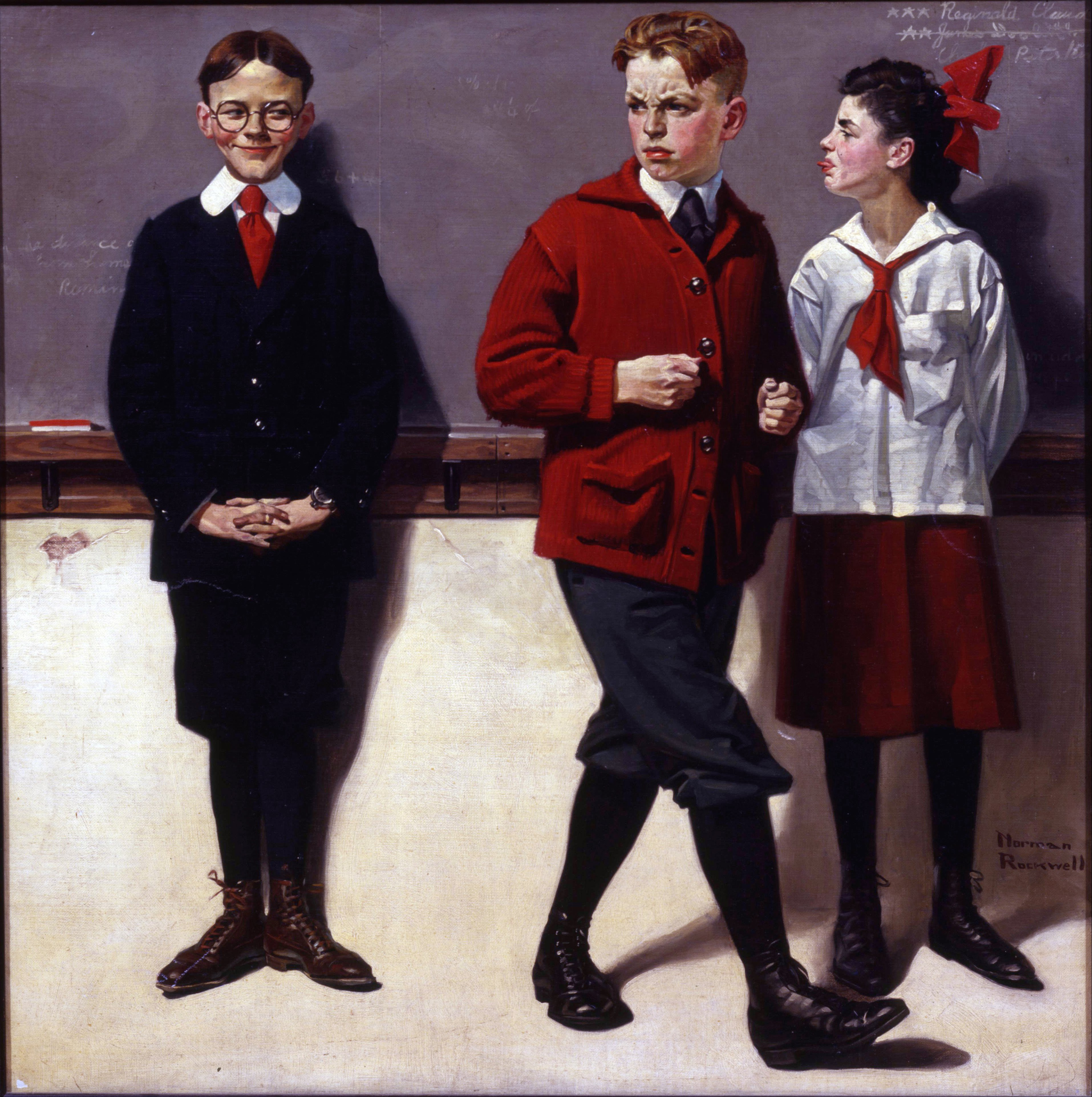
Cousin Reginald Spells Peloponnesus. Norman Rockwell, 1918.

Rockwell's family moved to New Rochelle, New York, when Norman was 21 years old. There he shared a studio with the cartoonist Clyde Forsythe, who worked for The Saturday Evening Post. With Forsythe's help, Rockwell submitted his first successful cover painting to the Post in 1916, Boy with Baby Carriage (published on May 20). He followed that success with Circus Barker and Strongman (published on June 3), Gramps at the Plate (August 5), Redhead Loves Hatty Perkins (September 16), People in a Theatre Balcony (October 14), and Man Playing Santa (December 9). Rockwell was published eight times on the Post cover within the first year. Ultimately, Rockwell published 322 original covers for The Saturday Evening Post over 47 years. His Sharp Harmony appeared on the cover of the issue dated September 26, 1936; it depicts a barber and three clients, enjoying an a cappella song. The image was adopted by SPEBSQSA in its promotion of the art.

Rockwell's success on the cover of the Post led to covers for other magazines of the day, most notably the Literary Digest, the Country Gentleman, Leslie's Weekly, Judge, Peoples Popular Monthly and Life magazine.

When Rockwell's tenure began with The Saturday Evening Post in 1916, he left his salaried position at Boys' Life, but continued to include scouts in Post cover images and the monthly magazine of the American Red Cross. He resumed work with the Boy Scouts of America in 1926 with production of his first of fifty-one original illustrations for the official Boy Scouts of America annual calendar, which still may be seen in the Norman Rockwell Art Gallery at the National Scouting Museum in Cimarron, New Mexico.

During World War I, he tried to enlist into the U.S. Navy but was refused entry because, at 140 pounds (64 kg), he was eight pounds underweight for someone 6 feet (1.8 m) tall. To compensate, he spent one night gorging himself on bananas, liquids and doughnuts, and weighed enough to enlist the next day. He was given the role of a military artist, however, and did not see any action during his tour of duty.

=== World War II ===
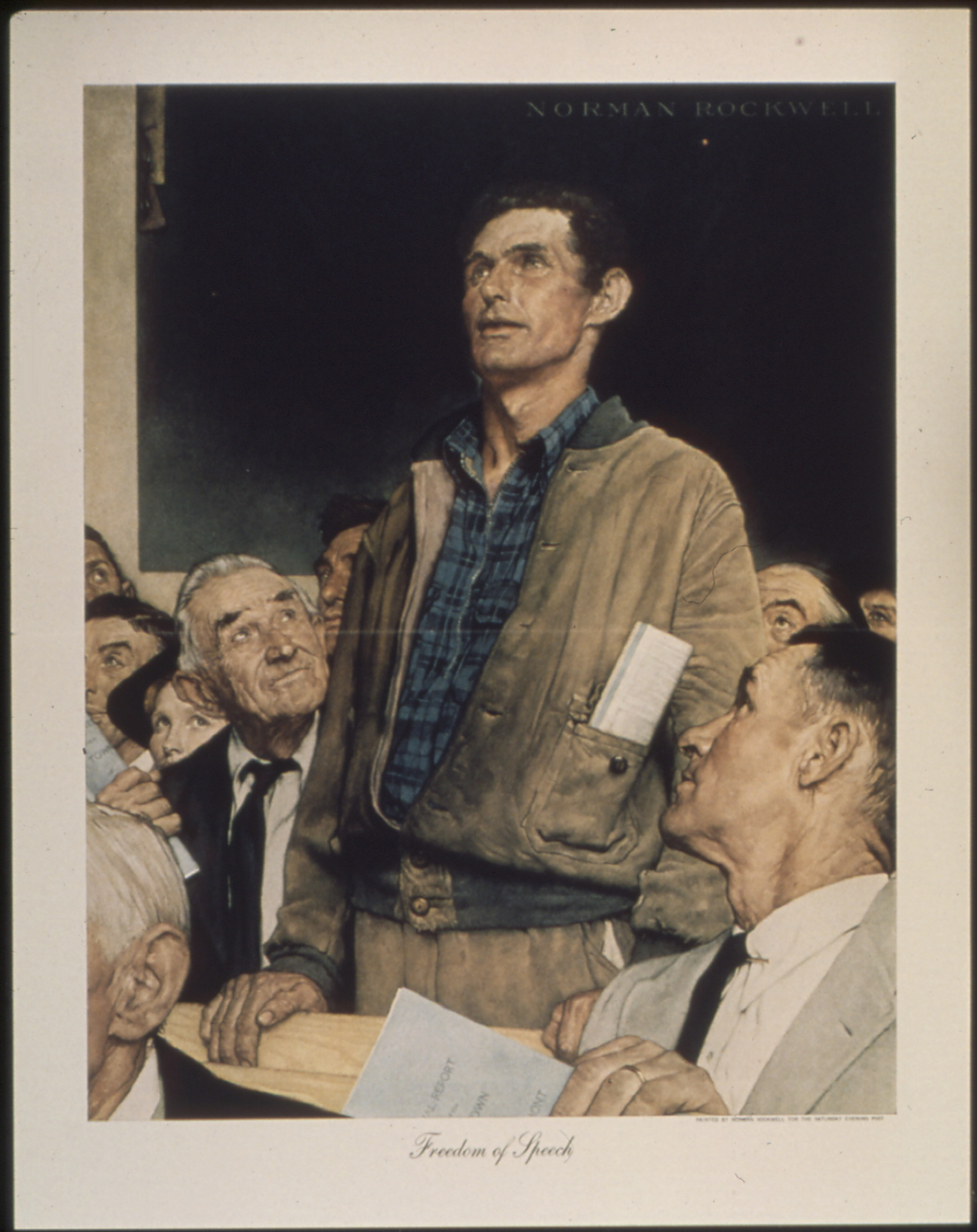
Freedom of Speech, 1943

In 1943, during World War II, Rockwell painted the Four Freedoms series, which was completed in seven months and resulted in him losing fifteen pounds. The series was inspired by a speech by Franklin D. Roosevelt, wherein Roosevelt described and articulated Four Freedoms for universal rights. Rockwell then painted Freedom from Want, Freedom of Speech, Freedom of Worship and Freedom from Fear.

The paintings were published in 1943 by The Saturday Evening Post. Rockwell used the Pennell shipbuilding family from Brunswick, Maine as models for two of the paintings, Freedom from Want and A Thankful Mother, and would combine models from photographs and his own vision to create his idealistic paintings. Freedom from Want included details that reference The Last Supper by Leonardo da Vinci. Two characters that Norman Rockwell used in his covers were Billy Payne and his friend Eddie Carson who lived in the same apartment complex as Norman. The United States Department of the Treasury later promoted war bonds by exhibiting the originals in sixteen cities. Rockwell considered Freedom of Speech to be the best of the four.

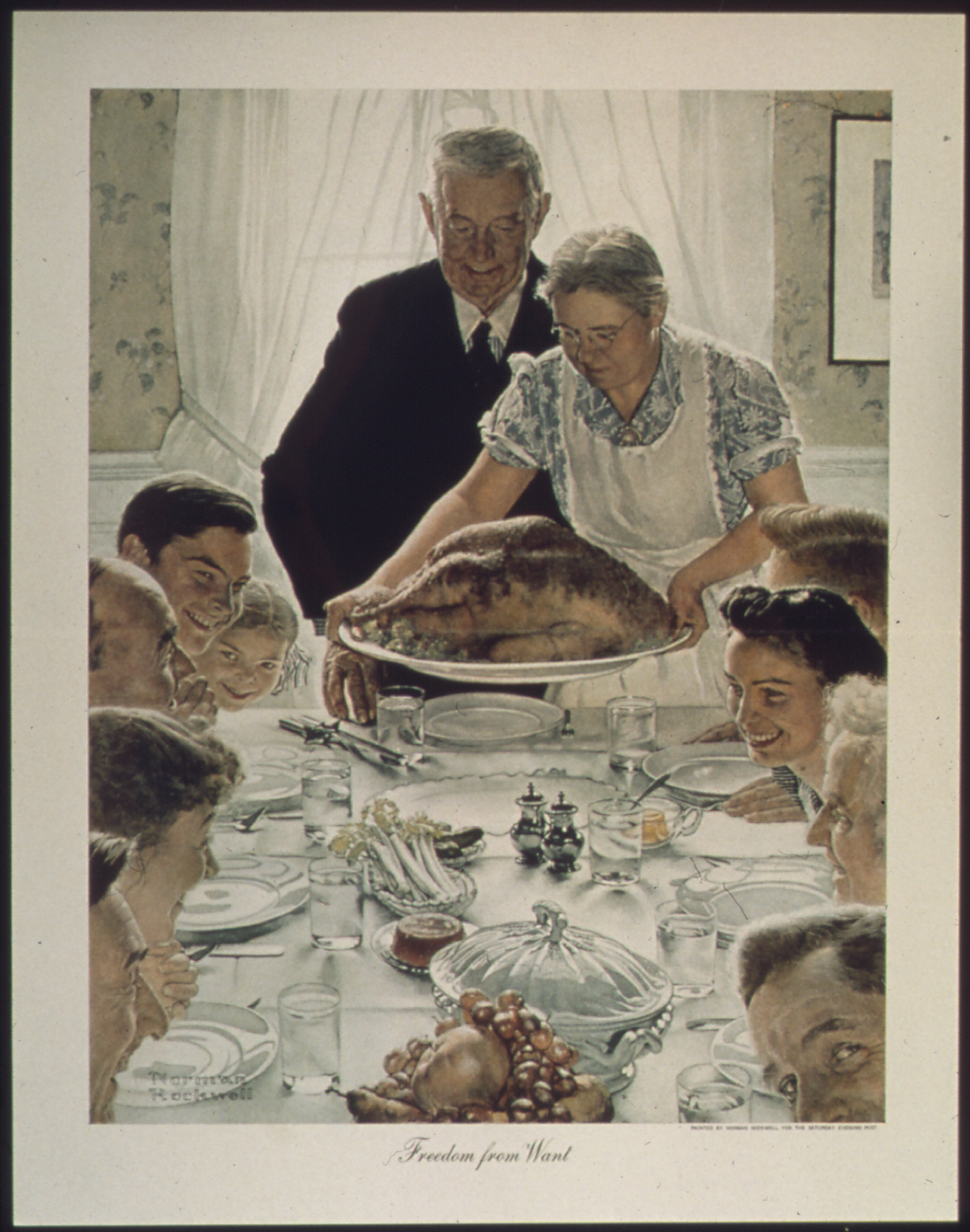
Freedom from Want, 1943

That same year, a fire in his studio destroyed numerous original paintings, costumes, and props. Because the period costumes and props were irreplaceable, the fire split his career into two phases, the second phase depicting modern characters and situations. Rockwell was contacted by writer Elliott Caplin, brother of cartoonist Al Capp, with the suggestion that the three of them should make a daily comic strip together, with Caplin and his brother writing and Rockwell drawing. King Features Syndicate is reported to have promised a $1,000 per week deal, knowing that a Capp–Rockwell collaboration would gain strong public interest. The project was ultimately aborted, however, as it turned out that Rockwell, known for his perfectionism as an artist, could not deliver material so quickly as would be required of him for a daily comic strip.

=== Later career ===
During the late 1940s, Norman Rockwell spent the winter months as artist-in-residence at Otis College of Art and Design. Occasionally, students were models for his Saturday Evening Post covers. In 1949, Rockwell donated an original Post cover, April Fool, to be raffled off in a library fund raiser.

In 1959, after his wife Mary died suddenly from a heart attack, Rockwell took time off from his work to grieve. It was during that break that he and his son Thomas produced Rockwell's autobiography, My Adventures as an Illustrator, which was published in 1960. The Post printed excerpts from this book in eight consecutive issues, the first containing Rockwell's famous Triple Self-Portrait.

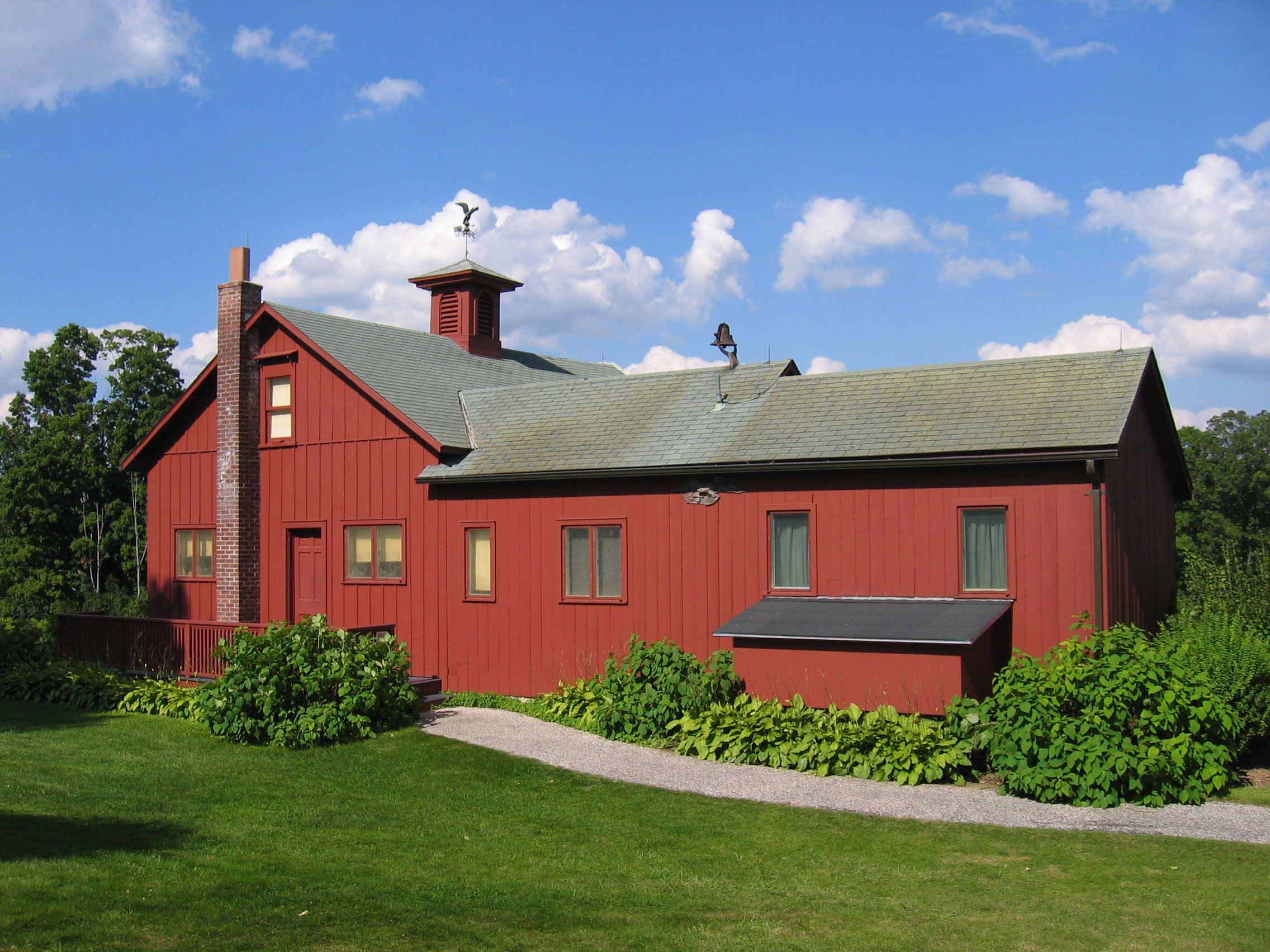
Norman Rockwell's studio in Stockbridge, Massachusetts

Rockwell's last painting for the Post was published in 1963, marking the end of 47 years of a publishing relationship that had included 322 cover paintings. He spent the next 10 years painting for Look magazine, where his work depicted his interests in civil rights, poverty, and space exploration.

In 1966, Rockwell was invited to Hollywood to paint portraits of the stars of the film Stagecoach, and also found himself appearing as an extra in the film, playing a "mangy old gambler".

In 1968, Rockwell was commissioned to do an album cover portrait of Mike Bloomfield and Al Kooper for their record, The Live Adventures of Mike Bloomfield and Al Kooper.

As a tribute on the 75th anniversary of Rockwell's birth, officials of Brown & Bigelow and the Boy Scouts of America asked Rockwell to pose in Beyond the Easel as the illustration for the 1969 Boy Scout calendar.

In 1969, the U. S. Bureau of Reclamation commissioned Rockwell to paint the Glen Canyon Dam.

His last commission for the Boy Scouts of America was a calendar illustration titled The Spirit of 1976, which was completed when Rockwell was 82, concluding a partnership which generated 471 images for periodicals, guidebooks, calendars, and promotional materials. His connection to the BSA spanned 64 years, marking the longest professional association of his career. His legacy and style for the BSA has been carried on by Joseph Csatari.

For "vivid and affectionate portraits of our country", Rockwell was awarded the Presidential Medal of Freedom, the United States of America's highest civilian honor, in 1977 by President Gerald Ford. Rockwell's son, Jarvis, accepted the award.

==== Death ====
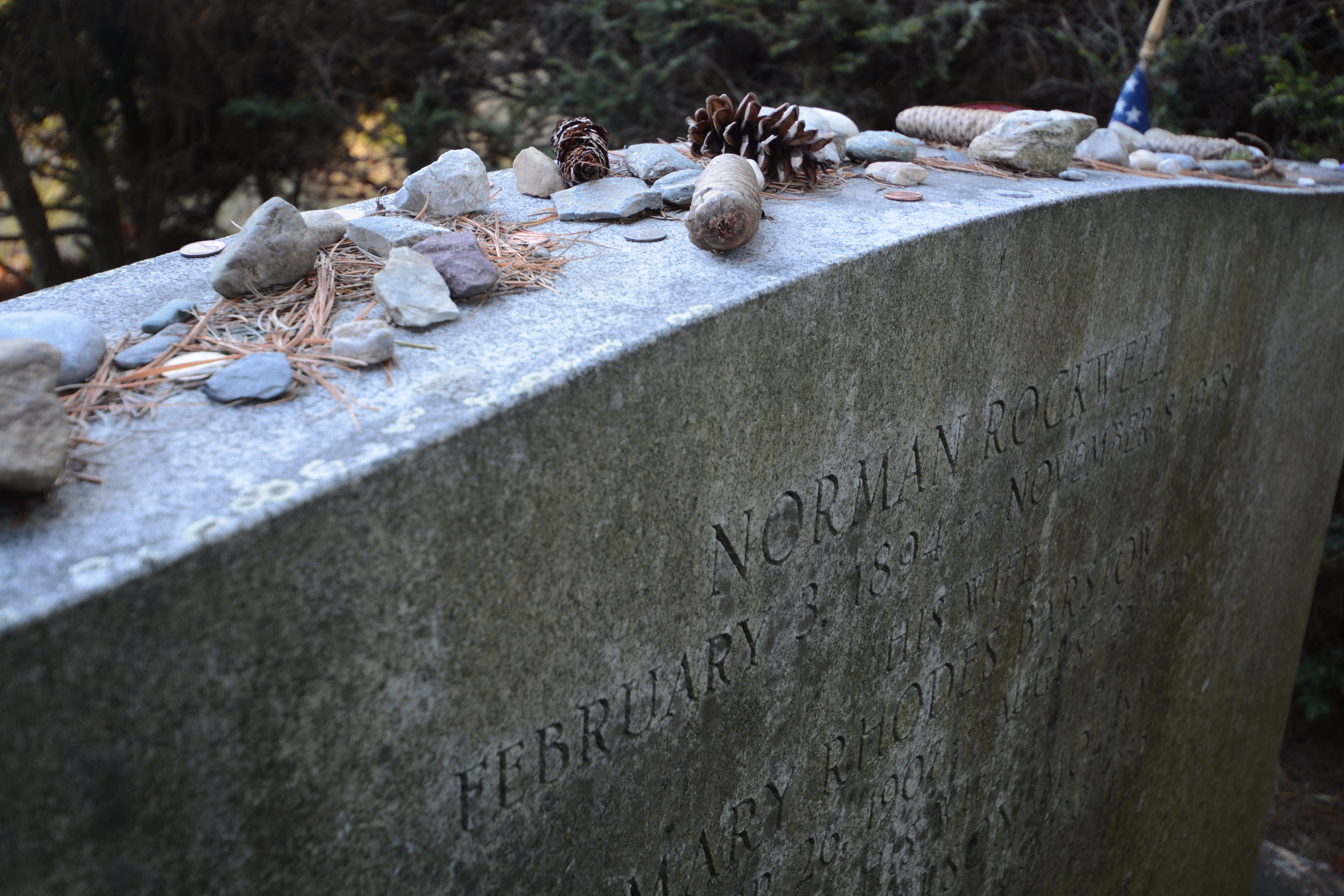
Rockwell's grave in Stockbridge Cemetery

Rockwell, a heavy smoker, died on November 8, 1978, of emphysema at the age of 84 in his Stockbridge, Massachusetts, home. First Lady Rosalynn Carter attended Rockwell's funeral.

== Personal life ==
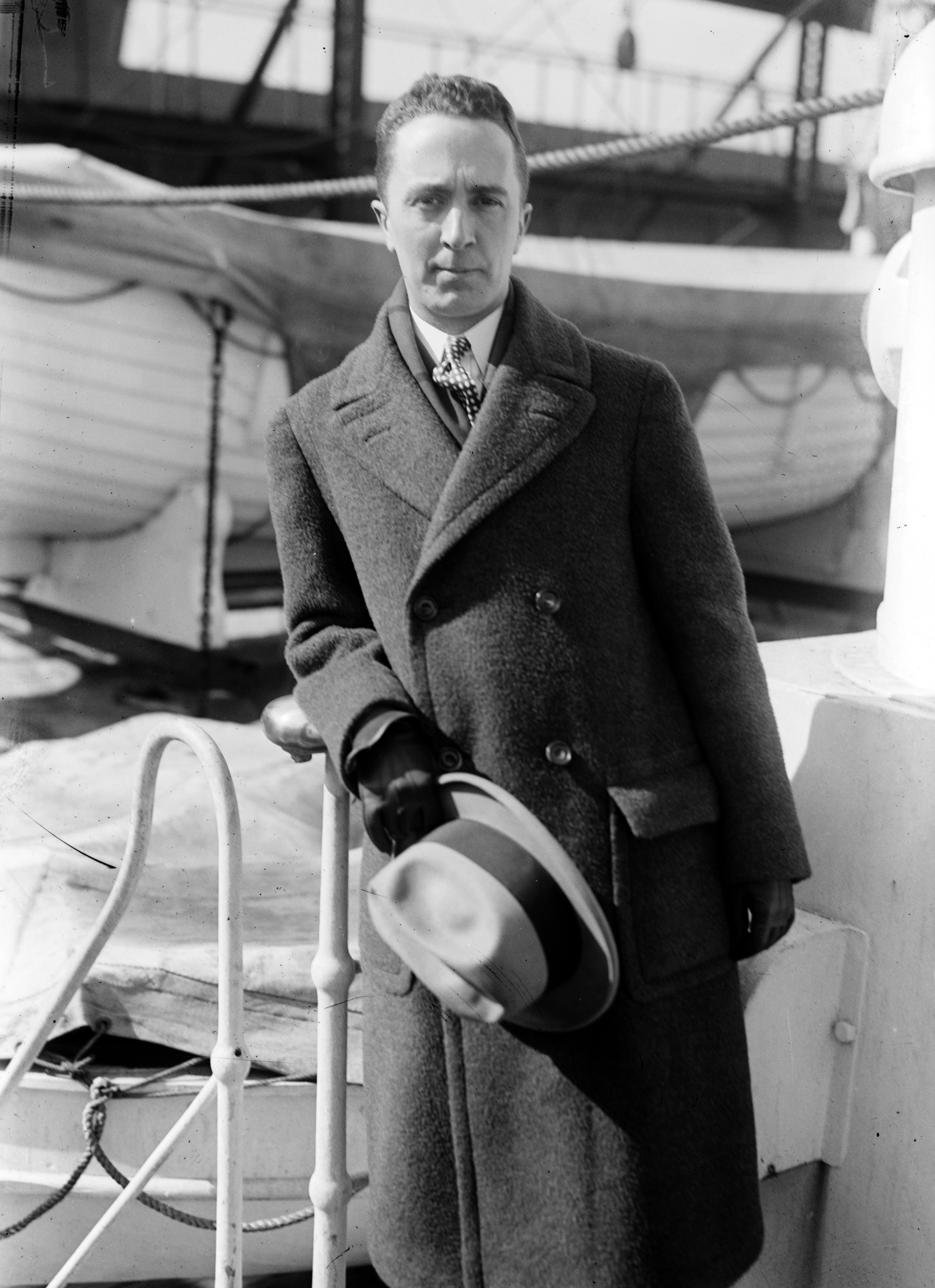
Rockwell c. 1920–1925

Rockwell married his first wife, Irene O'Connor, on July 1, 1916. O'Connor was Rockwell's model in Mother Tucking Children into Bed, published on the cover of The Literary Digest on January 19, 1921. The couple divorced on January 13, 1930.

Depressed, Rockwell moved briefly to Alhambra, California, as a guest of his old friend Clyde Forsythe. There, Rockwell painted some of his best-known paintings, including The Doctor and the Doll. While there, he met schoolteacher Mary Barstow; they married on April 17, 1930. The couple returned to New York shortly after their marriage. They had three sons: Jarvis, Thomas, and Peter. The family lived at 24 Lord Kitchener Road in the Bonnie Crest neighborhood of New Rochelle, New York.

Rockwell and his wife were not regular church attendees, although they were members of St. John's Wilmot Church, an Episcopal church near their home, and their sons were baptized there. Rockwell moved to Arlington, Vermont, in 1939 where his work began to reflect small-town life. He would later be joined by his good friend John Carlton Atherton.

In 1953, the Rockwell family moved to Stockbridge, Massachusetts, so that his wife could be treated at the Austen Riggs Center, a psychiatric hospital at 25 Main Street, close to where Rockwell set up his studio. Rockwell also received psychiatric treatment, seeing the analyst Erik Erikson, who was on staff at Riggs. Erikson told biographer Laura Claridge that Rockwell painted his happiness, but did not live it. On August 25, 1959, Mary died unexpectedly of a heart attack.

Rockwell married his third wife, retired Milton Academy English teacher Mary Leete "Mollie" Punderson (1896–1985), on October 25, 1961. His Stockbridge studio was located on the second floor of a row of buildings. Directly underneath Rockwell's studio was, for a time in 1966, the Back Room Rest, better known as the famous "Alice's Restaurant". During his time in Stockbridge, chief of police William Obanhein was a frequent model for Rockwell's paintings.

From 1961 until his death, Rockwell was a member of the Monday Evening Club, a men's literary group based in Pittsfield, Massachusetts. At his funeral, five members of the club served as pallbearers, along with Jarvis Rockwell.

His granddaughter is the translator Daisy Rockwell.

== Legacy ==
A custodianship of his original paintings and drawings was established with Rockwell's help near his home in Stockbridge, Massachusetts, and the Norman Rockwell Museum still is open today year-round. The museum's collection includes more than 700 original Rockwell paintings, drawings, and studies. The Rockwell Center for American Visual Studies at the Norman Rockwell Museum is a national research institute dedicated to American illustration art.

Rockwell's work was exhibited at the Solomon R. Guggenheim Museum in 2001. Rockwell's Breaking Home Ties sold for $15.4 million at a 2006 Sotheby's auction. A 12-city U.S. tour of Rockwell's works took place in 2008. In 2008, Rockwell was named the official state artist of the Commonwealth of Massachusetts. The 2013 sale of Saying Grace for $46 million (including buyer's premium) established a new record price for Rockwell. Rockwell's work was exhibited at the Reading Public Museum and the Church History Museum in 2013–2014.

Films have made references to Rockwell's work. In Steven Spielberg's 1987 film Empire of the Sun, the film's protagonist, a young boy named Jamie Graham (played by Christian Bale), is put to bed by his loving parents in a scene also inspired by a Rockwell painting—a reproduction of which is later kept by the boy during his captivity in a prison camp ("Freedom from Fear", 1943). The 1994 film Forrest Gump includes a shot in a school that re-creates Rockwell's The Young Lady with the Shiner with young Forrest in place of the girl. Much of the film drew heavy visual inspiration from Rockwell's art. Film director George Lucas owns Rockwell's original of "The Peach Crop", and his colleague Steven Spielberg owns a sketch of Rockwell's Triple Self-Portrait. Each of the artworks hangs in the respective filmmaker's work space. Rockwell is a major character in an episode of George Lucas' The Young Indiana Jones Chronicles, "Passion for Life", portrayed by Lukas Haas.

Some albums and tracks have had inspiration taken from Rockwell. In 1981, Rockwell's painting Girl at Mirror was used for the cover of Prism's fifth studio album Small Change. "Dreamland", a track from Canadian alternative rock band Our Lady Peace's 2009 album Burn Burn, was inspired by Rockwell's paintings. The cover for the Oingo Boingo album Only a Lad is a parody of the Boy Scouts of America 1960 official handbook cover illustrated by Rockwell. Lana Del Rey named her sixth studio album, Norman Fucking Rockwell! (2019), after Rockwell.

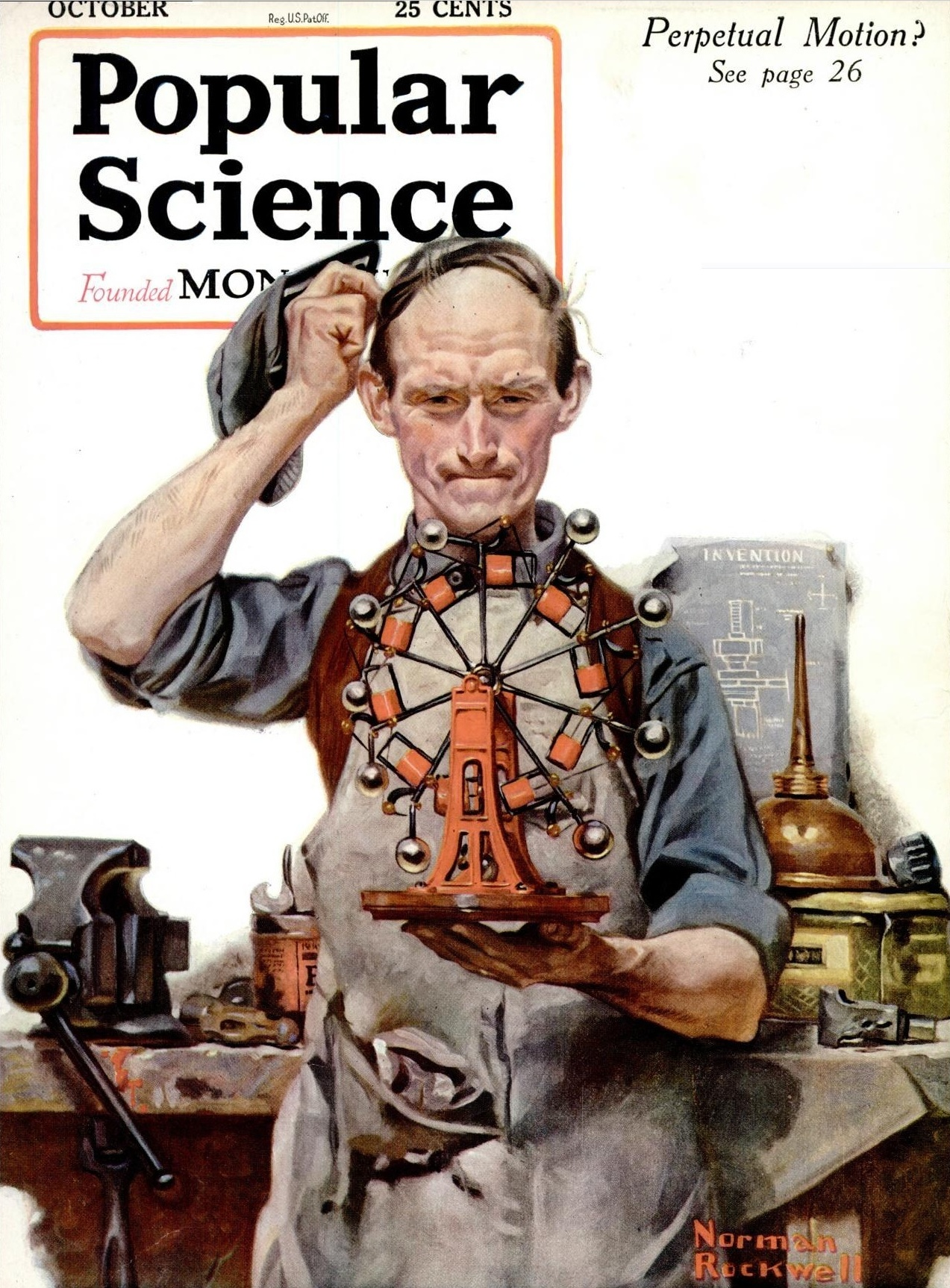
Cover of October 1920 issue of Popular Science magazine

Rockwell is among the figures depicted in Our Nation's 200th Birthday, The Telephone's 100th Birthday (1976) by Stanley Meltzoff for Bell System which Meltzoff based on Rockwell's 1948 painting The Gossips.

Japanese carmaker Suzuki used excerpts from Rockwell's art in its 1986 brochure for the "Mighty Boy" small pickup truck, including an image that was on the cover of the April 29, 1922, issue of the Saturday Evening Post.

Museum director Thomas S. Buechner said that Rockwell's art is important for standing the test of time, "When the last half century is explored by the future, a few paintings will continue to communicate with the same immediacy and veracity they have today."

In 2005, May Corporation, that previously bought Marshall Field's from Target Corp., was bought by Federated Department Stores. After the sale, Federated discovered that Rockwell's The Clock Mender displayed in the store was a reproduction. Rockwell had donated the painting, which depicts a repairman setting the time on one of the Marshall Field and Company Building clocks, and was depicted on the cover of the November 3, 1945 Saturday Evening Post, to the store in 1948. Target had since donated the original to the Chicago History Museum.

On an anniversary of Norman Rockwell's birth, on February 3, 2010, Google featured Rockwell's iconic image of young love "Boy and Girl Gazing at the Moon", which is also known as "Puppy Love", on its home page. The response was so great that day that the Norman Rockwell museum's servers were overwhelmed by the volume of traffic.

In 2017, the original 1948 oil study for Tough Call (also known as Game Called Because of Rain), one of Rockwell's best-known baseball-themed works, sold for US $1.68 million at Heritage Auctions. The painting had hung for years in a Texas family's home before being identified as a Rockwell and became one of the highest prices ever achieved for a Rockwell study.

On November 2, 2025, the Norman Rockwell family published an essay in the opinion section of USA Today denouncing the Donald Trump administration's Department of Homeland Security's unauthorized use of several Rockwell paintings in social media posts along with nationalist slogans promoting anti-immigration policy initiatives.

If Norman Rockwell were alive today, he would be devastated to see [...] his own work has been marshalled for the cause of persecution toward immigrant communities and people of color.

== Major works ==
- Boy with Baby Carriage (1916)
- Children Dancing at a Party (1918)
- The Love Song (1926)
- The Four Freedoms (1943)
  - Freedom of Speech (1943)
  - Freedom of Worship (1943)
  - Freedom from Want (1943)
  - Freedom from Fear (1943)
- Rosie the Riveter (1943)
- So You Want to See the President! (1943)
- Little Girl Observing Lovers on a Train (1944)
- We, Too, Have a Job to Do (1944)
- Working on the Statue of Liberty (1946)
- The Dugout (1948)
- Tough Call (1948)
- Saying Grace (1951)
- Walking to Church (1953)
- The Young Lady with the Shiner (1953)
- Breaking Home Ties (1954)
- At the Optometrist (1955)
- Marriage License (1955)
- The Scoutmaster (1956)
- The Rookie (1957)
- The Runaway (1958)
- Triple Self-Portrait (1960)
- Golden Rule (1961)
- The Connoisseur (1962)
- The Marriage Counselor (1963)
- Growth of a Leader (1964)
- The Problem We All Live With (1964)
- Murder in Mississippi (1965)
- New Kids in the Neighborhood (1967)
- Russian Schoolroom (1967)
- The Spirit of 1976 (1976)

== Film posters and album covers ==
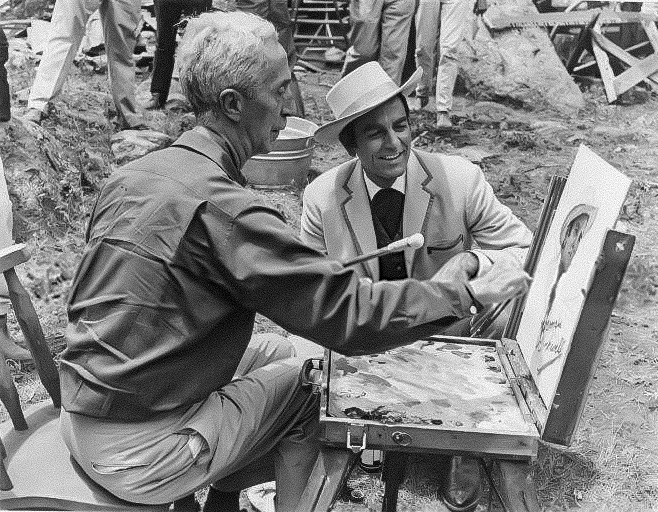
Rockwell painting actor Mike Connors's portrait on the set of Stagecoach (1966)

Rockwell provided illustrations for several film posters.

- The Adventures of Marco Polo (1938)
- The Magnificent Ambersons (1942)
- The Song of Bernadette (1943)
- Along Came Jones (1945)
- The Razor's Edge (1946)
- Cinderfella (1960)
- Stagecoach (1966)

He designed an album cover for The Live Adventures of Mike Bloomfield and Al Kooper (1969). He was also commissioned by English musician David Bowie to design the cover artwork for his 1975 album Young Americans, but the offer was retracted after Rockwell informed him he would need at least half a year to complete a painting for the album.

== Displays ==
- Norman Rockwell Museum in Stockbridge, Massachusetts
- Rockwell Collection at the National Museum of American Illustration
- Rockwell illustrations for The Adventures of Tom Sawyer and Adventures of Huckleberry Finn at the Mark Twain Museum in Hannibal Missouri.
- Norman Rockwell World War II posters, hosted by the University of North Texas Libraries Digital Collections
- Norman Rockwell and the Art of Scouting at the National Scouting Museum, Irving, Texas
- Norman Rockwell Exhibit in Arlington, Vermont

== Honors ==
- Society of Illustrators Hall of Fame, first inductee 1958

== See also ==
- J. C. Leyendecker, Rockwell's predecessor and stylistic inspiration
- James K. Van Brunt, a frequent model for Rockwell
- William Obanhein, another one of Rockwell's models who would later become famous elsewhere
- Norman Rockwell's World... An American Dream, a 1972 short documentary film
- List of people from Harlem

== Sources ==
- Claridge, Laura P. (2001). Norman Rockwell: A Life. New York: Random House. ISBN 978-0-375-50453-2 – via the Internet Archive (registration required).
- Gherman, Beverly (2000). Norman Rockwell: Storyteller with a Brush. New York: Atheneum Books. ISBN 978-0-689-82001-4 – via the Internet Archive (registration required).
- Moline, Mary (1979). Norman Rockwell Encyclopedia: A Chronological Catalog of the Artist's Work, 1910–1978. Indianapolis: Curtis Publishing Company. ISBN 0-89387-032-3 – via the Internet Archive (registration required).
