= Saying Grace (Rockwell) =

1951 painting by Norman Rockwell

- Artist: Norman Rockwell
- Year: 1951
- Medium: Oil on canvas
- Dimensions: 110 cm × 100 cm (42 in × 40 in)
- Location: Private collection

Saying Grace is a 1951 painting by American illustrator Norman Rockwell, painted for the cover of The Saturday Evening Post's November 24, 1951, Thanksgiving issue.

The painting depicts a woman and a young boy saying grace in a crowded restaurant, as they are observed by other people at their table. Rockwell's inspiration for Saying Grace came from a Saturday Evening Post reader who saw a Mennonite family praying in a restaurant. Rockwell used his son, Jarvis, as one of the models for the painting. Elizabeth Goldberg, director of American Art at Sotheby's said that in his preparations for Saying Grace Rockwell "... visited Automats and diners in New York and Philadelphia to get the scene just right ... his imagery was so vivid people would say they recognized the diner even though it didn't exist, each painting felt so universal." Rockwell took the table and chairs from a diner in Times Square for the photo shoot for the painting. In preparations for a painting Rockwell would set up a scene, using his friends and neighbors, taking hundreds of photos until satisfied. Rockwell would produce sketches in charcoal, then oil sketches, before painting the final image.

Rockwell was paid $3,500 (equivalent to $43,413 in 2025) for Saying Grace. Readers of The Saturday Evening Post voted Saying Grace their favorite ever cover in 1955. Saying Grace had been on a long-term loan at the Norman Rockwell Museum, and had been exhibited at 12 other museums across the United States before its 2013 sale.

== 2013 sale ==
Saying Grace sold for $46 million (including a buyer's premium) at Sotheby's in December 2013, setting a new record price for Rockwell's art. Rockwell's previous record had been set in 2006 by the $15 million sale of Breaking Home Ties. Saying Grace had been expected to sell for between $15 million and $20 million. The buyer of Saying Grace was not identified.

Two other Rockwell paintings that had been loaned to the Norman Rockwell Museum were sold alongside Saying Grace; The Gossips and Walking to Church. The three paintings, along with four other art works by Rockwell, were sold by the descendants of Kenneth J. Stuart, the art director of The Saturday Evening Post. The sale of the art works was initiated after the conclusion of a legal disagreement among Stuart's sons. A long term colleague of Rockwell's, Stuart had been given the paintings by Rockwell as a gift. Saying Grace had hung in Stuart's office at the Saturday Evening Post, and subsequently in the Stuarts' living room in Wilton, Connecticut. Stuart's sons could no longer afford the insurance and upkeep of the paintings by the time of their 2013 sale.

Upon Stuart's death in 1993, his estate was divided equally among his three sons, Ken Jr., William, and Jonathan. The oldest brother, Ken Jr., was subsequently sued by William and Jonathan, who claimed that he had forced their father to sign papers so he could gain control of his fortune. They additionally claimed that Ken Jr. had used the assets of his father's estate for his own expenses. The three brothers settled out of court before the sale. The owner of The Saturday Evening Post, Curtis Publishing Company, which retains reproduction rights to Rockwell's artworks, also unsuccessfully attempted to claim ownership of the paintings.

The director of the Norman Rockwell Museum, Laurie Norton Moffatt, has expressed her hope that the paintings will eventually be reunited with the museum. Moffatt said of the paintings that "We cared for them like children ... We hope they come back some day. We believe that's where they belong." Moffatt said that the loss of the paintings left an "irreplaceable hole in the museum's collection."
