= Willie Gillis =

Fictional character by Norman Rockwell

The Willie Gillis debut: Willie Gillis Food Package (October 4, 1941)

Willie Gillis Home on Leave (November 29, 1941)

Willie Gillis series
Norman Rockwell
The Saturday Evening Post

Willie Gillis, Jr. (more commonly simply Willie Gillis) is a fictional character created by Norman Rockwell for a series of World War II paintings that appeared on the covers of 11 issues of The Saturday Evening Post between 1941 and 1946. Gillis was an everyman with the rank of private whose career was tracked on the cover of the Post from induction through discharge without being depicted in battle. He and his girlfriend were modeled by two of Rockwell's acquaintances.

Gillis was not exclusively used on Post covers, but the Willie Gillis series of covers was a hallmark of Rockwell's wartime work. Rockwell was in his prime, and the Post was at the peak of its popularity with a subscribership of four million; many of those subscribers believed that Gillis was a real person. Rockwell's wartime art contributed to the success of the wartime bond sales efforts, including Willie Gillis, the Four Freedoms, and Rosie the Riveter.

The Gillis series has been included in two major Rockwell tours since 1999. It toured as part of a Rockwell Post cover art retrospective from 1999 to 2002, and as part of a 1940s World War II Rockwell art exhibition from 2006 to 2010.

== Background ==
From 1916 through his John F. Kennedy memorial cover on December 16, 1963, Rockwell created 321 magazine covers for the Post, which was the most popular American magazine of the first half of the 20th century, with a subscribership that reached a peak of 4 million. Rockwell illustrated American life during World War I and World War II in 34 of his cover illustrations, and he illustrated 33 Post covers in total during World War II. Some of the war art involved American life. During much of the first half of the 1940s, Rockwell's cover illustrations focused on the human side of the war. Rockwell encouraged support of the war efforts during World War II by means of his covers that endorsed war bonds, encouraged women to work, and encouraged men to enlist in the service. His World War II illustrations used themes of patriotism, longing, shifting gender roles, reunion, love, work, community and family during wartime to promote the war. In his role as a magazine illustrator during times of war, Rockwell draws comparisons to Winslow Homer, an American Civil War illustrator for Harper's Weekly. Rockwell's artistic expressions were said to have helped the adoption of the goal of the Four Freedoms as set forth by United States President Franklin Roosevelt's 1941 State of the Union Address. His painting series, the Four Freedoms, toured in a war bond effort that raised $132 million.

Willie Gillis was a freckle-faced All-American character who served as one of Rockwell's main coverboys during World War II. The Gillis character is widely referred to as an everyman who epitomized the typical American World War II soldier. Rockwell created Gillis in 1940 as the European Theater of World War II was escalating and Americans were enlisting or being drafted into the armed forces under the Selective Training and Service Act of 1940. Rockwell credits the name Willie Gillis to his wife, who derived it from the old nursery rhyme Wee Willie Winkie. Rockwell described Gillis as "an inoffensive, ordinary little guy thrown into the chaos of war". The public identified with Rockwell's portrayal of the "little guy" living up to a sense of duty in this time of war. Gillis was truly seen as the typical G.I., and Rockwell's wartime art remains quite popular: his signed original May 29, 1943 depiction of Rosie the Riveter sold at a Sotheby's auction on May 22, 2002, for $4,959,500. Some of the Willie Gillis paintings and the Rosie the Riveter painting were raffled off during the United States Department of the Treasury's Second War Loan Drive, which ran from April 12 – May 1, 1943. The Gillis character endures generations later for literary and artistic comparison.

== Post illustrations ==
Willie Gillis in Convoy (1943) was a depiction of Gillis close to the battlefield that was not used as cover art.

Willie Gillis in College (October 5, 1946) broke with the style of the wartime posters, depicting Gillis as a civilian in a peaceful environment.

=== Series review ===
In Willie Gillis: Food Package, 1941, he toted a care package. Ten subsequent covers depicted Gillis in a variety of roles: at church in uniform, holding his hat on his lap; the soldier on K.P. duty; the son carrying on the family tradition of military service; a still life of Gillis's family photographs; and two fighting-mad girls, holding pictures of Gillis that he had sent each of them from the war zone. Gillis matured over the course of the series until he was almost unrecognizable in the final work. Rockwell created a good ending for the series by depicting Gillis relaxing while studying at college on the G.I. Bill: "We know that things ended well for Gillis, though; his final cover in 1946 showed the young man stretched in a windowsill smoking a pipe and wearing penny loafers, studying at Middlebury College."

To some, the fourth piece – Willie Gillis: Hometown News – was the one that cemented Willie Gillis's place in American history, because families identified with Gillis. The sixth piece, Willie Gillis in Church, is the earliest of his works with significant religious themes. This final component of the series, Willie Gillis in College, engenders much critical review because it is perceived to represent a transformation of character. It is owned by the Washington Mutual Bank of Seattle. In 2000, they loaned it to the University of Wisconsin–Madison. It is a study in contrast of mood and style from the wartime components of the series. Throughout the cover series Gillis was never pictured in battle or in any sort of danger, armed or with armed foes because Rockwell felt those portrayals were better exhibited by newsreels and photographs.

Rockwell produced at least one depiction of Gillis that was not on the cover. The painting Willie Gillis in Convoy was produced in 1943, depicting Gillis, in combat gear, in the back of a covered military vehicle with his rifle in hand. Rockwell donated the painting to the Gardner High School for the graduating class, where it hung in the principal's office until 2000. The school then loaned it to the Gardner Museum. A charcoal sketch of the painting sold for $107,000 in 1999. There was concern that the painting was not hung in a secure location. In 2005, the painting was restored and rehung at the high school. In 2014, it was sold for $1.9 million, with the proceeds used to create a foundation to benefit the schools in Gardner.

=== Models ===
Robert Otis Buck served as Rockwell's model for Gillis and eventually enlisted for service in the Navy. His job in Arlington was as a sawmill hand. He met Rockwell to pose the first time when he was 15, and he stood 5 feet 4 inches (1.63 m) tall and had a lock of hair that dropped down on his forehead. Rockwell had been seeking a model, and he met Buck at a square dance in Arlington, Vermont. Rockwell observed him from different angles during the dance, and Buck told him that he would "knock him flat" if he did not stop staring.

Buck had been exempted from the military draft, but he felt that serving his country was his patriotic duty and enlisted as a naval aviator in 1943. He served in the South Seas during the war. Rockwell worked from memory and photographs to complete his illustrations while Buck was overseas, and sometimes he only worked Gillis into the background via a photograph on the wall. He was going to discontinue the series, but Post editors objected because his character was too popular. The public enjoyed closely scrutinizing Gillis' affairs. Gillis was so popular that the Post received hundreds of letters inquiring about his tribulations, as many perceived him as real, and concern was particularly high among families named Gillis.

The model who portrayed Gillis's girlfriend was Post illustrator Mead Schaeffer's daughter. She remained available despite Buck's departure, so Rockwell painted her faithfully sleeping at midnight on New Year's Eve with photos of Willie Gillis in the background above her bed in Willie Gillis: New Year's Eve. The subsequent 11 inches (280 mm) × 14 inches (360 mm) Willie Gillis cover was Willie Gillis: Generations depicting the Gillis military family in pictures above a bookshelf of Gillis war books. It generated hundreds of letters from Gillises, many of whom wanted to buy the imaginary books. Mead's daughters Lee and Patty Schaeffer showed vying affections for Gillis in one Post cover.

== Modern references ==
The woman who posed for illustrations of Gillis's girlfriend was included in the 90-minute PBS American Masters series film Norman Rockwell: Painting America. The film coincided with the first comprehensive Rockwell touring exhibition, entitled Norman Rockwell: Pictures for the American People, which was a seven-city tour. The High Museum of Art and the Norman Rockwell Museum produced the exhibition that started at the High Museum on November 6, 1999, stopped at the Chicago Historical Society, Corcoran Gallery of Art, San Diego Museum of Art, Phoenix Art Museum, and Norman Rockwell Museum before concluding at the Solomon R. Guggenheim Museum on February 11, 2002. After the official tour ended, his post covers were on display at the Florida International Museum from April 2002 until June 16, 2002. In September 2002, they were exhibited at the Eastern States Exposition in West Springfield, Massachusetts. During the first 16 days of the fair, through Saturday September 28, the attendance was 1,052,511. From 2006 through 2010 Gillis appeared along with the Four Freedoms and Rosie The Riveter in a travelling exhibition entitled Norman Rockwell in the 1940s: A View of the American Homefront. The 44-piece exhibition was organized by the Norman Rockwell Museum and made stops in places such as the Pensacola Museum of Art (April–July 2006), Rogers Historical Museum (June–August 2007), James A. Michener Art Museum (October 19, 2007 – February 10, 2008) and National Museum of the Marine Corps (September 28, 2009 – January 9, 2010).

== Willie Gillis series ==
Rockwell did not name his works, but many of them have one or two names by which they are known. The following are the eleven Willie Gillis Saturday Evening Post cover paintings:

1. October 4, 1941 – Willie Gillis: Food Package/Willie Gillis: Package From Home
2. November 29, 1941 – Willie Gillis: Home Sweet Home/Willie Gillis: Home On Leave
3. February 7, 1942 – Willie Gillis: USO
4. April 11, 1942 – Willie Gillis: Hometown News/Willie Gillis: On K.P.
5. June 27, 1942 – Willie Gillis: What To Do in a Blackout
6. July 25, 1942 – Willie Gillis in Church
7. September 5, 1942 – Willie Gillis: Girls with Letters/Double Trouble for Willie Gillis
8. June 26, 1943 – Willie Gillis: Cat's Cradle/Willie's Rope Trick
9. January 1, 1944 – Willie Gillis: New Year's Eve
10. September 16, 1944 – Willie Gillis: Gillis Heritage/Willie Gillis Generations
11. October 5, 1946 – Willie Gillis in College

== See also ==
- Norman Rockwell Museum
