= Murder in Mississippi (painting) =

1965 painting by Norman Rockwell

- Artist: Norman Rockwell
- Year: 1965
- Medium: Oil on canvas
- Dimensions: 134.5 cm × 106.5 cm (53 in × 42 in)
- Location: Norman Rockwell Museum

Murder in Mississippi, as named by the artist, is a 1965 painting by Norman Rockwell which was commissioned for an article titled "Southern Justice" in the American magazine Look. The painting depicts the 1964 murders of civil rights activists James Chaney, Andrew Goodman and Michael Schwerner, and was intended to illustrate an article written on the murders, by civil rights attorney Charles Morgan Jr. The painting is oil on canvas 53 × 42 inches (134.5 × 106.5 cm), and also has a pencil on board study of the same title, both of which reside in the collections of the Norman Rockwell Museum.

== Development of the painting ==
Murder in Mississippi (study) a.k.a. Southern Justice
- Artist: Norman Rockwell
- Year: 1965
- Medium: Oil on board
- Dimensions: (15" in × 12¾" in)
- Location: Norman Rockwell Museum

Originally Murder in Mississippi was to fill two pages, with the victims on the left page and the murderers on the right page. Pencil sketches were made for both panels. A preparatory study in black and white shows the complete horizontal picture with Price pointing a pistol, and several klansmen with sticks. (The assailants were later found to have carried rifles.) On the bottom left corner, another klansman is featured, making the three young men surrounded. However, when cropped to include only the left side, the killers on both sides of the young men were removed, leaving only the shadows cast from the group on the right.

The left panel was submitted as a rough oil color sketch to Look magazine's art director Allen Hurlburt. Based on the oil sketch, Look gave Rockwell the okay to proceed and finish the painting. However, later when Hurlburt received the finished painting, he decided that the more impressionistic sketch suited the article better and the finished painting was not published. This was the only time that one of Rockwell's sketches was published instead of his finished painting. Rockwell's oil sketch had only taken an hour, though Rockwell himself later admitted that by the time he finished the final painting, "all the anger that was in the sketch had gone out of it."

The overall composition and lighting used in the piece echo The Third of May 1808, an 1814 painting by Francisco Goya with a similar subject matter. The standing and kneeling figures of Schwerner and Chaney are posed similarly to the figures in journalist Héctor Rondón's 1962 photograph Aid from the Padre, of a priest providing comfort to a wounded soldier during El Porteñazo in Venezuela.

The oil sketch for Murder in Mississippi is also known as Southern Justice, after the title of the article with which it was published on June 29, 1965. The sketch is oil on board, 15" × 12¾", and, like the finished painting, is held in the permanent collection of the Norman Rockwell Museum.

== See also ==
- Civil rights movement in popular culture
