= Norman Rockwell Museum =

Art museum in Stockbridge, Massachusetts

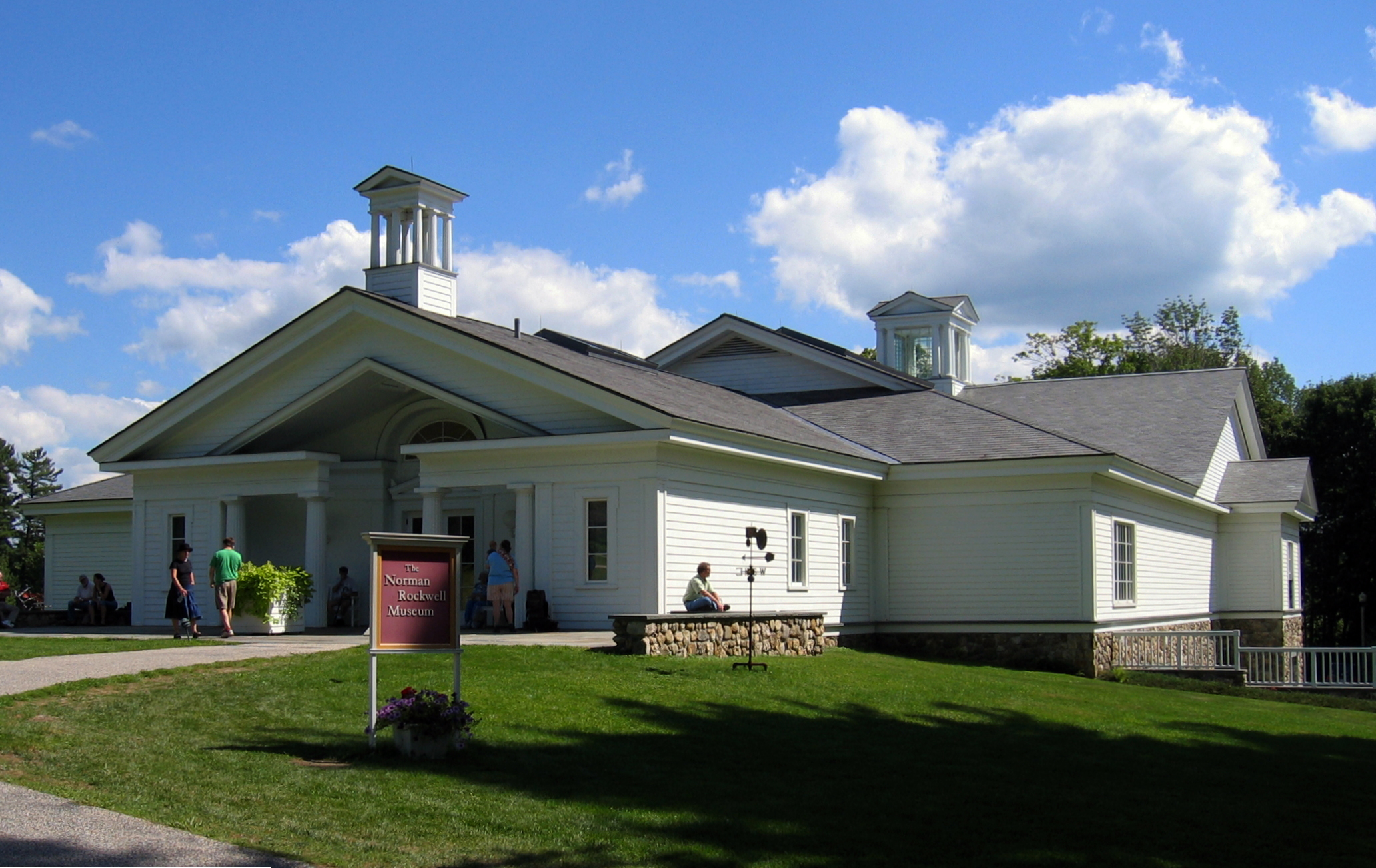
- Norman Rockwell Museum main entrance (August 2005)
- Interactive fullscreen map
- Established: April 3, 1993 (current building)
- Location: Stockbridge, Massachusetts
- Coordinates: 42°17′17″N 73°20′09″W
- Type: Art museum
- Key holdings: Four Freedoms, Norman Rockwell Archives
- Director: Laurie Norton Moffatt
- President: Alice Carter
- Architect: Robert A. M. Stern
- Parking: free parking onsite
- Website: www.nrm.org

The Norman Rockwell Museum is an art museum in Stockbridge, Massachusetts, United States, dedicated to the art of Norman Rockwell. It is home to the world's largest collection of original Rockwell art. The museum also hosts traveling exhibitions pertaining to American illustration.

== History ==
The museum was founded in 1969 in Stockbridge, Massachusetts, where Rockwell lived the last 25 years of his life. Originally located on Main Street in a building known as the Old Corner House, the museum moved to its current location 24 years later, opening to the public on April 3, 1993. The current museum building was designed by 2011 Driheaus Prize winner and New Classical architect Robert A. M. Stern.

== Collection ==
In addition to 574 original works of art by Rockwell, the museum also houses the Norman Rockwell Archives, a collection of more than 100,000 items, including photographs, fan mail, and various business documents. In 2014, the Famous Artists School donated its archives, including process drawings by Rockwell, who was one of its founding faculty members (in 1948), to the museum.

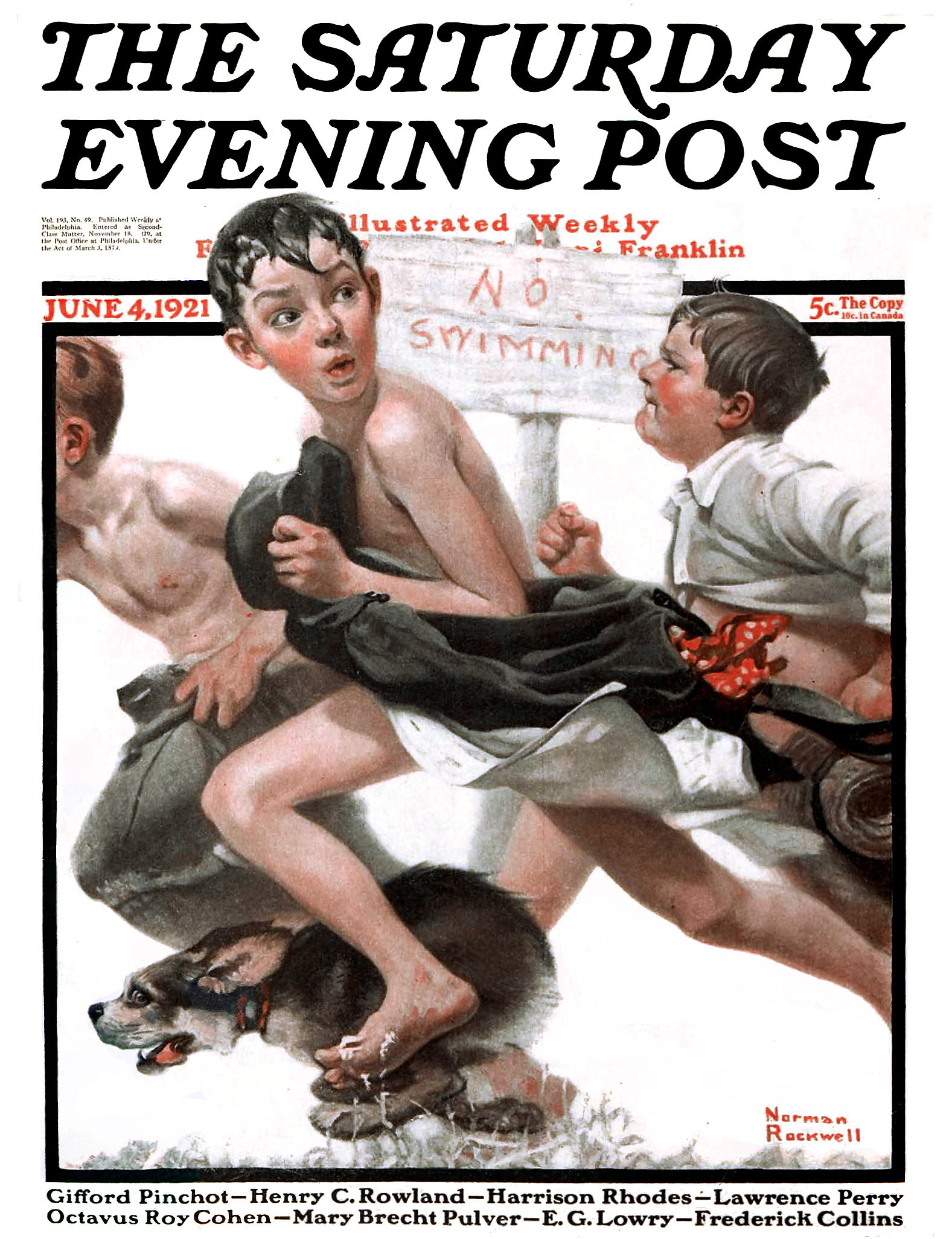
No Swimming by Rockwell (1921)

Works by Rockwell at the museum include:

- Boy with Baby Carriage, 1916
- No Swimming, 1921
- Girl Reading the Post (1941) – In 1943, Rockwell gifted this painting to Walt Disney whose daughter, Diane Disney Miller, gifted it to The Norman Rockwell Museum at Stockbridge in 2000
- Four Freedoms, 1943
  - Freedom of Speech
  - Freedom of Worship
  - Freedom from Want
  - Freedom from Fear
- Going and Coming, 1947
- Christmas Homecoming, 1948
- Day in the Life of a Little Girl, 1952
- Girl at Mirror, 1954
- Art Critic, 1955
- Marriage License, 1955
- The Runaway, 1958
- Family Tree, 1959
- The Problem We All Live With, 1963
- Murder in Mississippi, 1965
- The Peace Corps (JFK's Bold Legacy), 1966
- Home for Christmas (Stockbridge Main Street at Christmas), 1967

The museum also houses the Rockwell Center for American Visual Studies, a national research institute dedicated to American illustration art.

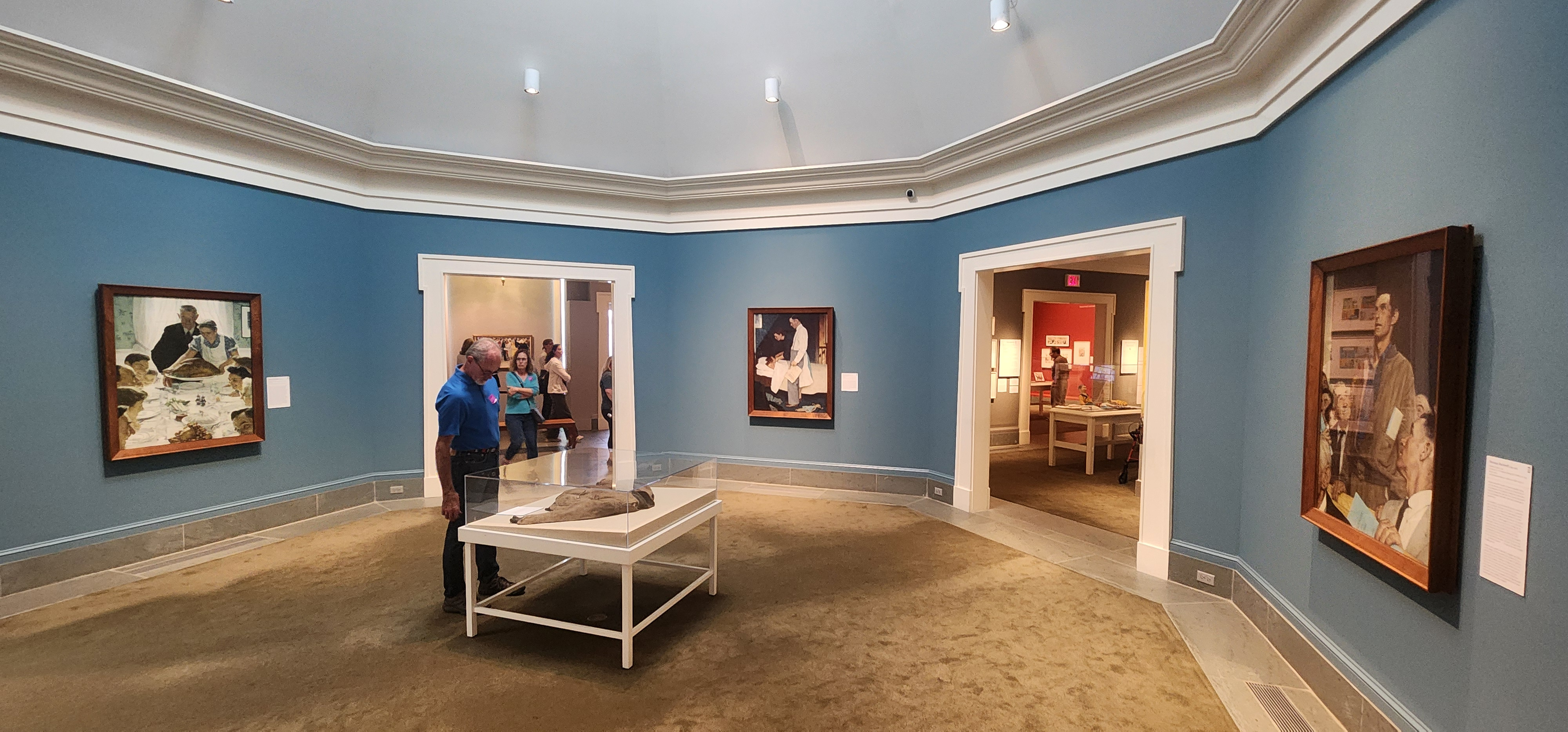
The central room displaying the "Four Freedoms" paintings. At center is the jacket worn by the model in the "Freedom of Speech" painting.

== Awards and grants ==
In 2008, the museum received the National Humanities Medal from the National Endowment for the Humanities. In 2016, the museum received a grant of $1.5 million from the George Lucas Family Foundation, which will be used by "the museum's digital learning and engagement division to create multimedia experiences."

== See also ==
- List of single-artist museums

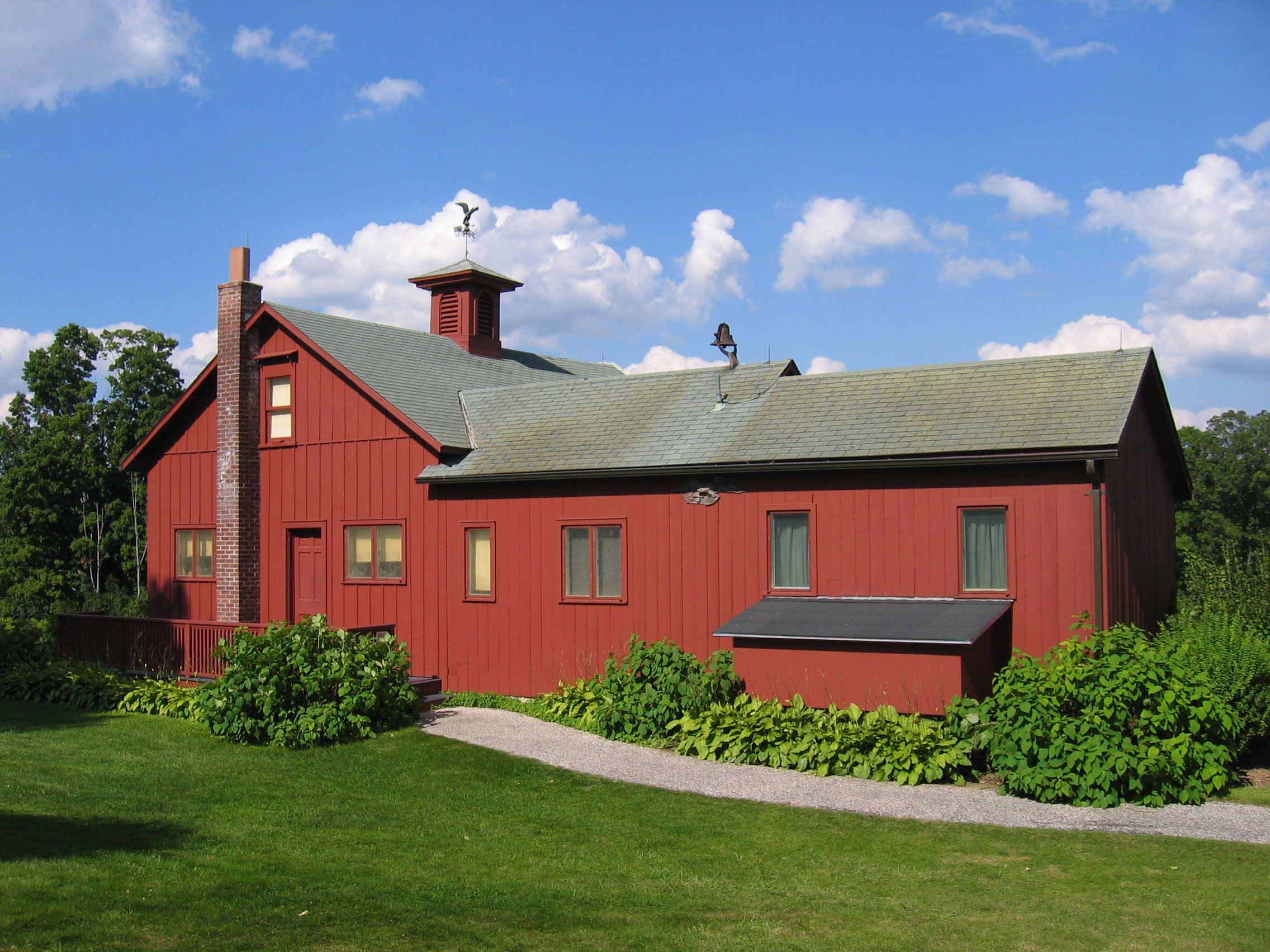
Norman Rockwell's studio
