= Presidency of Harry S. Truman =

U.S. presidential administration from 1945 to 1953

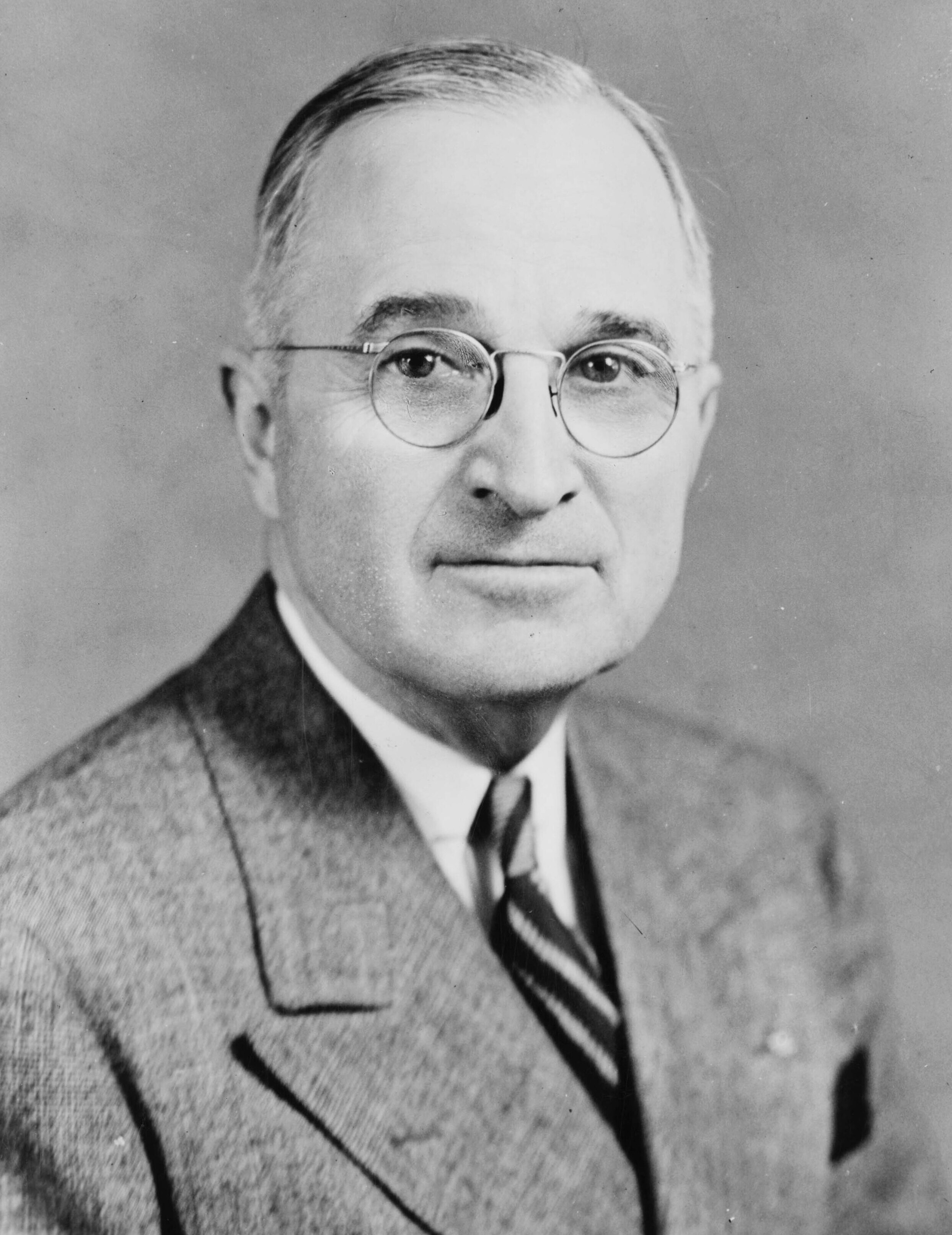
- Official portrait, 1945
- Presidency of Harry S. Truman; April 12, 1945 – January 20, 1953
- Vice President: None (1945–1949) (Note: Truman was vice president under Franklin D. Roosevelt and became president upon Roosevelt's death on April 12, 1945. As this was prior to the adoption of the Twenty-fifth Amendment in 1967, a vacancy in the office of vice president was not filled until the next election and inauguration.); Alben W. Barkley (1949–1953)
- Cabinet: See list
- Party: Democratic
- Election: 1948
- Seat: White House
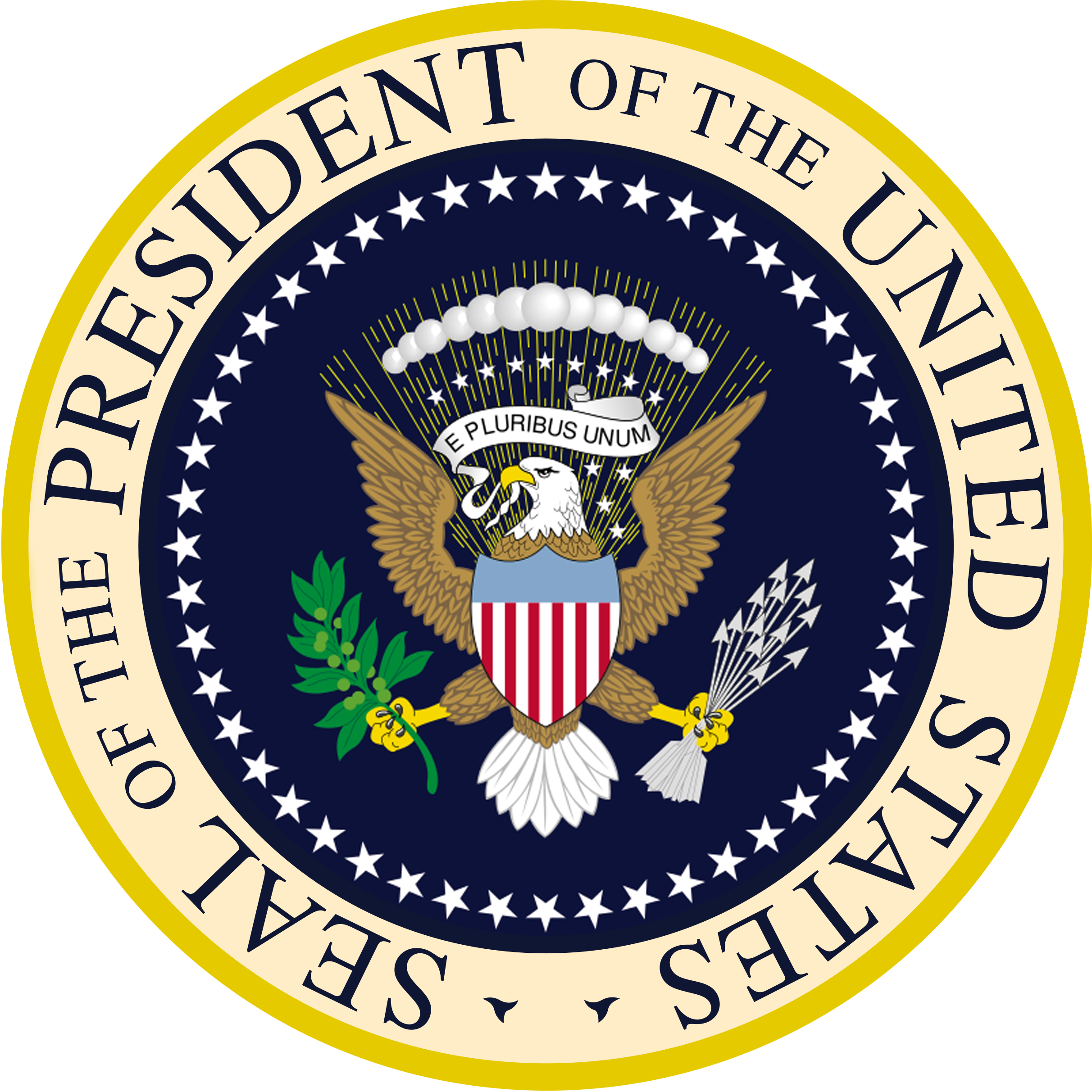
- Seal of the president (1945–1959)

Harry S. Truman's tenure as the 33rd president of the United States began on April 12, 1945, upon the death of President Franklin D. Roosevelt, and ended on January 20, 1953. He had been vice president for only 82 days when he succeeded to the presidency. Truman, a Democrat from Missouri, ran for and won a full four-year term in the 1948 presidential election, in which he narrowly defeated Republican nominee Thomas E. Dewey and Dixiecrat nominee Strom Thurmond. Although his existing term was exempt from the newly ratified Twenty-second Amendment that established a two-term limit for presidents, Truman withdrew his bid for a second full term in the 1952 presidential election because of his low popularity. He was succeeded by Republican Dwight D. Eisenhower.

Truman's presidency was a turning point in foreign affairs, as the United States engaged in an internationalist foreign policy and renounced isolationism. During his first year in office, Truman approved the atomic bombings of Hiroshima and Nagasaki and subsequently accepted the surrender of Japan, which marked the end of World War II. In the aftermath of World War II, he helped establish the United Nations and other post-war institutions. Relations with the Soviet Union declined after 1945, and by 1947 the two countries had entered a long period of tension and war preparation known as the Cold War, during which a hot fighting war with Moscow was avoided. Truman broke with Roosevelt's prior vice president Henry A. Wallace, who called for friendship with Moscow and ran as the presidential candidate of the Progressive Party in 1948. In 1947, Truman promulgated the Truman Doctrine, which called for the United States to prevent the spread of Communism through foreign aid to Greece and Turkey. In 1948 the Republican-controlled Congress approved the Marshall Plan, a massive financial aid package designed to rebuild Western Europe. In 1949, the Truman administration designed and presided over the creation of NATO, a military alliance of Western countries designed to prevent the further westward expansion of Soviet power.

Truman proposed an ambitious domestic liberal agenda known as the Fair Deal. However, nearly all his initiatives were blocked by the conservative coalition of Republicans and conservative Southern Democrats. Republicans took control of Congress in the 1946 elections after the strike wave of 1945–46. Truman suffered another major defeat by the conservative coalition when the 80th Congress passed the Taft–Hartley Act into law over his veto. It reversed some of the pro-labor union legislation that was central to the New Deal. When Robert A. Taft, the conservative Republican senator, unexpectedly supported the Housing Act of 1949, Truman achieved one new liberal program. Truman took a strong stance on civil rights, ordering equal rights in the military to the disgust of the white politicians in the Deep South. They supported a "Dixiecrat" third-party candidate, Strom Thurmond, in 1948. Truman later pushed for the integration of the military in the 1950s. During his presidency, fears of Soviet espionage led to a Seconded Red Scare; Truman denounced those who made unfounded accusations of Soviet sympathies, but also purged left-wing federal employees who refused to disavow Communism.

When Communist North Korea invaded South Korea in 1950, Truman sent U.S. troops to prevent the fall of South Korea. After initial successes, the war settled into a stalemate that lasted throughout the final years of Truman's presidency. Truman left office as one of the most unpopular presidents of the twentieth century, mainly due to the Korean War and his then controversial decision to dismiss General Douglas MacArthur, resulting in a huge loss of support. In the 1952 presidential election, Eisenhower successfully campaigned against what he denounced as Truman's failures: "Korea, Communism and Corruption". Nonetheless, Truman retained a strong reputation among scholars, and his public reputation eventually recovered in the 1960s. In polls of historians and political scientists, Truman is generally ranked as one of the ten greatest presidents.

== Accession ==
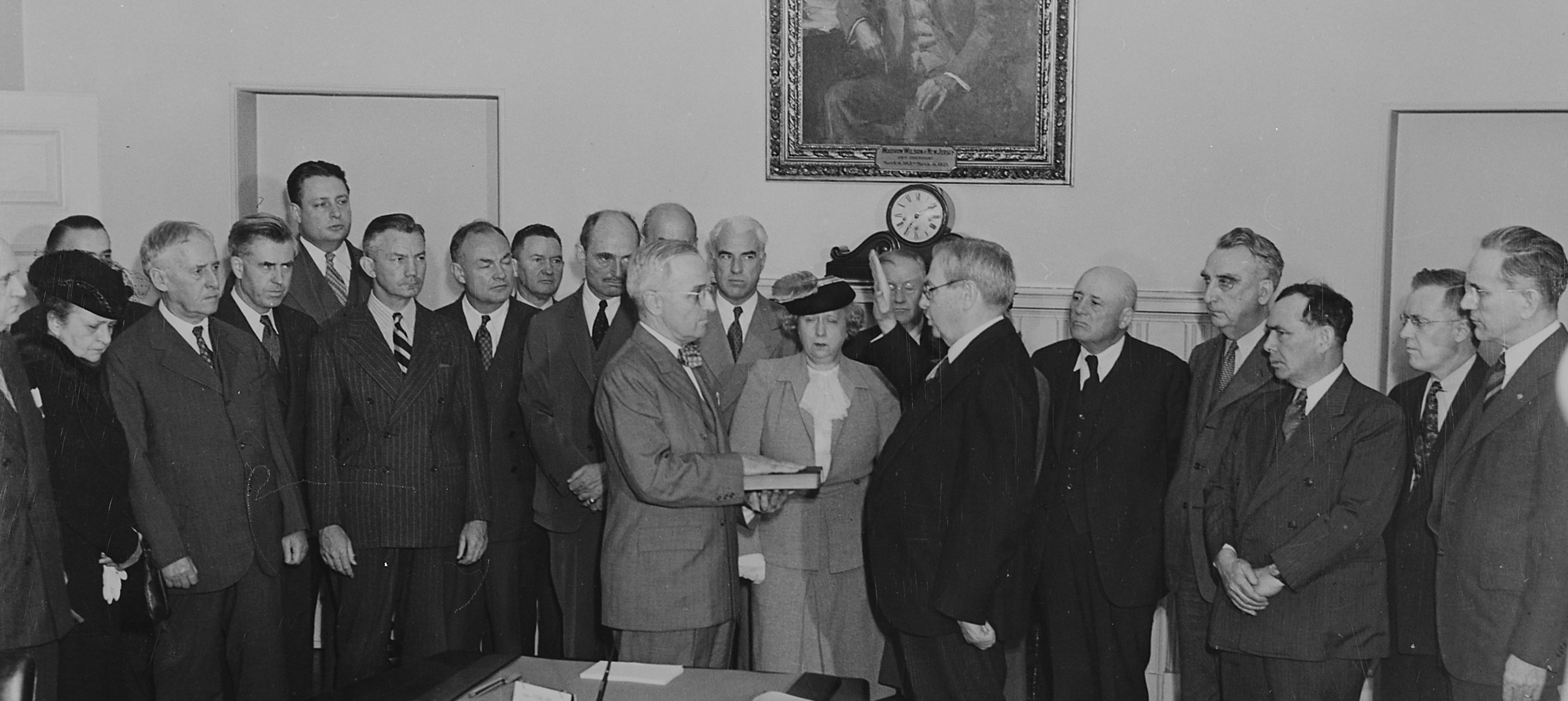
Truman is sworn in as the 33rd President of the United States by Chief Justice Harlan F. Stone in the White House Cabinet Room, while Bess Truman looks on.

President Franklin D. Roosevelt sought re-election in the 1944 presidential election. Roosevelt personally favored either incumbent Vice President Henry A. Wallace or James F. Byrnes as his running mate. However, Wallace was unpopular among conservatives in the Democratic Party. Byrnes, an ex-Catholic, was opposed by many liberals and Catholics. At the behest of party leaders, Roosevelt agreed to run with Truman, who was acceptable to all factions of the party, and Truman was nominated for vice president at the 1944 Democratic National Convention.

Democrats retained control of Congress and the presidency in the 1944 elections, and Truman took office as vice president in January 1945. He had no major role in the administration and was not informed of key developments, such as the atomic bomb. On April 12, 1945, Truman was urgently summoned to the White House, where he was met by Eleanor Roosevelt, who informed him that the President was dead. Shocked, Truman asked Mrs. Roosevelt, "Is there anything I can do for you?", to which she replied: "Is there anything we can do for you? For you are the one in trouble now." The day after assuming office Truman spoke to reporters: "Boys, if you ever pray, pray for me now. I don't know if you fellas ever had a load of hay fall on you, but when they told me what happened yesterday, I felt like the moon, the stars, and all the planets had fallen on me." Bipartisan favorable opinion gave the new president a honeymoon.

== Administration ==
Truman delegated a great deal of authority to his cabinet officials, only insisting that he give the final formal approval to all decisions. After getting rid of the Roosevelt holdovers, the cabinet members were mostly old confidants. The White House was badly understaffed with no more than a dozen aides; they could barely keep up with the heavy work flow of a greatly expanded executive department. Truman acted as his own chief of staff, as well as his own liaison with Congress—a body he already knew very well. Less important matters he delegated to his Special Counsels, Samuel Rosenman in 1945–46, Clark Clifford in 1946 to 1950 and Charles S. Murphy in 1950 to 1953. He was not well prepared to deal with the press. Filled with latent anger about all the setbacks in his career, he bitterly mistrusted the journalists, seeing them as enemies laying in wait for his next careless miscue. Truman was a very hard worker, often to the point of exhaustion, which left him testy and on the verge of appearing unpresidential. He discussed major issues in depth with cabinet and other advisors, such as the atom bomb, the Truman Plan, the Korean war, and the dismissal of General MacArthur. He mastered the details of the federal budget as well as anyone. Truman's myopia made it hard to read a typescript, and he was poor at prepared addresses. However, his visible anger made him an effective stump speaker, denouncing his enemies as his supporters hollered back at him, "Give Em Hell, Harry!"

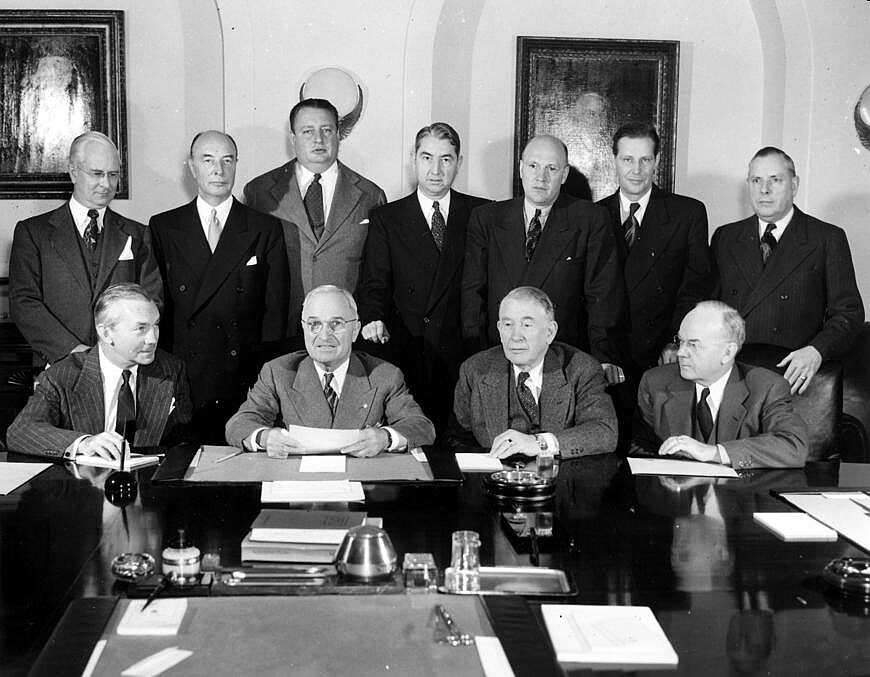
Truman's Cabinet, 1949

Truman cabinet
Office	Name	Term
President	Harry S. Truman	1945–1953
Vice President	none	1945–1949
Alben W. Barkley	1949–1953
Secretary of State	Edward Stettinius Jr.	1945
James F. Byrnes	1945–1947
George C. Marshall	1947–1949
Dean Acheson	1949–1953
Secretary of the Treasury	Henry Morgenthau Jr.	1945
Fred M. Vinson	1945–1946
John Wesley Snyder	1946–1953
Secretary of War	Henry L. Stimson	1945
Robert P. Patterson	1945–1947
Kenneth Claiborne Royall	1947
Secretary of Defense	James Forrestal	1947–1949
Louis A. Johnson	1949–1950
George C. Marshall	1950–1951
Robert A. Lovett	1951–1953
Attorney General	Francis Biddle	1945
Tom C. Clark	1945–1949
J. Howard McGrath	1949–1952
James P. McGranery	1952–1953
Postmaster General	Frank C. Walker	1945
Robert E. Hannegan	1945–1947
Jesse M. Donaldson	1947–1953
Secretary of the Navy	James Forrestal	1945–1947
Secretary of the Interior	Harold L. Ickes	1945–1946
Julius Albert Krug	1946–1949
Oscar L. Chapman	1949–1953
Secretary of Agriculture	Claude R. Wickard	1945
Clinton Anderson	1945–1948
Charles F. Brannan	1948–1953
Secretary of Commerce	Henry A. Wallace	1945–1946
W. Averell Harriman	1946–1948
Charles W. Sawyer	1948–1953
Secretary of Labor	Frances Perkins	1945
Lewis B. Schwellenbach	1945–1948
Maurice J. Tobin	1948–1953

At first Truman asked all the members of Roosevelt's cabinet to remain in place for the time being, but by the end of 1946 only one Roosevelt appointee, Secretary of the Navy James Forrestal, remained. Fred M. Vinson succeeded Treasury Secretary Henry Morgenthau Jr. in July 1945. Truman appointed Vinson to the Supreme Court in 1946 and John Wesley Snyder was named as the Treasury Secretary. Truman quickly replaced Secretary of State Edward Stettinius Jr. with James F. Byrnes, an old friend from Senate days. However Byrnes soon lost Truman's trust with his conciliatory policy towards Moscow in late 1945, and he was replaced by former General George Marshall in January 1947. Undersecretary of State Dean Acheson was the main force in foreign affairs along with a group of advisers known as the "Wise Men," Marshall emerged as the face of Truman's foreign policy.

In 1947, Forrestal became the first Secretary of Defense, overseeing all branches of the United States Armed Forces. A mental breakdown sent him into retirement in 1949, and he was replaced successively by Louis A. Johnson, Marshall, and finally Robert A. Lovett. Acheson was Secretary of State 1949–1953. Truman often appointed longtime personal friends, sometimes to positions well beyond their competence. Such friends included Vinson, Snyder, and military aide Harry H. Vaughan. Outside of the cabinet, Clark Clifford and John R. Steelman were staffers who handled lesser matters while Truman acted as his own chief off staff on big issues.

=== Vice presidency ===
The office of vice president remained vacant during Truman's first (3 years, 253 days partial) term, as the Constitution then had no provision for filling a vacancy prior to the 1967 ratification of the Twenty-fifth Amendment. Until the passage of the Presidential Succession Act of 1947, the Secretary of State was next in the presidential line of succession. After the passage of the act in July 1947, the Speaker of the House became the next-in-line. During different points of Truman's first term, Secretary of State Stettinius, Secretary of State Byrnes, Secretary of State Marshall, Speaker Joseph Martin, and Speaker Sam Rayburn would have succeeded to the presidency if Truman left office. Alben Barkley served as Truman's running mate in the 1948 election, and became vice president during Truman's second term. Truman included him in Cabinet deliberations.

== Judicial appointments ==
Truman made four appointments to the United States Supreme Court. After the retirement of Owen Roberts in 1945, Truman appointed Republican Senator Harold Hitz Burton of Ohio to the Supreme Court. Roberts was the lone remaining justice on the Supreme Court who had not been appointed or elevated to the position of chief justice by Roosevelt, and Truman believed it was important to nominate a Republican to succeed Roberts. Chief Justice Harlan F. Stone died in 1946, and Truman appointed Secretary of the Treasury Fred M. Vinson as Stone's successor. Two vacancies arose in 1949 due to deaths of Frank Murphy and Wiley Blount Rutledge. Truman appointed Attorney General Tom C. Clark to succeed Murphy and federal appellate judge Sherman Minton to succeed Rutledge. Vinson served for just seven years before his death in 1953, while Minton resigned from the Supreme Court in 1956. Burton served until 1958, often joining the conservative bloc led by Felix Frankfurter. Clark served until 1967, emerging as an important swing vote on the Vinson Court and the Warren Court. In addition to his Supreme Court appointments, Truman also appointed 27 judges to the courts of appeals and 101 judges to federal district courts.

== End of World War II ==
By April 1945, the Allied Powers were close to defeating Germany, but Japan remained a formidable adversary in the Pacific War. As vice president, Truman had been uninformed about major initiatives relating to the war, including the top-secret Manhattan Project, which was about to test the world's first atomic bomb. Although Truman was told briefly on the afternoon of April 12 that the Allies had a new, highly destructive weapon, it was not until April 25 that Secretary of War Henry Stimson told him the details of the atomic bomb, which was almost ready. Germany surrendered on May 8, 1945, ending the war in Europe. Truman's attention turned to the Pacific, where he hoped to end the war as quickly, and with as little expense in lives or government funds, as possible.

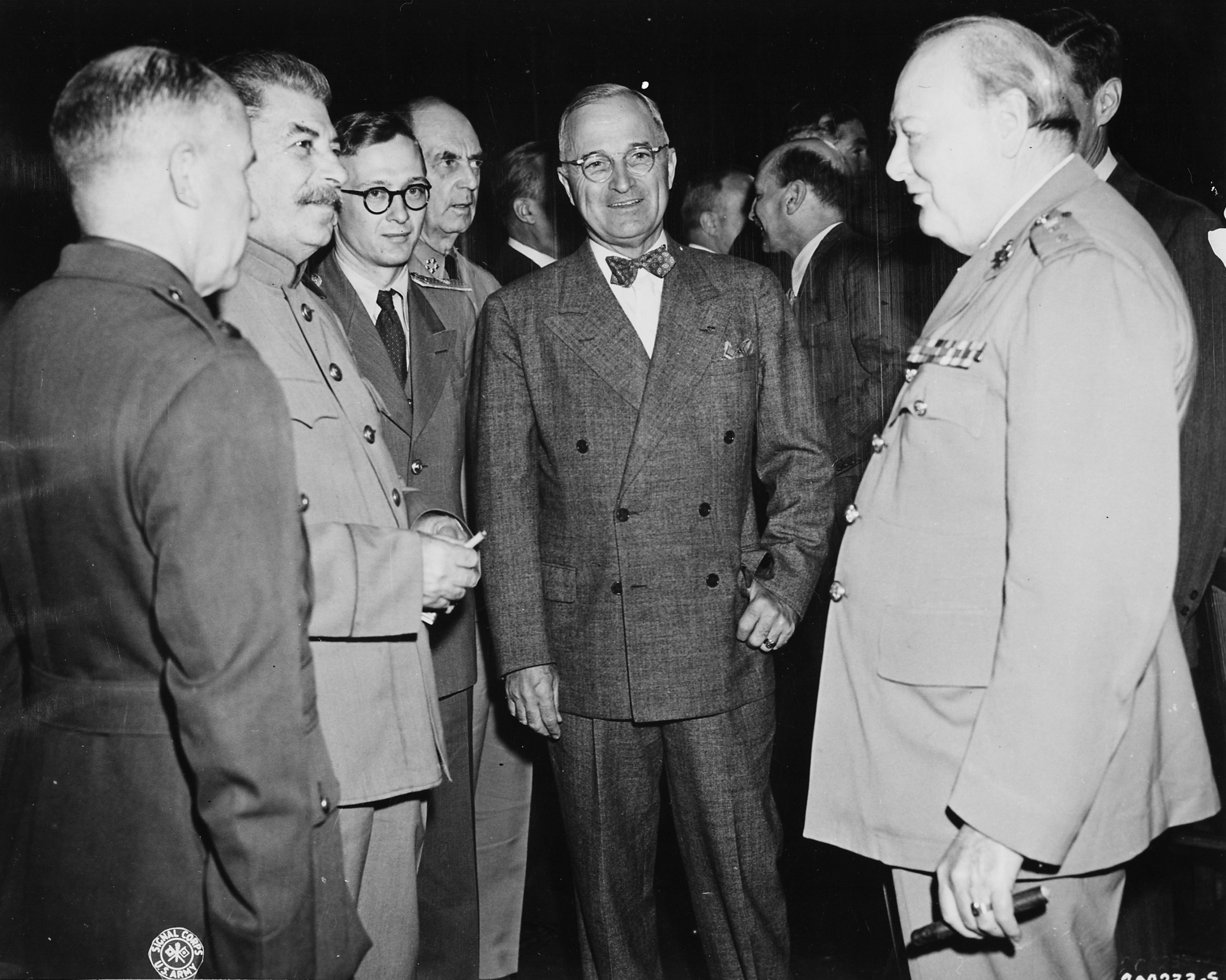
Joseph Stalin, Harry S. Truman, and Winston Churchill in Potsdam, July 1945

With the end of the war drawing near, Truman flew to Berlin for the Potsdam Conference, to meet with Soviet leader Joseph Stalin and British leader Winston Churchill regarding the post-war order. Several major decisions were made at the Potsdam Conference: Germany would be divided into four occupation zones (among the three powers and France), Germany's border was to be shifted west to the Oder–Neisse line, a Soviet-backed group was recognized as the legitimate government of Poland, and Vietnam was to be partitioned at the 16th parallel. The Soviet Union also agreed to launch an invasion of Japanese-held Manchuria. While at the Potsdam Conference, Truman was informed that the Trinity test of the first atomic bomb on July 16 had been successful. He hinted to Stalin that the U.S. was about to use a new kind of weapon against the Japanese. Though this was the first time the Soviets had been officially given information about the atomic bomb, Stalin was already aware of the bomb project, having learned about it through espionage long before Truman did.

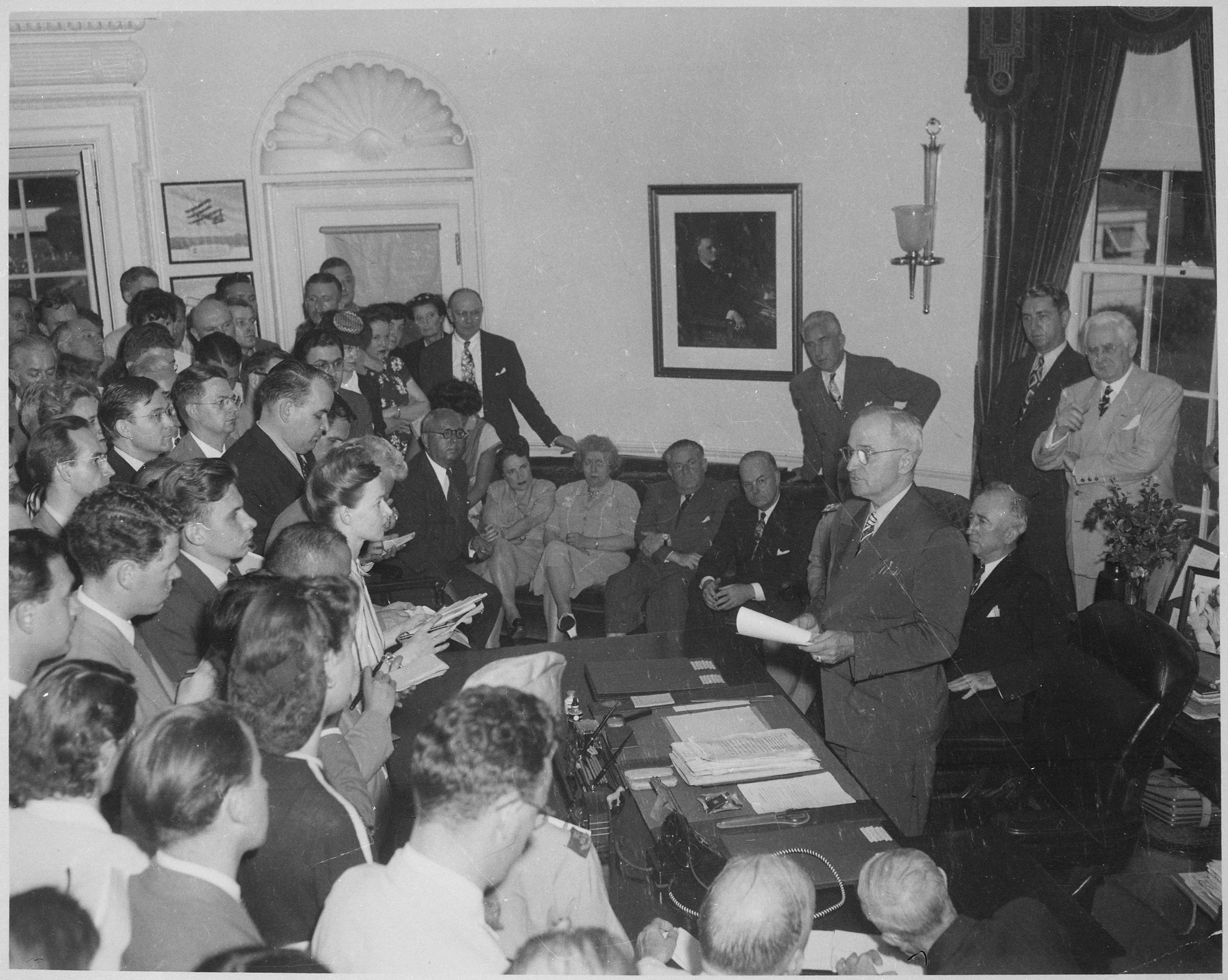
Truman announces Japan's surrender. Washington, DC, August 14, 1945

In August 1945, the Japanese government ignored surrender demands as specified in the Potsdam Declaration. With the support of most of his aides, Truman approved the schedule of the military's plans to drop atomic bombs on the Japanese cities of Hiroshima and Nagasaki. Hiroshima was bombed on August 6, and Nagasaki three days later, leaving approximately 135,000 dead; another 130,000 would die from radiation sickness and other bomb-related illnesses in the following five years. After the Soviet Union invaded Manchuria, Japan agreed to surrender on August 10 on the sole condition that Emperor Hirohito would not be forced to abdicate; after some internal debate, the Truman administration accepted these terms of surrender.

The decision to drop atomic bombs on Hiroshima and Nagasaki provoked long-running debates. Supporters of the bombings argue that, given the tenacious Japanese defense of the outlying islands, the bombings saved hundreds of thousands of lives that would have been lost invading mainland Japan. After leaving office, Truman told a journalist that the atomic bombing "was done to save 125,000 youngsters on the American side and 125,000 on the Japanese side from getting killed and that is what it did. It probably also saved a half million youngsters on both sides from being maimed for life." Truman was also motivated by a desire to end the war before the Soviet Union could invade Japanese-held territories and set up Communist governments. Critics, such as Allied commander and Truman's successor Dwight D. Eisenhower, have argued that the use of nuclear weapons was unnecessary, given that conventional tactics such as firebombing and blockade might induce Japan's surrender without the need for such weapons.

== Foreign affairs ==
=== Postwar international order ===
==== United Nations ====
In his last years in office Roosevelt had promoted several major initiatives to reshape the postwar politics and economy, and avoid the mistakes of 1919. Chief among those organizations was the United Nations, an intergovernmental organization similar to the League of Nations that was designed to help ensure international cooperation. When Truman took office, delegates were about to meet at the United Nations Conference on International Organization in San Francisco. As a Wilsonian internationalist, Truman strongly supported the creation of the United Nations, and he signed the United Nations Charter at the San Francisco Conference. Truman did not repeat Woodrow Wilson's partisan attempt to ratify the Treaty of Versailles in 1919. Instead he cooperated closely with Senator Arthur H. Vandenberg and other Republican leaders to ensure ratification. Cooperation with Vandenberg, a leading figure on the Senate Foreign Relations Committee, proved crucial for Truman's foreign policy, especially after Republicans gained control of Congress in the 1946 elections. Construction of the United Nations headquarters in New York City was funded by the Rockefeller Foundation and completed in 1952.

==== Trade and low tariffs ====
In 1934, Congress had passed the Reciprocal Tariff Act, giving the president an unprecedented amount of authority in setting tariff rates. The act allowed for the creation of reciprocal agreements in which the U.S. and other countries mutually agreed to lower tariff rates. Despite significant opposition from those who favored higher tariffs, Truman was able to win legislative extension of the reciprocity program, and his administration reached numerous bilateral agreements that lowered trade barriers. The Truman administration also sought to further lower global tariff rates by engaging in multilateral trade negotiations, and the State Department proposed the establishment of the International Trade Organization (ITO). The ITO was designed to have broad powers to regulate trade among member countries, and its charter was approved by the United Nations in 1948. However, the ITO's broad powers engendered opposition in Congress, and Truman declined to send the charter to the Senate for ratification. In the course of creating the ITO, the U.S. and 22 other countries signed the General Agreement on Tariffs and Trade (GATT), a set of principles governing trade policy. Under the terms of the agreement, each country agreed to reduce overall tariff rates and to treat each co-signatory as a "most favoured nation," meaning that no non-signatory country could benefit from more advantageous tariff rates. Due to a combination of the Reciprocal Tariff Act, the GATT, and inflation, U.S. tariff rates fell dramatically between the passage of the Smoot–Hawley Tariff Act in 1930 and the end of the Truman administration in 1953.

==== European refugees ====
World War II left millions of refugees displaced in Europe, especially former prisoners and forced laborers in Germany. Truman took a leadership role in meeting the challenge. He backed the new International Refugee Organization (IRO), a temporary international organization that helped resettle refugees. The United States also funded temporary camps and admitted large numbers of refugees as permanent residents. Truman obtained ample funding from Congress for the Displaced Persons Act of 1948, which allowed many of the displaced people of World War II to immigrate into the United States. Of the approximately one million people resettled by the IRO, more than 400,000 settled in the United States. The most contentious issue facing the IRO was the resettlement of European Jews, many of whom, with the support of Truman, were allowed to immigrate to British-controlled Mandatory Palestine. The administration also helped create a new category of refugee, the "escapee," at the 1951 Geneva Convention Relating to the Status of Refugees. The American Escapee Program began in 1952 to help the flight and relocation of political refugees from communism in Eastern Europe. The motivation for the refugee and escapee programs was twofold: humanitarianism, and use as a political weapon against inhumane communism. Truman also set up a Presidential Displaced Person Commission, which people such as Harry N. Rosenfield and Walter Bierlinger served on.

==== Atomic energy and nuclear weapons ====
In March 1946, at an optimistic moment for postwar cooperation, the administration released the Acheson-Lilienthal Report, which proposed that all nations voluntarily abstain from constructing nuclear weapons. As part of the proposal, the U.S. would dismantle its nuclear program once all other countries agreed not to develop or otherwise acquire nuclear weapons. Fearing that Congress would reject the proposal, Truman turned to the well-connected Bernard Baruch to represent the U.S. position to the United Nations. The Baruch Plan, largely based on the Acheson-Lilienthal Report, was not adopted due to opposition from Congress and the Soviet Union. The Soviet Union would develop its own nuclear arsenal, testing a nuclear weapon for the first time in August 1949.

The United States Atomic Energy Commission, directed by David E. Lilienthal until 1950, was in charge of designing and building nuclear weapons under a policy of full civilian control. The U.S. had only 9 atomic bombs in 1946, but the stockpile grew to 650 by 1951. Lilienthal wanted to give high priority to peaceful uses for nuclear technology, especially nuclear power plants, but coal was cheap and the power industry was largely uninterested in building nuclear power plants during the Truman administration. Construction of the first nuclear plant would not begin until 1954.

The Soviet Union's successful test of an atomic bomb in 1949 triggered an intense debate over whether the United States should proceed with development of the much more powerful hydrogen bomb. There was opposition to the idea from many in the scientific community and from some government officials, but Truman believed that the Soviet Union would likely develop the weapon itself and was unwilling to allow the Soviets to have such an advantage. Thus in early 1950, Truman made the decision to go forward with the H-bomb. The first test of thermonuclear weaponry was conducted by the United States in 1952; the Soviet Union would perform its own thermonuclear test in August 1953.

=== Beginning of the Cold War, 1945–1949 ===
==== Escalating tensions, 1945–1946 ====
Following World War II, the United States, France, Britain, and the Soviet Union each took control of occupation zones in Germany and the German capital of Berlin

The Second World War dramatically upended the international system, as formerly-powerful nations like Germany, France, Japan, and even the USSR and Britain had been devastated. At the end of the war, only the United States and the Soviet Union had the ability to exercise influence, and a bipolar international power structure replaced the multipolar structure of the Interwar period. On taking office, Truman privately viewed the Soviet Union as a "police government pure and simple," but he was initially reluctant to take a hard-line towards it, as he hoped to work with Stalin the aftermath of Second World War. Truman's suspicions deepened as the Soviets consolidated their control in Eastern Europe throughout 1945, and the February 1946 announcement of the Soviet five-year plan further strained relations as it called for the continuing build-up of the Soviet military. At the December 1945 Moscow Conference, Secretary of State Byrnes agreed to recognize the pro-Soviet governments in the Balkans, while the Soviet leadership accepted U.S. leadership in the occupation of Japan. U.S. concessions at the conference angered other members of the Truman administration, including Truman himself. By the beginning of 1946, it had become clear to Truman that Britain and the United States would have little influence in Soviet-dominated Eastern Europe.

Henry Wallace, Eleanor Roosevelt, and many other prominent New Dealers continued to hope for cooperative relations with the Soviet Union. Some liberals, like Reinhold Niebuhr, distrusted the Soviet Union but believed that the United States should not try to counter Soviet influence in Eastern Europe, which the Soviets saw as their "strategic security belt." Partly because of this sentiment, Truman was reluctant to fully break with the Soviet Union in early 1946, but he took an increasingly hard line towards the Soviet Union throughout the year. He privately approved of Winston Churchill's March 1946 "Iron Curtain" speech, which urged the United States to take the lead of an anti-Soviet alliance, though he did not publicly endorse it.

Throughout 1946, tensions arose between the United States and the Soviet Union in places like Iran, which the Soviets had partly occupied during World War II. Pressure from the U.S. and the United Nations finally forced the withdrawal of Soviet soldiers. Turkey also emerged as a point of contention, as the Soviet Union demanded joint control over the Dardanelles and the Bosphorus, key straits that controlled movement between the Black Sea and the Mediterranean Sea. The U.S. forcefully opposed this proposed alteration to the 1936 Montreux Convention, which had granted Turkey sole control over the straits, and Truman dispatched a fleet to the Eastern Mediterranean to show his administration's commitment to the region. Moscow and Washington also argued over Germany, which had been divided into four occupation zones. In the September 1946 Stuttgart speech, Secretary of State Byrnes announced that the United States would no longer seek reparations from Germany and would support the establishment of a democratic state. The United States, France, and Britain agreed to combine their occupation zones, eventually forming West Germany. In East Asia, Truman denied the Soviet request to reunify Korea, and refused to allow the Soviets (or any other country) a role in the post-war occupation of Japan.

By September 1946, Truman was convinced that the Soviet Union sought world domination and that cooperation was futile. He adopted a policy of containment, based on a 1946 cable by diplomat George F. Kennan. Containment, a policy of preventing the further expansion of Soviet influence, represented a middle-ground position between friendly detente (as represented by Wallace), and aggressive rollback to regain territory already lost to Communism, as would be adopted in 1981 by Ronald Reagan. Kennan's doctrine was based on the notion that the Soviet Union was led by an uncompromising totalitarian regime, and that the Soviets were primarily responsible for escalating tensions. Wallace, who had been appointed Secretary of Commerce after the 1944 election, resigned from the cabinet in September 1946 due to Truman's hardening stance towards the Soviet Union.

==== Truman Doctrine ====
In the first major step in implementing containment, Truman extended money to Greece and Turkey to prevent the spread of Soviet-aligned governments. Prior to 1947, the U.S. had largely ignored Greece, which had an anti-communist government, because it was under British influence. Since 1944, the British had assisted the Greek government against a left-wing insurgency, but in early 1947 the British informed the United States that they could no longer afford to intervene in Greece. At the urging of Acheson, who warned that the fall of Greece could lead to the expansion of Soviet influence throughout Europe, Truman requested that Congress grant an unprecedented $400 million aid package to Greece and Turkey. In a March 1947 speech before a joint session of Congress, Truman articulated the Truman Doctrine, which called for the United States to support "free people who are resisting attempted subjugation by armed minorities or by outside pressures." Overcoming those who opposed U.S. involvement in Greek affairs, as well those who feared that the aid would weaken post-war cooperation, Truman won bipartisan approval of the aid package. The congressional vote represented a permanent break with the non-interventionism that had characterized U.S. foreign policy prior to World War II.

The United States supported the government against the communists in the Greek Civil War, but did not send any military force. The insurgency was defeated in 1949. Stalin and Yugoslavian leader Josip Broz Tito both provided aid to the insurgents, but a dispute over the aid led to the start of a split in the Communist bloc. American military and economic aid to Turkey also proved effective, and Turkey avoided a civil war. The Truman administration also provided aid to the Italian government in advance of the 1948 general election. The aid package, combined with a covert CIA operation, anti-Communist mobilization by the Catholic Church, and pressure from prominent Italian-Americans, helped to ensure a Communist defeat in the election. The initiatives of the Truman Doctrine solidified the post-war division between the United States and the Soviet Union, and the Soviet Union responded by tightening its control over Eastern Europe. Countries aligned with the Soviet Union became known as the Eastern Bloc, while the U.S. and its allies became known as the Western Bloc.

==== Military reorganization and budgets ====
U.S. military spending
Fiscal Year	% GNP
1945	38%
1946	21%
1948	5.0%
1950	4.6%
1952	13%

Learning from wartime organizational problems, the Truman administration reorganized the military and intelligence establishment to provide for more centralized control and reduce rivalries. The National Security Act of 1947 combined and reorganized all military forces by merging the Department of War and the Department of the Navy into the National Military Establishment (which was later renamed as the Department of Defense). The law also created the U.S. Air Force, the Central Intelligence Agency (CIA), and the National Security Council (NSC). The CIA and the NSC were designed to be non-military, advisory bodies that would increase U.S. preparation against foreign threats without assuming the domestic functions of the Federal Bureau of Investigation. The National Security Act institutionalized the Joint Chiefs of Staff, which had been established on a temporary basis during World War II. The Joint Chiefs of Staff took charge of all military action, and the Secretary of Defense became the chief presidential adviser on military matter. In 1952, Truman secretly consolidated and empowered the cryptologic elements of the United States by creating the National Security Agency (NSA). Truman and Marshall also sought to require one year of military service for all young men, but this proposal failed as it never won more than modest support among members of Congress.

Truman had hoped that the National Security Act would minimize interservice rivalries, but each branch retained considerable autonomy and battles over the military budgets and other issues continued. In 1949, Secretary of Defense Louis Johnson announced that he would cancel a so-called "supercarrier," which many in the navy saw as an important part of the service's future. The cancellation sparked a crisis known as the "Revolt of the Admirals", when a number of retired and active-duty admirals publicly disagreed with the Truman administration's emphasis on less expensive strategic atomic bombs delivered by the air force. During congressional hearings, public opinion shifted strongly against the navy, which ultimately kept control of marine aviation but lost control over strategic bombing. Military budgets following the hearings prioritized the development of air force heavy bomber designs, and the United States accumulated a combat ready force of over 1,000 long-range strategic bombers capable of supporting nuclear mission scenarios.

Following the end of World War II, Truman gave a low priority to defense budgets—he was interested in curtailing military expenditures and had priorities he wanted to address with domestic spending. From the beginning, he assumed that the American monopoly on the atomic bomb was adequate protection against any and all external threats. Military spending plunged from 39 percent of GNP in 1945 to only 5 percent in 1948, but defense expenditures overall were still eight times higher in constant dollars than they had been before the war. The number of military personnel fell from just over 3 million in 1946 to approximately 1.6 million in 1947, although again the number of military personnel was still nearly five times larger than that of U.S. military in 1939. These jumps were considerably larger than had taken place before and after the Spanish–American War or before and after World War I, indicating that something fundamental had changed regarding American defense posture. Paired with the aforementioned decision to go ahead with the H-bomb, Truman ordered a review of U.S. military policies as they related to foreign policy planning. The National Security Council drafted NSC 68, which called for a major expansion of the U.S. defense budget, increased aid to U.S. allies, and a more aggressive posture in the Cold War. Despite increasing Cold War tensions, Truman dismissed the document, as he was unwilling to commit to higher defense spending. The Korean War convinced Truman of the necessity for higher defense spending, and such spending would soar between 1949 and 1953.

==== Marshall Plan ====
Marshall Plan expenditures by country

The United States had terminated the war-time Lend-Lease program in August 1945, but it continue a program of loans to Britain. Furthermore, the U.S. sent massive shipments of food to Europe in the years immediately following the end of the war. With the goal of stemming the spread of Communism and increasing trade between the U.S. and Europe, the Truman administration devised the Marshall Plan, which sought to rejuvenate the devastated economies of Western Europe. To fund the Marshall Plan, Truman asked Congress to approve an unprecedented, multi-year, $25 billion appropriation.

Congress, under the control of conservative Republicans, agreed to fund the program for multiple reasons. The conservative isolationist wing of the Republican Party, led by Senator Kenneth S. Wherry, argued that the Marshall Plan would be "a wasteful 'operation rat-hole'". Wherry held that it made no sense to oppose communism by supporting the socialist governments in Western Europe and that American goods would reach Russia and increase its war potential. Wherry was outmaneuvered by the emerging internationalist wing in the Republican Party, led by Senator Arthur H. Vandenberg. With support from Republican Senator Henry Cabot Lodge Jr., Vandenberg admitted there was no certainty that the plan would succeed, but said it would halt economic chaos, sustain Western civilization, and stop further Soviet expansion. Both houses of Congress approved of the initial appropriation, known as the Foreign Assistance Act, by large majorities, and Truman signed the act into law in April 1948. Congress would eventually allocate $12.4 billion in aid over the four years of the plan.

In addition to aid, the Marshall Plan also focused on efficiency along the lines of American industry and removing tariffs and trade barriers. Though the United States allowed each recipient to develop its own plan for the aid, it set several rules and guidelines on the use of the funding. Governments were required to exclude Communists, socialist policies were discouraged, and balanced budgets were favored. Additionally, the United States conditioned aid to the French and British on their acceptance of the reindustrialization of Germany and support for European integration. To avoid exacerbating tensions, the U.S. invited the Soviet Union to become a recipient in the program, but set terms that Stalin was likely to reject. The Soviet Union refused to consider joining the program and vetoed participation by its own satellites. The Soviets set up their own program for aid, the Molotov Plan, and the competing plans resulted in reduced trade between the Eastern bloc and the Western bloc.

The Marshall Plan helped European economies recover in the late 1940s and early 1950s. By 1952, industrial productivity had increased by 35 percent compared to 1938 levels. The Marshall Plan also provided critical psychological reassurance to many Europeans, restoring optimism to a war-torn continent. Though European countries did not adopt American economic structures and ideas to the degree hoped for by some Americans, they remained firmly rooted in mixed economic systems. The European integration process led to the creation of the European Economic Community, which eventually formed the basis of the European Union.

==== Berlin airlift ====
In reaction to Western moves aimed at reindustrializing their German occupation zones, Stalin ordered a blockade of the Western-held sectors of Berlin, which was deep in the Soviet occupation zone. Stalin hoped to prevent the creation of a western German state aligned with the U.S., or, failing that, to consolidate control over eastern Germany. After the blockade began on June 24, 1948, the commander of the American occupation zone in Germany, General Lucius D. Clay, proposed sending a large armored column across the Soviet zone to West Berlin with instructions to defend itself if it were stopped or attacked. Truman believed this would entail an unacceptable risk of war, and instead approved Ernest Bevin's plan to supply the blockaded city by air. On June 25, the Allies initiated the Berlin Airlift, a campaign that delivered food and other supplies, such as coal, using military aircraft on a massive scale. Nothing like it had ever been attempted before, and no single nation had the capability, either logistically or materially, to accomplish it. The airlift worked, and ground access was again granted on May 11, 1949. The Berlin Airlift was one of Truman's great foreign policy successes, and it significantly aided his election campaign in 1948.

==== NATO ====
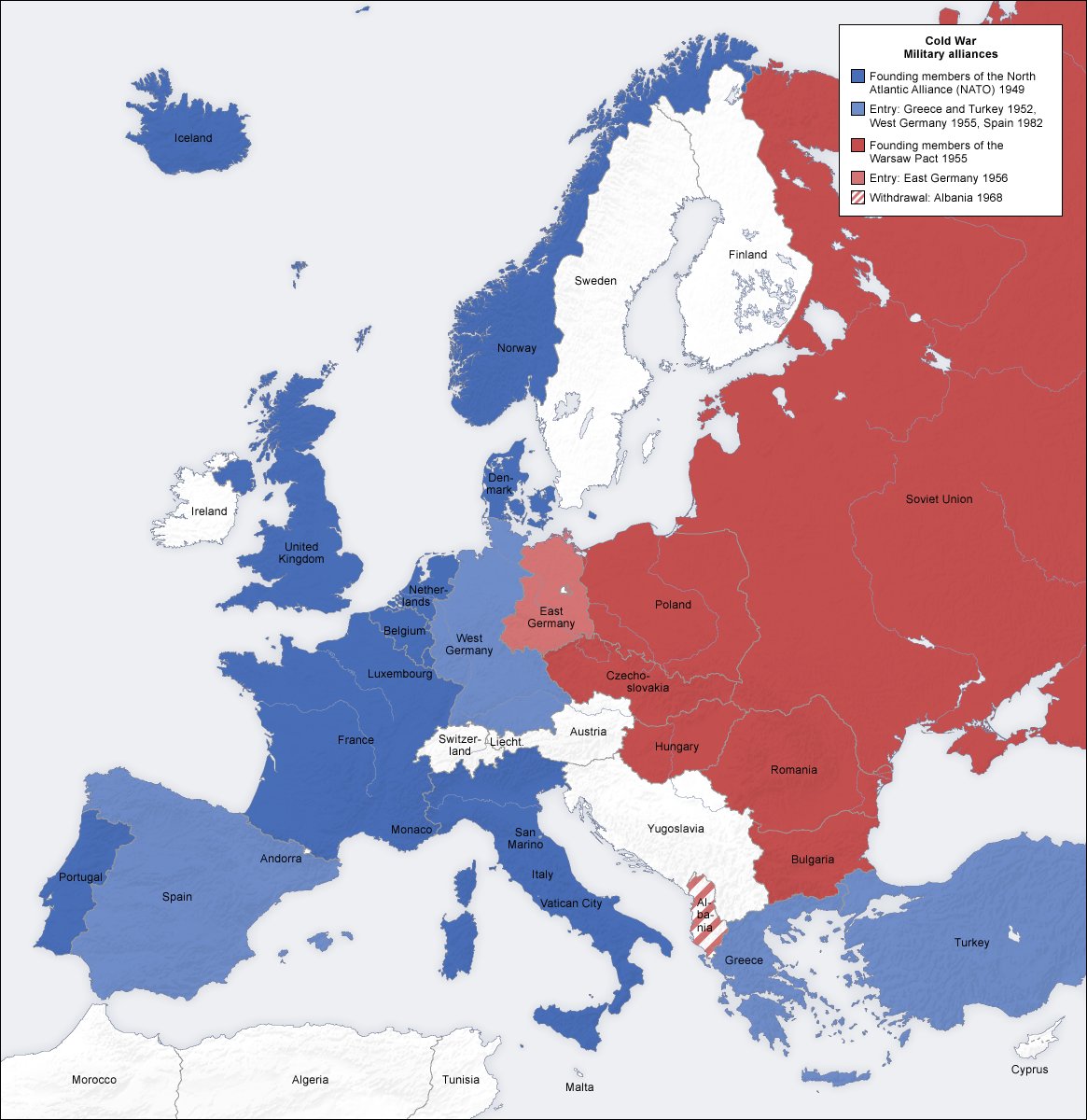
Map of NATO and the Warsaw Pact (which was created in 1955). The original NATO members are shaded dark blue.

Rising tensions with the Soviets, along with the Soviet veto of numerous United Nations Resolutions, convinced Truman, Senator Vandenberg, and other American leaders of the necessity of creating a defensive alliance devoted to collective security. In 1949, the United States, Canada, and several European countries signed the North Atlantic Treaty, creating a trans-Atlantic military alliance and committing the United States to its first permanent alliance since the 1778 Treaty of Alliance with France. The treaty establishing NATO was widely popular and easily passed the Senate in 1949. NATO's goals were to contain Soviet expansion in Europe and to send a clear message to communist leaders that the world's democracies were willing and able to build new security structures in support of democratic ideals. The treaty also re-assured France that the United States would come to its defense, paving the way for continuing French cooperation in the re-establishment of an independent German state. The United States, United Kingdom, France, Italy, the Netherlands, Belgium, Luxembourg, Norway, Denmark, Portugal, Iceland, and Canada were the original treaty signatories. Shortly after the creation of NATO, Truman convinced Congress to pass the Mutual Defense Assistance Act, which created a military aid program for European allies.

Cold War tensions heightened following Soviet acquisition of nuclear weapons and the beginning of the Korean War. The United States increased its commitment to NATO, invited Greece and Turkey to join the alliance, and launched a second major foreign aid program with the enactment of the Mutual Security Act. Truman permanently stationed 180,000 in Europe, and European defense spending grew from 5 percent to 12 percent of gross national product. NATO established a unified command structure, and Truman appointed General Dwight D. Eisenhower as the first Supreme Commander of NATO. West Germany, which fell under the aegis of NATO, would eventually be incorporated into NATO in 1955.

=== Latin America and Argentina ===
Cold War tensions and competition reached across the globe, affecting Europe, Asia, North America, Latin America, and Africa. The United States had historically focused its foreign policy on upholding the Monroe Doctrine in the Western Hemisphere, but new commitments in Europe and Asia diminished Washington's attentions there. Partially in reaction to fears of expanding Soviet influence, the U.S. led efforts to create collective security pact in the Western Hemisphere. In 1947, the United States and most Latin American nations joined the Rio Pact, a defensive military alliance. The following year, the independent states of the Americas formed the Organization of American States (OAS), an intergovernmental organization designed to foster regional unity. Many Latin American nations, seeking favor with the United States, cut off relations with the Soviet Union. Latin American countries also requested aid and investment similar to the Marshall Plan, but Truman believed that most U.S. foreign aid was best directed to Europe and other areas that could potentially fall under the influence of Communism.

There was bad blood with Argentina. Washington detested dictator Juan Peron, who held fascist sympathies, tried to remain neutral in the Cold War and continued to harbor Nazi war criminals. Washington blocked funds from international agencies and restricted trade and investment opportunities.

=== Asia ===
==== Recognition of Israel ====
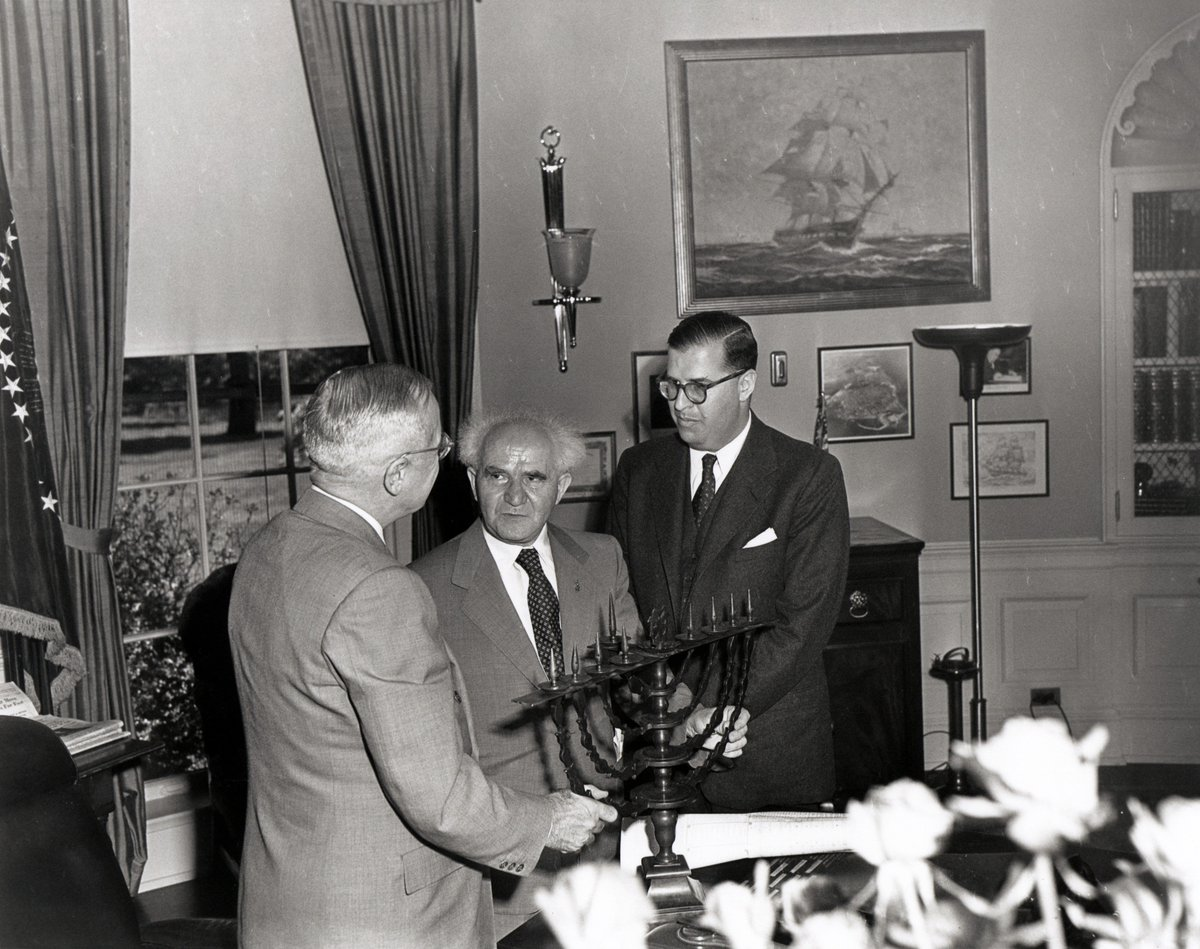
President Truman in the Oval Office, receiving a Hanukkah Menorah from the Prime Minister of Israel, David Ben-Gurion (center). To the right is Abba Eban, Ambassador of Israel to the U.S.

Truman had long taken an interest in the history of the Middle East, and was sympathetic to Jews who sought a homeland in British-controlled Mandatory Palestine. In 1943, he had called for a homeland for those Jews who survived the Nazi regime. However, State Department officials were reluctant to offend the Arabs, who were opposed to the establishment of a Jewish state in the region. Regarding policy in the Eastern Mediterranean and the Middle East, Palestine was secondary to the goal of protecting the "Northern Tier" of Greece, Turkey, and Iran from communism. In 1947, the United Nations approved the partition of Mandatory Palestine into a Jewish state (which would become known as Israel) and an Arab state. In the months leading up to the British withdrawal from the region, the Truman administration debated whether or not to recognize the fledgling state of Israel. Overcoming initial objections from Marshall, Clark Clifford convinced Truman that non-recognition would lead Israel to tilt towards the Soviet Union in the Cold War. Truman recognized the State of Israel on May 14, 1948, eleven minutes after it declared itself a nation. Israel would secure its independence with a victory in the 1948 Arab–Israeli War, but the Arab–Israeli conflict remains unresolved.

==== China ====
In 1945, China descended into a civil war. The civil war baffled Washington, as both the Nationalists under Chiang Kai-shek and the Communists under Mao Zedong had American advocates. Truman sent George Marshall to China in early 1946 to broker a compromise featuring a coalition government, but Marshall failed. He returned to Washington in December 1946, blaming extremist elements on both sides. Though the Nationalists held a numerical advantage in the aftermath of the war, the Communists gained the upper hand in the civil war after 1947. Corruption, poor economic conditions, and poor military leadership eroded popular support for the Nationalist government, and the Communists won many peasants to their side. As the Nationalists collapsed in 1948, the Truman administration faced the question of whether to intervene on the side of the Nationalists or seek good relations with Mao. Chiang's strong support among sections of the American public, along with desire to assure other allies that the U.S. was committed to containment, convinced Truman to increase economic and military aid to the Nationalists. However, Truman held out little hope for a Nationalist victory, and he refused to send U.S. soldiers.

Mao Zedong and his Communists took control of the mainland of China in 1949, driving the Nationalists to Taiwan. The United States had a new enemy in Asia, and Truman came under fire from conservatives for "losing" China. Along with the Soviet detonation of a nuclear weapon, the Communist victory in the Chinese Civil War played a major role in escalating Cold War tensions and U.S. militarization during 1949. Truman would have been willing to maintain some relationship between the U.S. and the Communist government, but Mao was unwilling. Chiang established the Republic of China on Taiwan. Truman made sure it retained China's permanent seat on the UN Security Council. (Note: For the historiography see Brazinsky, Gregg (2012). "The Birth of a Rivalry: Sino-American Relations during the Truman Administration". In Margolies, Daniel S. (ed.). A Companion to Harry S. Truman. pp. 484–497.) In June 1950, after the outbreak of fighting in Korea, Truman ordered the Navy's Seventh Fleet into the Taiwan Strait to prevent further conflict between the communist government and the Republic of China.

==== Japan ====
Under the leadership of General Douglas MacArthur, the U.S. occupied Japan after the latter's surrender in August 1945. MacArthur presided over extensive reforms of the Japanese government and society that in many ways resembled the New Deal. He imposed a new constitution that established a parliamentary democracy and granted women the right to vote. He also democratized the Japanese educational system, enabled labor unions and oversaw major economic changes, although Japanese business leaders were able to resist the reforms to some degree. As the Cold War intensified in 1947, Washington officials took greater control over the occupation, ending Japanese reparations to the Allied Powers and prioritizing economic growth over long-term reform. The Japanese suffered from poor economic conditions until 1950 when heavy American spending on supplies to support the Korean War stimulated growth. In 1951, the United States and Japan signed the Treaty of San Francisco, which restored Japanese sovereignty but allowed the United States to maintain bases in Japan. Over the opposition of the Soviet Union and some other adversaries of Japan in World War II, the peace treaty did not contain punitive measures such as reparations, though Japan did lose control of the Kuril Islands and all its pre-war possessions.

==== Southeast Asia ====
With the end of World War II, the United States fulfilled the commitment made by the 1934 Tydings–McDuffie Act and granted independence to the Philippines. The U.S. had encouraged decolonization throughout World War II, but the start of the Cold War changed priorities. The U.S. used the Marshall Plan to pressure the Dutch to grant independence to Indonesia under the leadership of the anti-Communist Sukarno, and the Dutch recognized Indonesia's independence in 1949. However, in French Indochina, the Truman administration recognized the French client state led by Emperor Bảo Đại. The U.S. feared alienating the French, who occupied a crucial position on the continent, and feared that the withdrawal of the French would allow the Communist faction of Ho Chi Minh to assume power. Despite initial reluctance to become involved in Indochina, by 1952, the United States was heavily subsidizing the French suppression of Ho's Việt Minh in the First Indochina War. The U.S. also established alliances in the region through the creation of the Mutual Defense Treaty with the Philippines and the ANZUS pact with Australia and New Zealand.

=== Korean War ===
==== Outbreak of the war ====
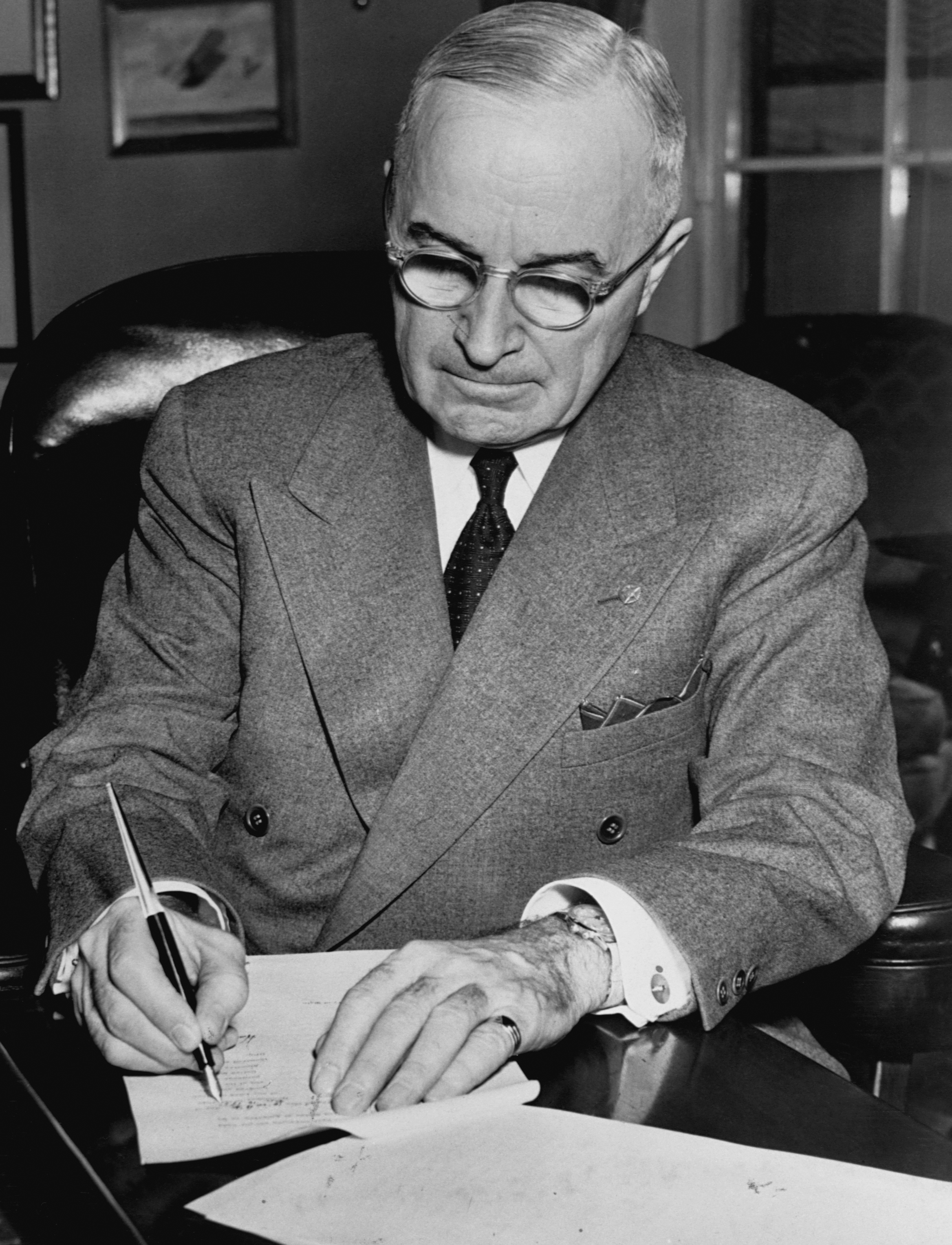
President Truman signing a proclamation declaring a national emergency and authorizing U.S. entry into the Korean War

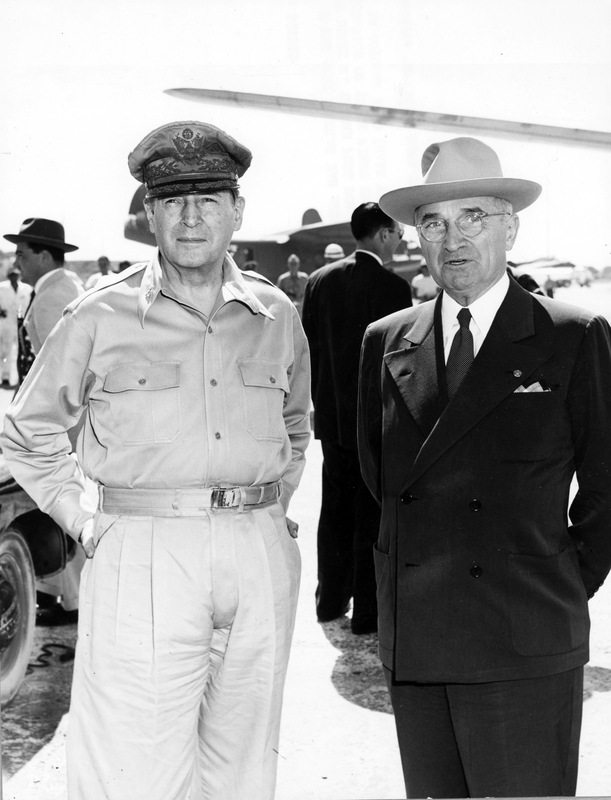
President Truman (right) and General Douglas MacArthur at Wake Island, October 1950

Following World War II, the United States and the Soviet Union occupied Korea, which had been a colony of the Japanese Empire. The 38th parallel was chosen as a line of partition between the occupying powers since it was approximately halfway between Korea's northernmost and southernmost regions, and was always intended to mark a temporary separation before the eventual reunification of Korea. Nonetheless, the Soviet Union established the Democratic People's Republic of Korea (North Korea) in 1948, while the United States established the Republic of Korea (South Korea) that same year. Hoping to avoid a long-term military commitment in the region, Truman withdrew U.S. soldiers from the Korean Peninsula in 1949. The Soviet Union also withdrew their soldiers from Korea in 1949, but continued to supply North Korea with military aid.

On June 25, 1950, Kim Il Sung's Korean People's Army invaded South Korea, starting the Korean War. In the early weeks of the war, the North Koreans easily pushed back their southern counterparts. The Soviet Union was not directly involved, though Kim did win Stalin's approval before launching the invasion. Truman, meanwhile, did not view Korea itself as a vital region in the Cold War, but he believed that allowing a Western-aligned country to fall would embolden Communists around the world and damage his own standing at home. The top officials of the Truman administration were heavily influenced by a desire to not repeat the "appeasement" of the 1930s; Truman stated to an aide, "there's no telling what they'll do, if we don't put up a fight right now." Truman turned to the United Nations to condemn the invasion. With the Soviet Union boycotting the United Nations Security Council due to the UN's refusal to recognize the People's Republic of China, Truman won approval of Resolution 84. The resolution denounced North Korea's actions and empowered other nations to defend South Korea.

North Korean forces experienced early successes, capturing the city of Seoul on June 28. Fearing the fall of the entire peninsula, General Douglas MacArthur, commander of U.S. forces in Asia, won Truman's approval to land U.S. troops on the peninsula. Rather than asking Congress for a declaration of war, Truman argued that the UN Resolution provided the presidency the constitutional power to deploy soldiers as a "police action" under the aegis of the UN. The intervention in Korea was widely popular in the United States at the time, and Truman's July 1950 request for $10 billion was approved almost unanimously. By August 1950, U.S. troops pouring into South Korea, along with American air strikes, stabilized the front around the Pusan Perimeter. Responding to criticism over unreadiness, Truman fired Secretary of Defense Louis Johnson and replaced him with the former Secretary of State George Marshall. With UN approval, Truman decided on a "rollback" policy—conquest of North Korea. UN forces launched a counterattack, scoring a stunning surprise victory with an amphibious landing at the Battle of Inchon that trapped most of the invaders. UN forces marched north, toward the Yalu River boundary with China, with the goal of reuniting Korea under UN auspices.

==== Stalemate and dismissal of MacArthur ====
As the UN forces approached the Yalu River, the CIA and General MacArthur both expected that the Chinese would remain out of the war. Defying those predictions, Chinese People's Volunteer Army forces crossed the Yalu River in November 1950 and forced the overstretched UN soldiers to retreat. Fearing that the escalation of the war could spark a global conflict with the Soviet Union, Truman refused MacArthur's request to bomb Chinese supply bases north of the Yalu River. UN forces were pushed below the 38th parallel before the end of 1950, but, under the command of General Matthew Ridgway, the UN launched a counterattack that pushed Chinese forces back up to the 38th parallel.

Territory often changed hands early in the Korean War, until the front stabilized in 1951. • North Korean, Chinese, and Soviet forces • South Korean, U.S., Commonwealth, and United Nations forces

MacArthur made several public demands for an escalation of the war, leading to a break with Truman in late 1950 and early 1951. On April 5, House Minority Leader Joseph Martin made public a letter from MacArthur that strongly criticized Truman's handling of the Korean War and called for an expansion of the conflict against China. Truman believed that MacArthur's recommendations were wrong, but more importantly, he believed that MacArthur had overstepped his bounds in trying to make foreign and military policy, potentially endangering the civilian control of the military. After consulting with the Joint Chiefs of Staff and members of Congress, Truman decided to relieve MacArthur of his command. The dismissal of General Douglas MacArthur ignited a firestorm of outrage against Truman and support for MacArthur. Fierce criticism from virtually all quarters accused Truman of refusing to shoulder the blame for a war gone sour and blaming his generals instead. Others, including Eleanor Roosevelt, supported and applauded Truman's decision. MacArthur meanwhile returned to the U.S. to a hero's welcome, and addressed a joint session of Congress. In part due to the dismissal of MacArthur, Truman's approval mark in February 1952 stood at 22% according to Gallup polls, which was, until George W. Bush in 2008, the all-time lowest approval mark for an active American president. Though the public generally favored MacArthur over Truman immediately after MacArthur's dismissal, congressional hearings and newspaper editorials helped turn public opinion against MacArthur's advocacy for escalation.

The war remained a frustrating stalemate for two years. UN and Chinese forces fought inconclusive conflicts like the Battle of Heartbreak Ridge and the Battle of Pork Chop Hill, but neither side was able to advance far past the 38th parallel. Throughout late 1951, Truman sought a cease fire, but disputes over prisoner exchanges led to the collapse of negotiations. Of the 116,000 Chinese and Korean prisoners-of-war held by the United States, only 83,000 were willing to return to their home countries, and Truman was unwilling to forcibly return the prisoners. The Korean War ended with an armistice in 1953 after Truman left office, dividing North Korea and South Korea along a border close to the 38th parallel. Over 30,000 Americans and approximately 3 million Koreans died in the conflict. The United States maintained a permanent military presence in South Korea after the war.

=== List of international trips ===
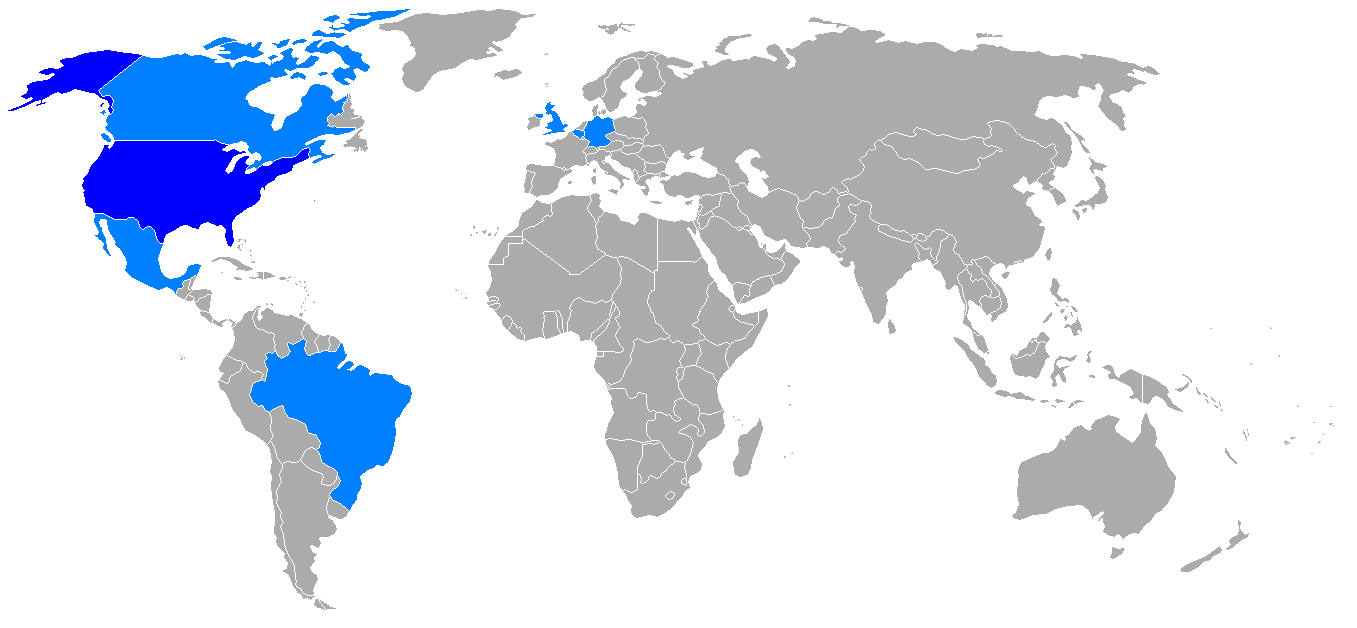
Truman made five international trips to seven countries during his presidency.

	Dates	Country	Locations	Details
1	July 15, 1945	Belgium	Antwerp, Brussels	Disembarked en route to Potsdam.
1	July 16 – August 2, 1945	Germany	Potsdam	Attended Potsdam Conference with British Prime Ministers Winston Churchill and Clement Attlee and USSR leader Joseph Stalin.
1	August 2, 1945	United Kingdom	Plymouth	Informal meeting with King George VI.
2	August 23–30, 1946	Bermuda	Hamilton	Informal visit. Met with Governor General Ralph Leatham and inspected U.S. military facilities.
3	March 3–6, 1947	Mexico	Mexico, D.F.	State visit. Met with President Miguel Alemán Valdés.
4	June 10–12, 1947	Canada	Ottawa	Official visit. Met with Governor General Harold Alexander and Prime Minister Mackenzie King and addressed Parliament.
5	September 1–7, 1947	Brazil	Rio de Janeiro	State visit. Addressed Inter-American Conference for the Maintenance of Continental Peace and Security and the Brazilian Congress.

== Domestic affairs ==
=== Reconversion and labor strife ===
Federal finances and GDP during Truman's presidency
Fiscal Year	Receipts $ Billion	Outlays $ Billion	Surplus/ Deficit	GDP	Debt as a % of GDP
1945	45.2	92.7	−47.6	226.4	103.9
1946	39.3	55.2	−15.9	228.0	106.1
1947	38.5	34.5	4.0	238.9	93.9
1948	41.6	29.8	11.8	261.9	82.6
1949	39.4	38.8	0.6	276.5	77.5
1950	39.4	42.6	−3.1	278.7	78.6
1951	51.6	45.5	6.1	327.1	65.5
1952	66.2	67.7	−1.5	357.1	60.1
1953	69.6	76.1	−6.5	382.1	57.2
Ref.					

==== Reconversion ====
Although foreign affairs dominated much of Truman's time in office, reconversion to a peacetime economy became his administration's central focus in late 1945. Truman faced several major challenges in presiding over the transition to a post-war economy, including a large national debt and persistent inflation. The United States had emerged from the Great Depression in part due to the war production that began in 1940. Most observers expected that the nation would sink into another decline with the end of the war spending. While the country had been unified in winning the war, there was no consensus on the best methods of post-war economic reconversion after the war, or the level of involvement that the federal government should have in economic affairs. Truman faced a Congress that on domestic issues was dominated by the conservative coalition, an alliance of Republicans and conservative Southern Democrats. This group opposed many of Truman's domestic policies and did not welcome strong presidential leadership. Truman asked Congress for a host of measures, including a bill that would make the Fair Employment Practice Committee a permanent institution, but his focus on foreign affairs during this period prevented him from effectively advocating for his programs with members of Congress.

Truman was particularly concerned about keeping unemployment levels low; nearly 2 million people lost jobs within days of the Japanese surrender, and he feared that even more would lose their jobs in the following months. Liberal New Dealers pushed for an explicit federal commitment to ensuring "full employment," but Congress instead passed the Employment Act of 1946. The act created the Council of Economic Advisers and mandated the federal government "to foster and promote free competitive enterprise and the general welfare... and to promote maximum employment, production, and purchasing power.

The United States had instituted price controls and wage controls during the war to avoid large-scale inflation or deflation. Within the Truman administration, some advocated lifting these controls immediately to allow private industries to hire new workers, while others feared that immediately lifting the controls would lead to runaway inflation. Truman sought to find a middle course between the two camps; price controls on many nonessential items were lifted by the end of September 1945, but others remained in place by the end of 1945. Increasingly concerned about inflation, Truman reimposed some price controls in December 1945, but the unpopularity of those controls led the administration to seek other ways to curb inflation, including cuts to federal spending. In July 1946, after average prices rose at the unprecedented rate of 5.5 percent, Truman won passage of a bill that extended his authority to institute price controls on some items. Though unemployment remained low, labor unrest, inflation, and other issues badly damaged Truman's popularity, which in turn contributed to a poor Democratic showing in the November 1946 mid-term elections. After the Republican victory in those elections, Truman announced the end of all federal wage and price controls, with the exception of rent controls.

==== Labor unrest ====
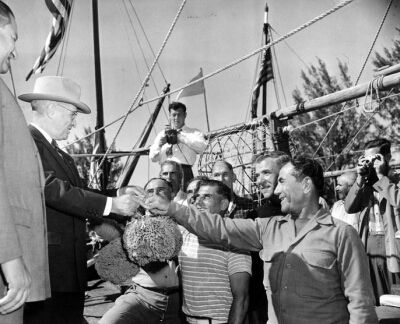
Truman with sponge divers in Florida, 1947

Conflict between management and labor presented one of the biggest challenges to the conversion of the economy to peacetime production. Organized labor had adhered to its pledge to refrain from striking during the war, but labor leaders were eager to share in the gains from a postwar economic resurgence. After several labor disputes broke out in September and October 1945, Truman convened a national conference between leaders of business and organized labor in November, at which he advocated collective bargaining to avoid labor-related economic disruptions. The conference failed to have a major impact; an unprecedented wave of major strikes affected the United States, and by February 1946 nearly 2 million workers were engaged in strikes or other labor disputes. Many of the strikes were led by John L. Lewis of the Congress of Industrial Organizations (CIO), who Truman despised.

When a national rail strike threatened in May 1946, Truman seized the railroads to continue operations, but two key railway unions struck anyway. The entire national railroad system was shut down—24,000 freight trains and 175,000 passenger trains a day stopped moving. For two days public anger mounted among the general public and Truman himself, and the president drafted a message to Congress that called on veterans to form a lynch mob and destroy the union leaders. After top aide Clark Clifford rewrote and toned down the speech, Truman delivered a speech calling for Congress to pass a new law to draft all the railroad strikers into the army. As he was concluding his speech he read a message just handed to him that the strike was settled on presidential terms; Truman nevertheless finished the speech, making clear his displeasure with the strike. Truman's speech marked the end of the strike wave, as business and labor leaders both generally avoided subsequent actions that would provoke a strong response from the administration. The strikes damaged the political standing of unions, and the real wages of blue collar workers fell by over twelve percent in the year after the surrender of Japan. At the same time, the CIO's efforts to expand massively into the South (a campaign known as "Operation Dixie") failed.

=== Higher education and veterans benefits ===
==== G.I. Bill ====
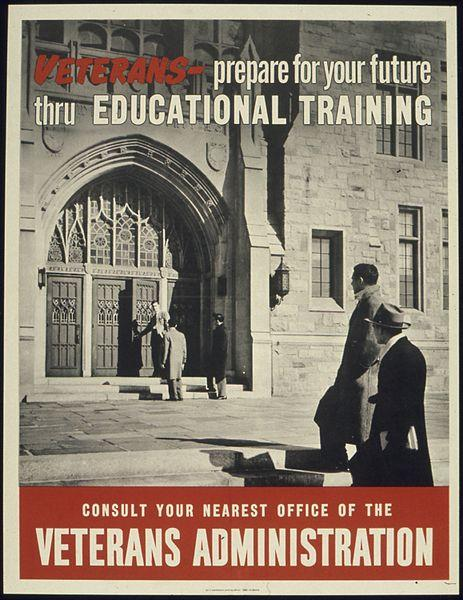
A government poster informing soldiers about the G.I. Bill

The G.I. Bill had been passed in 1944 by a conservative coalition that wanted to restrict benefits to "deserving" wartime veterans, as opposed to the larger welfare program favored by the Roosevelt administration that would reach all low income families. The most famous component of the G.I. Bill provided free collegiate, vocational, and high school education for veterans – not only free tuition, but also full housing and subsistence allowances for the veterans and their families. There was a remarkable transformation of higher education, as 2.2 million veterans crowded into hastily built classrooms. Due in large part to the G.I. Bill, the number of college degrees awarded rose from just over 200,000 in 1940 to nearly 500,000 in 1950.

The G.I. Bill also guaranteed low cost home loans for veterans, with very low down payments and low interest rates. In 1947 alone, 540,000 veterans bought a house at the average price of $7,300. Developers purchased empty land just outside the city, installed tract houses based on a handful of designs, and provided streets and utilities. The GI Bill thus helped in ensuring 15 million housing units were built between 1945 and 1955, and the home-ownership rate grew from 50 percent in 1945 to 60 percent in 1960. Together with the growth of the automobile industry, the G.I. Bill's housing benefits helped provide for a major expansion of suburbs around every major city. In addition to education and housing benefits, the bill included aid to veterans who wanted to start a small business or farm, as well one year of unemployment compensation.

==== Commission on Higher Education for American Democracy ====
Truman in 1946 established a commission on Higher Education for American Democracy which issued an influential report. It calls for several significant changes in postsecondary education, among them, the establishment of a network of public community colleges, which would be free of charge for "all youth who can profit from such education". The commission helped popularize the phrase "community college" in the late 1940s and helped shape the future of two-year degree institutions in the U.S. The report also calls for increased Federal spending in the form of scholarships, fellowships, and general aid to schools and students.

=== 80th Congress and the Taft–Hartley Act ===
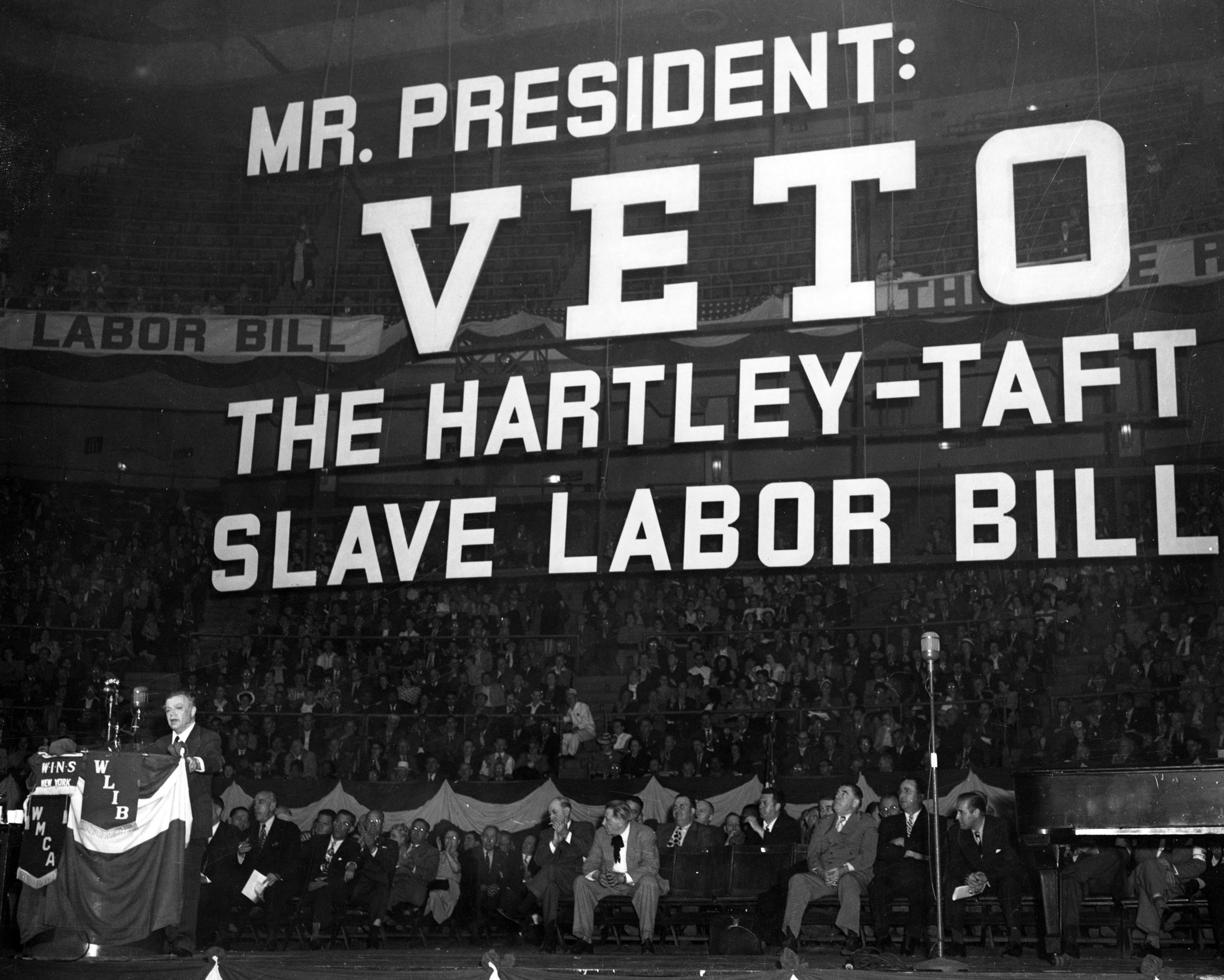
David Dubinsky of the International Ladies Garment Workers Union speaks against the Taft–Hartley Act of 1947

The 1946 mid-term election left Republicans in control of Congress for the first time since the early 1930s. Truman initially hoped to work with Republican leaders in Congress, focusing on the passage of housing programs and other potential areas of common ground. Truman and the 80th Congress were able to agree on a balanced budget, albeit one that spent less on defense and some other programs that Truman favored. Congress also assented to the creation of the Hoover Commission, which proposed a series of reorganizations to the executive branch. However, the 80th Congress proved strongly resistant to Truman's policies. One of its first major acts was to approve what would become the Twenty-second Amendment, which established presidential term limits in an implicit rebuke to Franklin Roosevelt, the only president who had ever served more than two terms. (Note: The Twenty-second Amendment limited presidents to two full terms. For the purposes of the amendment, a partial term of more than two years would count towards the term limit. The amendment was ratified by the requisite 36 states on February 27, 1951.) Congress also passed bills designed to cut taxes, weaken the Interstate Commerce Commission, and reduce the number of employees covered by Social Security, but all were vetoed by Truman in 1947. Upon returning to session in 1948, Congress passed the Revenue Act of 1948, another major tax cut; Truman again vetoed the bill, but this time his veto was overridden by Congress.

In response to the labor unrest of 1945 and 1946, Congress passed the Labor Management Relations Act of 1947, also known as the Taft–Hartley Act, which amended the National Labor Relations Act of 1935. Truman vetoed the bill, denouncing it as "slave-labor bill," but Congress overrode the veto. The Taft-Hartley Act added a list of prohibited union actions to the National Labor Relations Act of 1935 (also known as the Wagner Act), which had defined several types of employer actions as unfair labor practices. Taft-Hartley prohibited jurisdictional strikes, in which a union strikes to pressure an employer to assign particular work to the employees that union represents, and secondary boycotts and "common situs" picketing, in which unions picket, strike, or refuse to handle the goods of a business with which they have no primary dispute but which is associated with a targeted business. (Note: A later statute, the Labor Management Reporting and Disclosure Act, passed in 1959, tightened these restrictions on secondary boycotts still further.) The act also outlawed closed shops, which were contractual agreements that required an employer to hire only union members. The Taft–Hartley Act also granted states power to pass "right-to-work laws," which ban union shop shops. All union officials were required to sign an affidavit that they were not Communists or else the union would lose its federal bargaining powers guaranteed by the National Labor Relations Board.

Despite his vocal opposition to the Taft–Hartley Act, Truman used its emergency provisions a number of times to halt strikes and lockouts. Repeated union efforts to repeal or modify it always failed, and it remains in effect. Historian James T. Patterson concludes that:

By the 1950s most observers agreed that Taft-Hartley was no more disastrous for workers than the Wagner Act had been for employers. What ordinarily mattered most in labor relations was not government laws such as Taft-Hartley, but the relative power of unions and management in the economic marketplace. Where unions were strong they usually managed all right; when they were weak, new laws did them little additional harm.

=== Fair Deal ===
In his first major address to Congress after taking office, Truman articulated a liberal domestic program, but his early domestic policy was dominated by post-war reconversion. As he readied for the 1948 election, Truman made clear his identity as a Democrat in the New Deal tradition, advocating a national health care system, repeal of the Taft–Hartley Act, federal aid to education, expanded public housing programs, a higher minimum wage, more public power projects like the Tennessee Valley Authority, and a more progressive tax structure. The administration also put forth the Brannan Plan, which would have removed the government's production controls and price supports in agriculture in favor of direct payments to farmers. Taken together, Truman's proposals constituted a broad legislative agenda that came to be known as the "Fair Deal." A major difference between the New Deal and the Fair Deal was that the latter included an aggressive civil rights program, which Truman termed a moral priority. Truman's proposals were not well received by Congress, even with renewed Democratic majorities in Congress after 1948. The conservative coalition of Republicans and conservative Southern Democrats played a major role in blocking passage of the Fair Deal, but the inability of liberals to agree on the details of many programs also contributed to legislative gridlock.

Only one of the major Fair Deal bills, the Housing Act of 1949, was ever enacted. The act funded slum clearance and the construction of 810,000 units of low-income housing over a period of six years. Truman did win other victories in the 81st Congress, as the minimum wage was raised from forty cents an hour to seventy-five cents an hour, Social Security benefits for the retired were doubled, and loopholes in the Sherman Antitrust Act were closed via passage of the Celler–Kefauver Act. The 1950 mid-term elections bolstered Republicans and conservative Democrats, ending any chance of passing further Fair Deal programs. Though Truman failed to pass most of his major Fair Deal deal proposals, he did help ensure that the major New Deal programs still in operation remained intact, and in many cases, received minor improvements. The Fair Deal would later serve as an inspiration for many of the Great Society programs passed during the presidency of Lyndon B. Johnson.

==== Civil rights ====
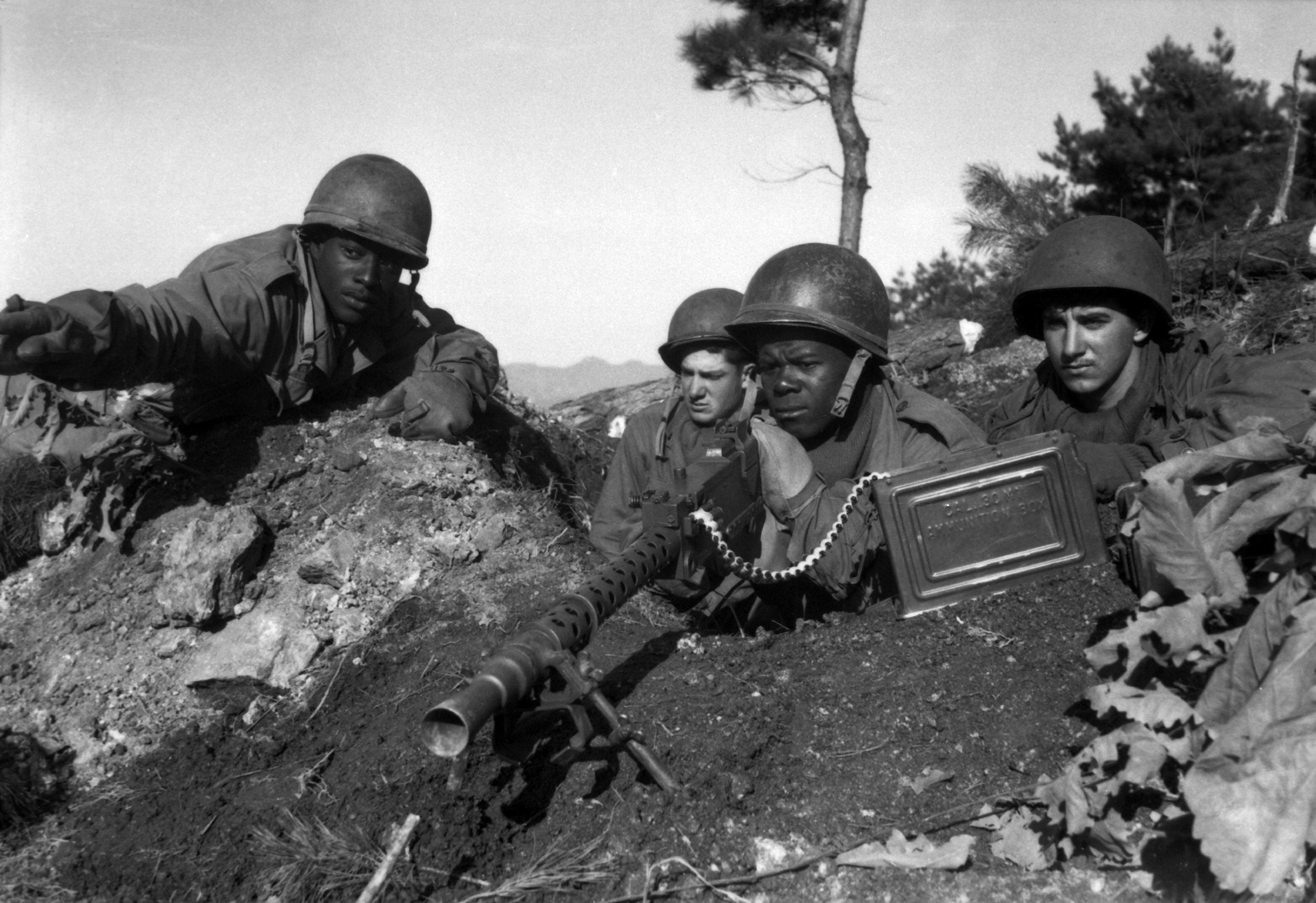
Executive Order 9981 abolished racial segregation in the U.S. armed forces. (Pictured are soldiers from the U.S. 2nd Infantry Division in action during the Korean War, November 1950)

Historians Donald R. McCoy and Richard T. Ruetten write that Truman "was the first president to have a civil rights program, the first to try to come to grips with the basic problems of minorities, and the first to condemn, vigorously and consistently, the presence of discrimination and inequality in America." A 1947 report by the President's Committee on Civil Rights titled To Secure These Rights presented a detailed ten-point agenda of civil rights reforms. In February 1948, the president submitted a civil rights agenda to Congress that proposed creating several federal offices devoted to issues such as voting rights and fair employment practices. This provoked a storm of criticism from Southern Democrats in the runup to the 1948 Democratic National Convention, but Truman refused to compromise, saying: "My forebears were Confederates ... but my very stomach turned over when I had learned that Negro soldiers, just back from overseas, were being dumped out of Army trucks in Mississippi and beaten." At the start of the 81st Congress, pro-civil rights congressmen attempted to reform the Senate's filibuster rules so that a filibuster could be defeated by a simple majority vote. Southern senators blocked this reform, thereby ensuring that civil rights would not emerge as an important legislative issue until the late 1950s.

With his civil rights agenda blocked by Congress, Truman turned to executive actions. In July 1948, he issued Executive Order 9981, requiring equal opportunity in the Armed Forces regardless of race, color, religion or national origin. Truman also issued Executive Order 9980, ending racial discrimination in the civil service of the federal government Another Executive Order, in 1951, established the Committee on Government Contract Compliance (CGCC), which sought to prevent defense contractors from discriminating because of race.

Desegregation took years, with the Air Force under Secretary Stuart Symington taking the lead. After several years of planning between Truman, the Committee on Equality of Treatment and Opportunity, and the various branches of the military, Army units started to be racially integrated in the early 1950s and later the Navy. The 1948 Women's Armed Services Integration Act allowed women to serve in the peacetime military in all-female units.

Truman appointed non-whites to unprecedented positions of power in the executive and judicial branches. Among his appointments was William Henry Hastie, the first African American to serve as a federal appellate judge. In civil rights cases like Sweatt v. Painter, the Justice Department issued amicus curiae briefs that supported ending segregation. In December 1952, the Truman administration filed an amicus curiae brief for the case of Brown v. Board of Education; two years later, the Supreme Court's holding in that case would effectively overturn the "separate but equal" doctrine that allowed for racial segregation in public education.

==== Health insurance ====
By the time Truman took office, national health insurance had been on the table for decades, but it had never gained much traction. Starting in the late 1930s hospitals promoted private insurance plans such as Blue Cross, and between 1940 and 1950, the percentage of Americans with health insurance rose from 9 percent to above 50 percent. With the support of the American Federation of Labor (AFL), Truman proposed a national health insurance plan in November 1945, but it was defeated by an alliance of conservatives, the American Medical Association (which rallied the medical community against the bill), and the business community. Many labor unions discovered they could negotiate with business to obtain better health benefits for their own members, so they focused increasingly on that goal. The failure of Truman's healthcare plan solidified the status of private employers as the primary sponsors of health insurance in the United States.

=== Crime and corruption ===
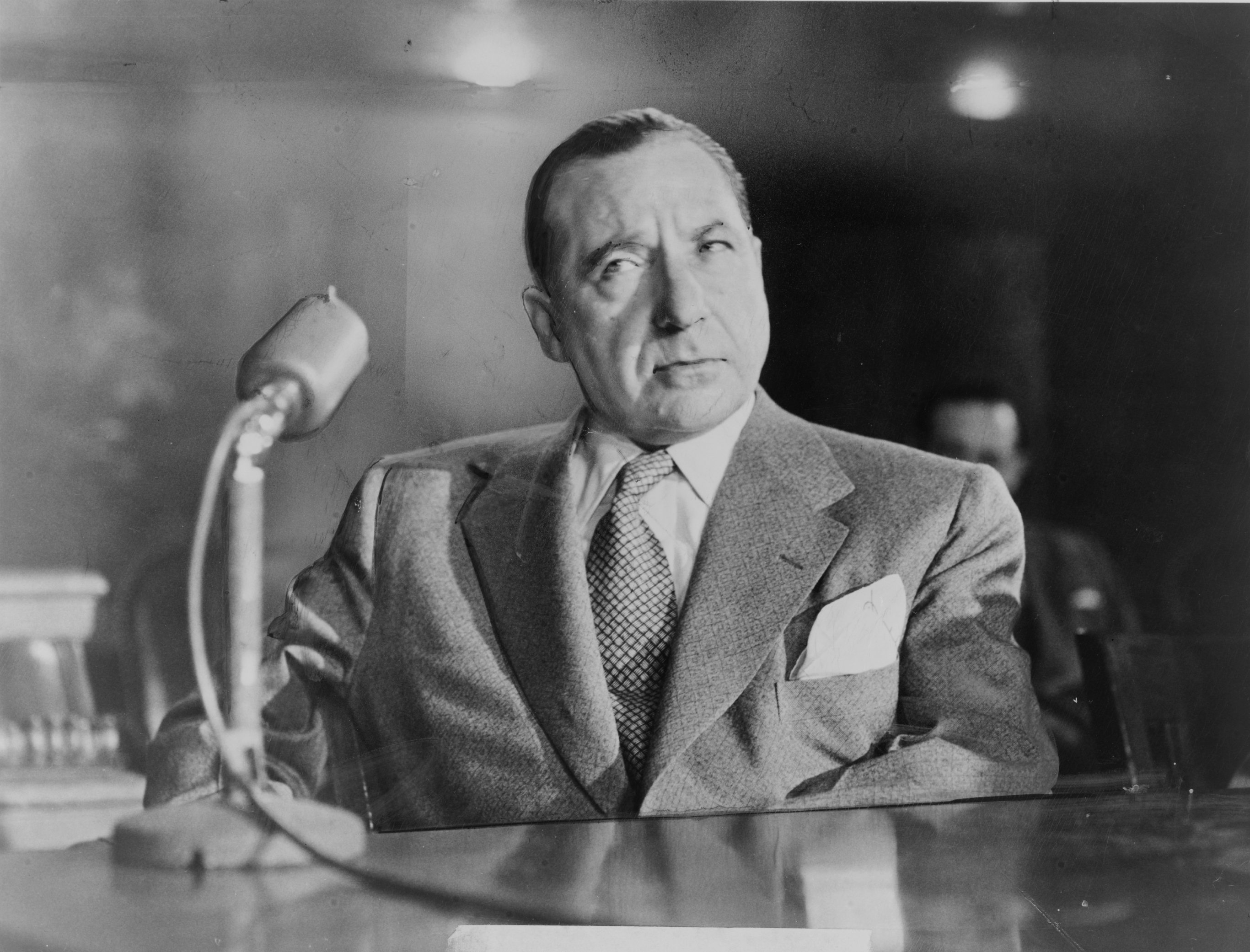
Mobster Frank Costello testifying before the Kefauver Committee.

With more young men back on the streets and more money in circulation, petty crime rates went up after 1945. Far more serious was organized crime run by professional criminal gangs, which became a favorite attack theme of Republican politicians and the media. The Justice Department in 1947 organized a 'racket squad' to build evidence for grand jury investigations in several major cities, and the income tax returns of many gambling entrepreneurs and racketeers were audited. However, federal officials were reluctant to share their new information with local law enforcement; Truman and his Attorney General J. Howard McGrath told local officials that they had to bear the chief burden in defeating organized crime. Senator Estes Kefauver, a liberal Democrat from Tennessee, launched a major Senate investigation in 1950 as chairman of the Special Committee to Investigate Organized Crime in Interstate Commerce. Kefauver, although only a freshman in the Senate, received large-scale national coverage and became a presidential contender.

The Kefauver committee exposed numerous charges of corruption among senior administration officials, some of whom received expensive fur coats and deep freezers in exchange for favors. Kefauver also found that over 160 Internal Revenue Service (IRS) officials took bribes, used their offices to run private businesses, embezzled federal funds, or tolerated corrupt behavior by their subordinates. The various scandals of organized crime did not directly touch Truman, but they highlighted and exacerbated his problems with scandals inside his administration, such as influence peddling. In 1952, Truman appointed Newbold Morris as a special prosecutor to investigate allegations of corruption at the IRS. When Attorney General McGrath fired Morris for being too zealous, Truman fired McGrath. (Note: For a narrative of all the scandals, see Donovan 1983, pp. 114–118, 332–339, 372–381.)

=== Domestic responses to the Cold War ===
==== Anticommunist liberalism ====
The onset of the Cold War produced turmoil in the left wing of the Democratic Party over foreign policy issues, especially regarding the role of the Soviet Union and the response to domestic communism. After the 1946 elections the Congress of Industrial Organizations (CIO) systematically purged communists and far-left sympathizers from leadership roles in its unions. The CIO expelled some unions that resisted the purge, notably its third-largest affiliate the United Electrical, Radio and Machine Workers of America (UE). Meanwhile, the AFL set up its first explicitly political unit, Labor's League for Political Education, and increasingly abandoned its historic tradition of nonpartisanship. Expelled leftists coalesced around Henry Wallace, who ran an independent campaign for president in 1948. The reforms by the CIO and AFL put both organizations in a good position to fight off Henry Wallace, and the CIO and AFL worked enthusiastically for Truman's reelection. Opponents of Wallace also established an anti-Communist liberal group, Americans for Democratic Action (ADA). Though often critical of the far-right's unrestrained attacks on alleged Communists, members of the ADA attacked left-wing activists who, they feared, took orders from Communist leaders in the Soviet Union.

Truman established the Temporary Commission on Employee Loyalty in November 1946 to create employee loyalty standards designed to weed out communist sympathizers from the federal workforce. In March 1947, Truman issued Executive Order 9835, which ordered purges of left-wingers who refused to disavow communism. It removed about 300 federal employees who currently were members of or associated with any organization identified by the Attorney General as communist, fascist, or totalitarian. Anti-communist liberals by 1947–48 thus played a central role in the Democratic Party, and enthusiastically supported Truman's anti-communist foreign policy.

==== Soviet espionage and McCarthyism ====
Civil libertarians and radical political activists considered the McCarran Internal Security Act (enacted it over President Truman's veto) to be a dangerous and unconstitutional infringement of political liberty, as exemplified in this 1961 poster.

In August 1948, Whittaker Chambers, a former spy for the Soviets and a senior editor at Time magazine, testified to the House Un-American Activities Committee (HUAC) that an underground communist network had been working within the U.S. government since the 1930s. He accused a former State Department official, Alger Hiss, of being a member of that network; Hiss denied the allegations but was convicted in January 1950 for perjury. The Soviet Union's success in exploding an atomic weapon in 1949 and the fall of the nationalist Chinese the same year led many Americans to conclude that subversion by Soviet spies had been responsible for American setbacks and Soviet successes, and to demand that communists be rooted out from the government and other places of influence. However, Truman did not fully share such opinions, and throughout his tenure he would balance a desire to maintain internal security against the fear that a red scare could hurt innocents and impede government operations. He famously called the Hiss trial a "red herring," but also presided over the prosecution of numerous Communist leaders under the terms of the Smith Act.

Secretary of State Acheson's public support for Hiss, the revelation that British atomic bomb scientist Klaus Fuchs was a spy, and various other events led current and former members of HUAC to decry the Truman administration, especially the State Department, as soft on communism. Republican Congressmen Karl E. Mundt of South Dakota and Richard Nixon of California emerged as particularly vocal and prominent critics on HUAC. Wisconsin Senator Joseph McCarthy used a speech in West Virginia to accuse the State Department of harboring communists, and rode the controversy to political fame. Truman responded by arguing that McCarthy's efforts would undermine the bipartisan foreign policy that had prevailed since the end of World War II and thereby give a political gift to the Soviet Union, but few Republicans spoke out against McCarthy during Truman's tenure in office. Democratic Senator William Benton sponsored a motion to expel McCarthy from Congress, but the motion was defeated and Benton lost his 1952 re-election campaign; McCarthy, meanwhile, was re-elected. McCarthy's anti-Communist campaigns, part of a larger Red Scare, played a major role in shaping a more confrontational Cold War foreign policy. It also affected members of Congress and other political leaders, who now worried that the embrace of left-wing policies would leave themselves vulnerable to accusations of being "soft" on Communism.

The outbreak of the Korean War led to renewed interest in such an internal security bill, which had previously been debated during the 80th Congress. Senator Pat McCarran of Nevada put forward a bill that would require Communist organizations to register with the government, and allowed the president to indefinitely detain those who were suspected of having engaged in espionage. The bill received little opposition from members of Congress, who feared being labeled as pro-Communist, and it passed both the House and the Senate as the McCarran Internal Security Act. Truman vetoed the bill in September 1950, arguing that it infringed on personal liberties and would be ineffective at protecting against subversion, but Congress overrode the veto.

=== Immigration ===
Immigration had been at a low level in the Great Depression and war years. It surged as the war ended, with the arrival of refugees and family members of citizens. The issue was not a high priority for the Truman administration, but there was great interest in Congress and among various ethnic groups. In 1945, the War Brides Act allowed foreign-born wives of U.S. citizens who had served in the U.S. Armed Forces to immigrate to the United States; it was later extended to include the fiancés of American soldiers. In 1946, the Luce–Celler Act extended the right to become naturalized citizens to Filipinos and Asian Indians, setting the immigration quota at 100 people per year. In 1952, the McCarran Walter Immigration Act passed over Truman's veto. It kept the quota system of the Immigration Act of 1924 but added many new opportunities for immigration from Europe and elsewhere. In practice two-thirds of the new arrivals entered outside the old quota system. Immigration law was effectively controlled by Congressman Francis E. Walter of Pennsylvania, a Democrat who wanted to minimize immigration.

=== Failed seizure of steel mills ===
Though they never reached the severity of the strike wave of 1945–1946, labor disruptions continued to affect the country after 1946. When a steel strike loomed in April 1952, Truman instructed Secretary of Commerce Charles W. Sawyer to seize and continue operations of the nation's steel mills. Truman cited his authority as Commander in Chief and the need to maintain an uninterrupted supply of steel for munitions to be used in the war in Korea. The Supreme Court found the seizure unconstitutional, and reversed the order in a major separation-of-powers decision, Youngstown Sheet & Tube Co. v. Sawyer (1952). The 6–3 decision, which held that Truman's assertion of authority was too vague and was not rooted in any legislative action by Congress, was delivered by a Court composed entirely of Justices appointed by either Truman or Roosevelt. The high court's reversal of Truman's order was his most notable legal defeat. The Supreme Court decision left the country with the possibility of a critical steel shortage, but Truman was able to convince the steel managers and organized labor to reach a settlement in July 1952.

=== Territories and dependencies ===
Truman sought to grant greater rights to the territories and dependencies of the United States. He unsuccessfully pushed for the admission of Hawaii and Alaska as states but Congress did not act on this proposal. Truman was more successful in pushing organic legislation for Guam, Samoa, and the Trust Territory of the Pacific Islands, the latter of which had been acquired from Japan after World War II. This legislation, passed in 1950 and 1951, transferred the territories from military to civilian administration, though the Navy continued to exercise considerable influence. In 1952, Congress passed a bill to recognize Puerto Rico's newly written constitution.

== Elections during the Truman presidency ==
Democratic seats in Congress
Congress	Senate	House
79th	57	243
80th	45	188
81st	54	263
82nd	48	234

=== 1946 mid-term elections ===
In the 1946 mid-term elections, Truman's Democrats suffered losses in both houses of Congress. Republicans, who had not controlled a chamber of Congress since the 1932 elections, took control of both the House and the Senate. Truman's party was hurt by a disappointing postwar economy, and the election was a major blow to Truman's hopes of passing his domestic policies. However, Dallek points to the 1946 elections as the moment when Truman became more sure of himself as president, and stopped trying to appease all factions of the public.

=== 1948 re-election campaign ===
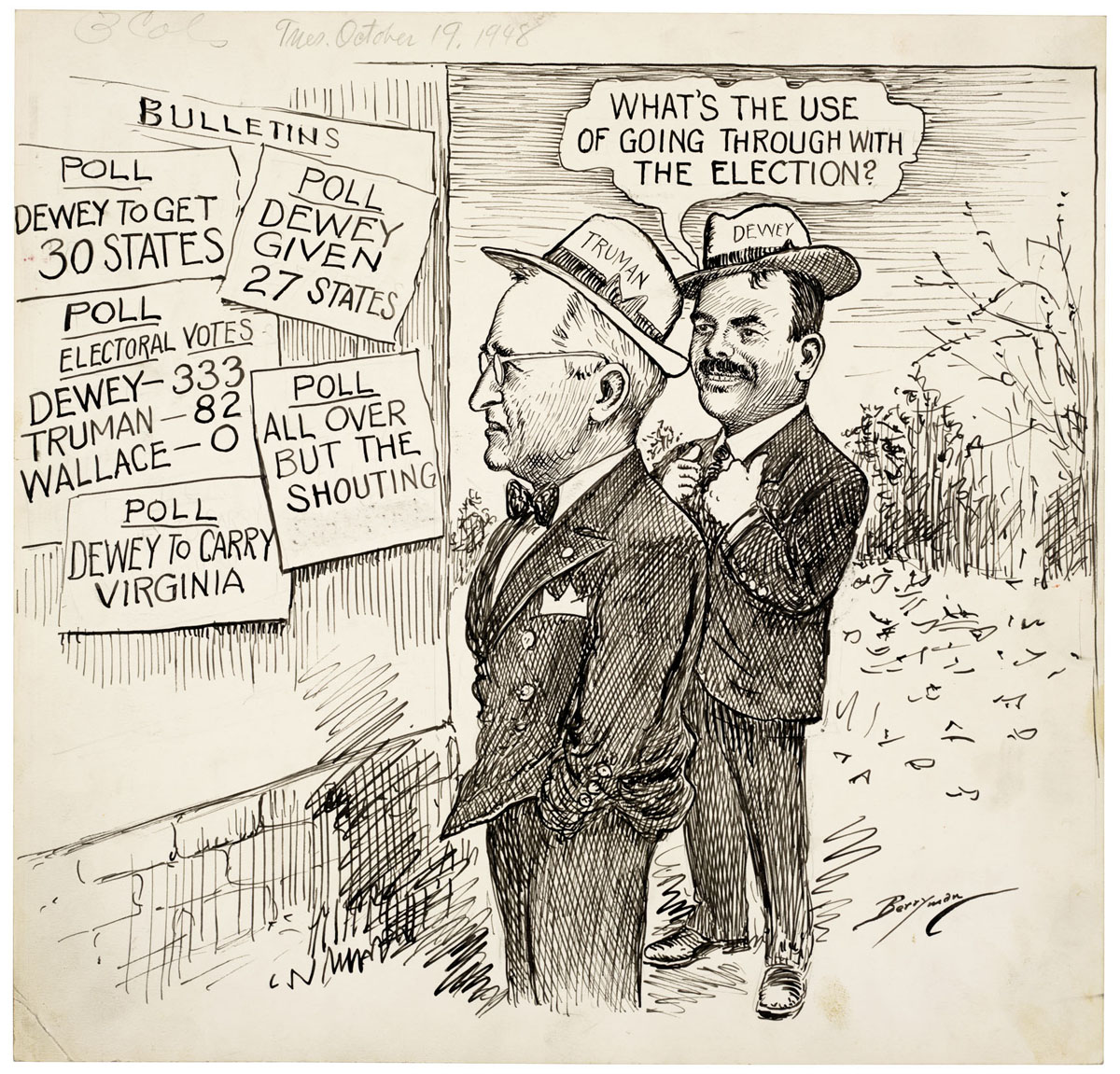
Clifford K. Berryman's editorial cartoon of October 19, 1948, shows the consensus of experts in mid-October

In the spring of 1948, Truman's public approval rating stood at 36%, and the president was nearly universally regarded as incapable of winning election in the 1948 presidential election. The "New Deal" loyalists within the party—including FDR's son James—tried to swing the Democratic nomination to General Dwight D. Eisenhower, a highly popular figure whose political views and party affiliation were totally unknown. Other liberals favored Associate Justice William O. Douglas, but both Eisenhower and Douglas refused to enter the race, and the "Stop Truman" movement failed to unite around any other candidate.

At the 1948 Democratic National Convention, Truman attempted to unify the Northern delegations with a vague civil rights plank in the party platform. He was upstaged by liberals like Minneapolis Mayor Hubert Humphrey, who convinced Truman and the convention to adopt a stronger civil rights plank. In response, many of the delegates from Alabama and Mississippi walked out of the convention. Unfazed, Truman delivered an aggressive acceptance speech attacking the 80th Congress, labeling it the "Do Nothing Congress." For his running mate, Truman accepted Kentucky Senator Alben W. Barkley after his preferred candidate, Justice William O. Douglas, turned down the nomination.

South Carolina Governor Strom Thurmond, a segregationist, declared his candidacy for the presidency on a Dixiecrat ticket and led a full-scale revolt of Southern "states' rights" proponents. This rebellion on the right was matched by one on the left, led by Wallace on the Progressive Party ticket. Wallace strongly criticized Truman's approach to the Soviet Union, and the Progressive Party's platform addressed a wide array of issues, including support for the desegregation of public schools, gender equality, a national health insurance program, free trade, and public ownership of large banks, railroads, and power utilities. Wallace won support from many liberals, intellectuals, union members, and military veterans. The Republicans, meanwhile, nominated New York Governor Thomas E. Dewey, who had been the party's 1944 presidential nominee.

Dewey waged a low-risk campaign and issued vague generalities on his plans once in office, while Thurmond found less support in the South than many had expected, as most white Southerners believed him to be too extreme. Wallace was unable to galvanize support behind his domestic policies, and his conciliatory attitude towards the Soviet Union alienated many potential supporters. Truman, meanwhile, crisscrossed the U.S. by train, delivering "whistle stop" speeches from the rear platform of the observation car. His combative appearances, such as those at the town square of Harrisburg, Illinois, captured the popular imagination and drew huge crowds. The large, mostly spontaneous gatherings at Truman's whistle stop events were an important sign of a change in momentum in the campaign, but this shift went virtually unnoticed by the national press corps. The three major polling organizations stopped polling well before the November 2 election date—Roper in September, and Crossley and Gallup in October—thus failing to measure the period when Truman may have surged past Dewey in public support.

President Truman defeated Republican Thomas E. Dewey in the 1948 presidential election.

In the end, Truman held his progressive Midwestern base, won most of the Southern states despite the civil rights plank, and squeaked through with narrow victories in a few critical states, notably Ohio, California, and Illinois. He won 49.6% of the popular vote and secured 303 electoral votes. Dewey received only 189 electoral votes; Thurmond garnered 39, and Henry Wallace none. Dewey carried several Northeastern states that had generally voted for Roosevelt, and the 1948 election was the closest presidential election since the 1916 election. In the concurrent congressional elections, the Democrats re-took control of the House and the Senate. The defining image of the campaign was a photograph snapped in the early morning hours of the day after the election, when an ecstatic Truman held aloft the erroneous front page of the Chicago Tribune with a huge headline proclaiming "Dewey Defeats Truman."

=== 1950 mid-term elections ===
In Truman's second mid-term election, Republicans ran against Truman's proposed domestic policies and his handling of the Korean War. They picked up seats in both the House and the senate, but failed to gain control of either house of Congress. Truman was particularly upset by the apparent success of those who campaigned on McCarthyism.

=== 1952 elections and transition period ===
==== Initial Truman campaign and withdrawal ====
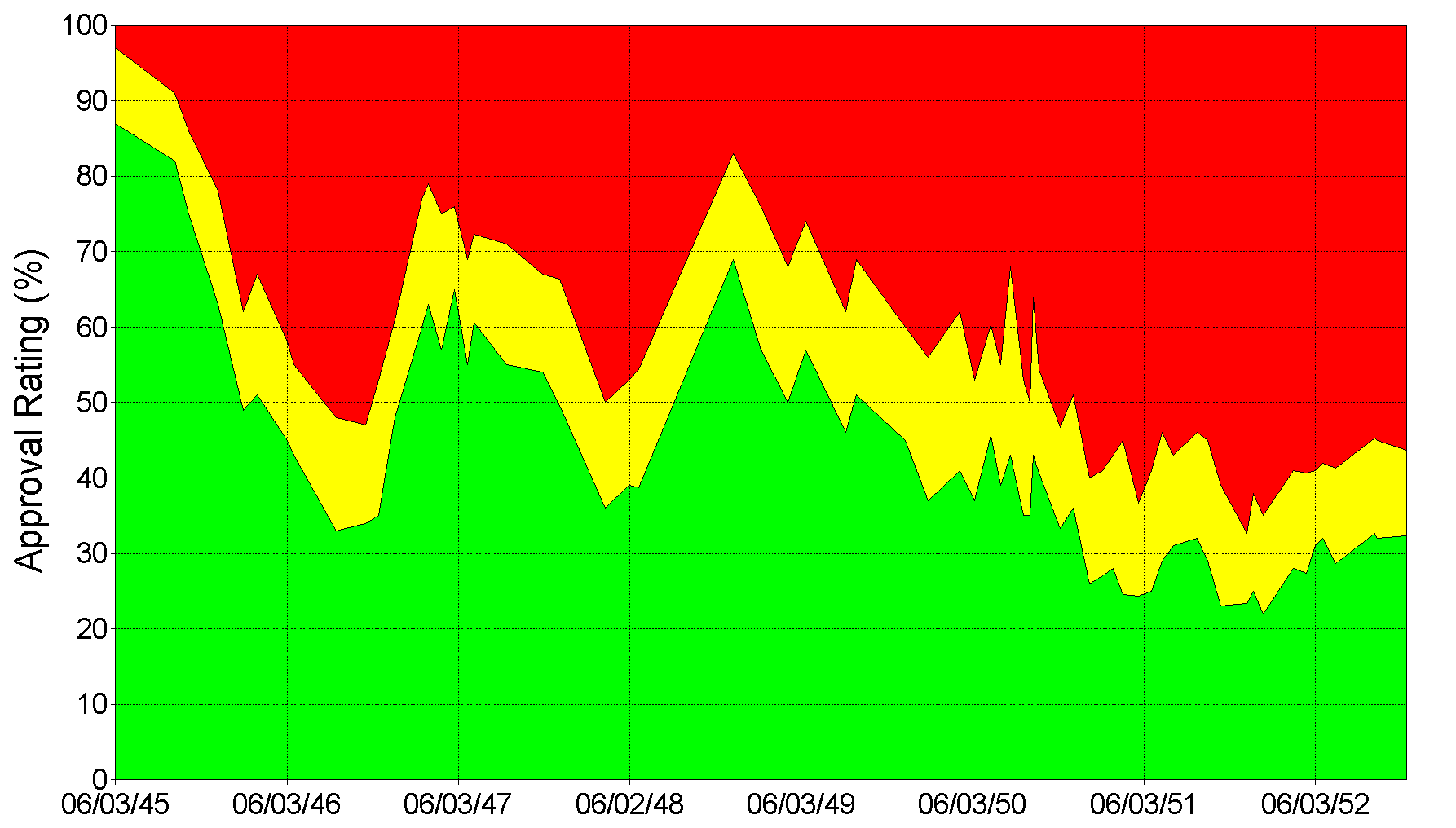
Graph of Truman's approval ratings in Gallup polls

By the time of the 1952 New Hampshire primary, one of the first major contests held in the 1952 Democratic primaries, Truman had not stated whether he would seek re-election, and no other candidate had won Truman's backing. Although the Twenty-second Amendment had been ratified, Truman could run for another term due to a grandfather clause in the amendment. Truman's first choice to succeed him, Chief Justice Vinson, had declined to run, Illinois Governor Adlai Stevenson had also turned Truman down, Vice President Barkley was considered too old, and Truman disliked Senator Kefauver. Accordingly, Truman let his name be entered in the New Hampshire primary by supporters. The highly unpopular Truman was handily defeated by Kefauver; 18 days later the president announced he would not seek a second full term. Truman was eventually able to persuade Stevenson to run, and the governor ultimately gained the nomination at the 1952 Democratic National Convention.

==== General election and transition period ====
Republican Dwight D. Eisenhower defeated Democrat Adlai Stevenson II in the 1952 presidential election

General Dwight D. Eisenhower's public stature, along with his unknown views on domestic issues, had made him appealing as a potential candidate for both parties in the 1948 election. Though he had generally supported Truman's foreign policy, Eisenhower privately held conservative views on most domestic issues and never seriously considered running for office as a Democrat. Beginning in 1951, eastern, internationalist Republicans, led by Thomas Dewey and Henry Cabot Lodge Jr., coordinated a draft movement designed to nominate Eisenhower as the Republican candidate for president. Eisenhower initially resisted these efforts, but in March 1952 he agreed to allow his name to be entered into the New Hampshire primary. He was motivated in part by his desire to defeat Robert A. Taft, the other major contender for the Republican nomination. The 1952 Republican primaries became a battle between Dewey's internationalist wing of the party and Taft's conservative, isolationist wing. Eisenhower narrowly prevailed over Taft at the 1952 Republican National Convention; with the approval of Eisenhower, the convention nominated Richard Nixon for vice president.

The once good Truman-Eisenhower relationship soured during the campaign. Truman was appalled when Eisenhower appeared on the same platform with Joseph McCarthy in Wisconsin, and failed to defend General George Marshall, who McCarthy had recently denounced as a failure in China. Eisenhower was outraged when Truman, who made a whistle-stop tour in support of Stevenson, accused Ike of disregarding "sinister forces ... Anti-Semitism, anti-Catholicism, and anti-foreignism" within the Republican Party.

Harry S. Truman's Farewell Address
Harry S. Truman's speech on leaving office, and returning home to Independence, Missouri. (January 15, 1953)

Though Stevenson's public service and issue-oriented campaign appealed to many liberals, he was unable to rally support among blacks, ethnic whites, and the working class. Eisenhower campaigned against what he denounced as Truman's failures: "Korea, Communism and Corruption." Polls consistently indicated that Eisenhower would win the race, and Nixon deftly handled a potentially dangerous controversy over his finances with his Checkers speech, delivered live on national television. In part due to the Checkers speech, television emerged as an important medium in the race; the number of households with televisions had grown from under 200,000 in 1948 to over 15 million in 1952. On election day, as widely expected, Eisenhower defeated Stevenson by a wide margin. Eisenhower took 55.4 percent of the popular vote and won 442 electoral votes, taking almost every state outside of the South. Though Eisenhower ran ahead of most congressional Republicans, his party nonetheless took control of both the House and Senate, giving the Republican Party unified control of Congress and the presidency for the first time since the 1930 elections.

== Historical reputation ==
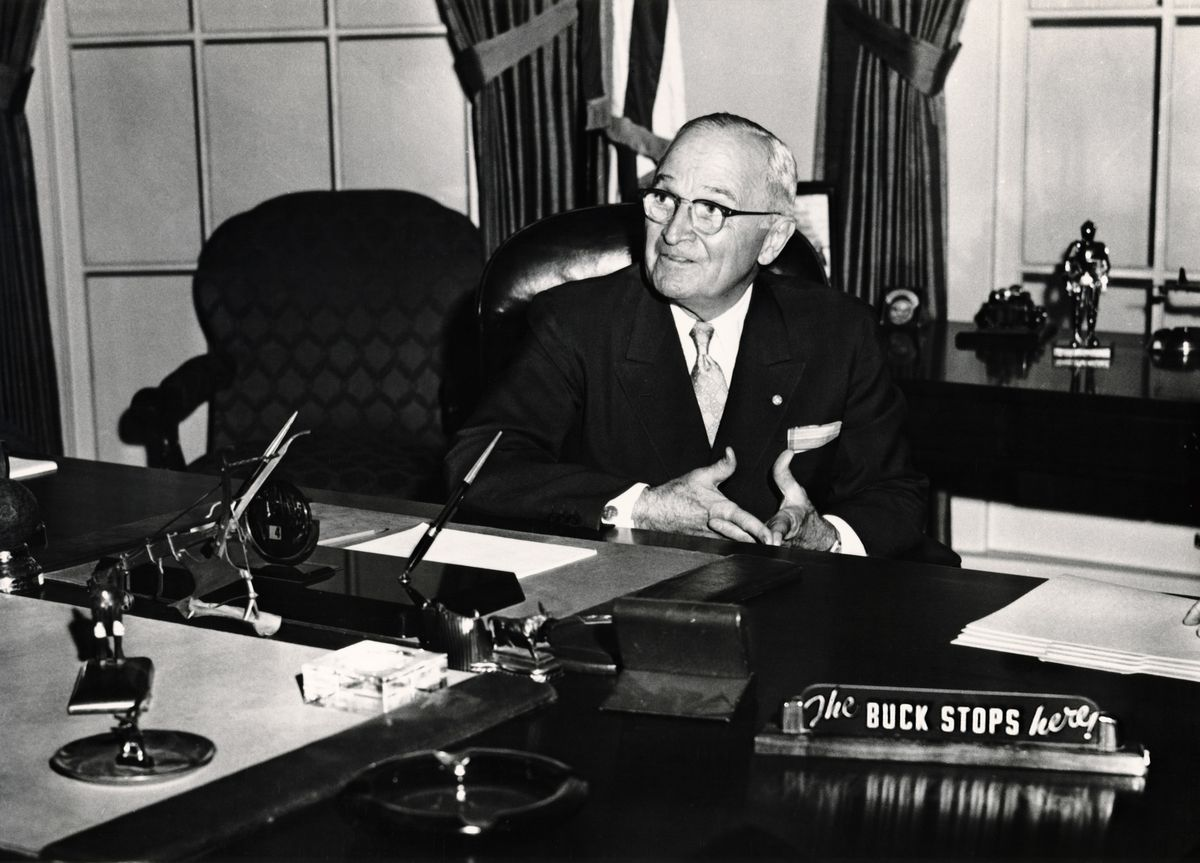
Truman poses in 1959 at the recreation of the Truman Oval Office at the Truman Library in 1959, with the famous "The Buck Stops Here" sign on his desk.

Truman's ranking in polls of historians and political scientists have never fallen lower than ninth, and he has ranked as high as fifth in a C-SPAN poll in 2009. A 2018 poll of the American Political Science Association’s presidents and Executive Politics section ranked Truman as the seventh best president, and a 2017 C-SPAN poll of historians ranked Truman as the sixth best president.

When he left office in 1953, the American public saw Truman as one of the most unpopular chief executives in history. His job approval rating of 22% in the Gallup Poll of February 1952 was lower than Richard Nixon's 24% in August 1974, the month that Nixon resigned in the wake of the Watergate scandal. In 1952, journalist Samuel Lubell stated that "after seven years of Truman's hectic, even furious, activity the nation seemed to be about on the same general spot as when he first came to office ... Nowhere in the whole Truman record can one point to a single, decisive break-through ... All his skills and energies—and he was among our hardest-working presidents—were directed to standing still". During the years of campus unrest in the 1960s and 1970s, revisionist historians on the left attacked his foreign policy as too hostile to Communism, and his domestic policy as too favorable toward business. However, Truman's image in university textbooks was quite favorable in the 1950s, and more established scholars never accepted the critiques of revisionist historians.

American public feeling towards Truman grew steadily warmer with the passing years. Truman died in 1972, and his death brought a new wave of attention to his political career. During this period, Truman captured the popular imagination, emerging as a kind of political folk hero, a president who was thought to exemplify an integrity and accountability many observers felt was lacking in the Nixon White House. This public reassessment of Truman was aided by the popularity of a book of reminiscences which Truman had told to journalist Merle Miller beginning in 1961, with the agreement that they would not be published until after Truman's death. Scholars who have compared the audio tapes with the published transcripts have concluded that Miller often distorted what Truman said or fabricated statements Truman never said.

The fall of the Soviet Union in 1991 caused Truman advocates to claim vindication for Truman's decisions in the postwar period. According to Truman biographer Robert Dallek, "His contribution to victory in the cold war without a devastating nuclear conflict elevated him to the stature of a great or near-great president." The 1992 publication of David McCullough's favorable biography of Truman further cemented the view of Truman as a highly regarded chief executive. Nevertheless, Truman continued to receive criticism. After a review of information available to Truman about the presence of espionage activities in the U.S. government, Democratic Senator Daniel Patrick Moynihan concluded that Truman was "almost willfully obtuse" concerning the danger of American communism. In 2002, historian Alonzo Hamby concluded that "Harry Truman remains a controversial president."

According to historian Daniel R. McCoy in his book on the Truman presidency,

Harry Truman himself gave a strong and far-from-incorrect impression of being a tough, concerned and direct leader. He was occasionally vulgar, often partisan, and usually nationalistic ... On his own terms, Truman can be seen as having prevented the coming of a third world war and having preserved from Communist oppression much of what he called the free world. Yet clearly he largely failed to achieve his Wilsonian aim of securing perpetual peace, making the world safe for democracy, and advancing opportunities for individual development internationally.

Biographer Robert Donovan has emphasized Truman's personality:

Vigorous, hard-working, simple, he had grown up close to the soil of the Midwest and understood the struggles of the people on the farms and in the small towns....After 10 years in the Senate, he had risen above the Pendergast organization. Still, he had come from a world of two-bit politicians, and its aura was one that he never was able to shed entirely. And he did retain certain characteristics one often sees in machine-bred politicians: intense partisanship, stubborn loyalty, a certain insensitivity about the transgressions of political associates, and a disinclination for the companionship of intellectuals and artists.
