= Brannan Plan =

1949 American failed farm bill

The Brannan Plan was a failed United States farm bill from 1949. It called for "compensatory payments" to American farmers in response to the major problem of large agricultural surpluses stemming from price supports for farmers. The Brannan Plan was named after Charles Brannan, who served as the fourteenth United States Secretary of Agriculture from 1948 to 1953 as a liberal member of President Harry S. Truman's cabinet. It was blocked by conservatives and never became law. The start of the Korean War in June 1950 made the surpluses a vital weapon and prices soared as surpluses were used up, making the proposal irrelevant.

== Background ==
During World War II, agricultural products were in very high demand by the fact that food was needed overseas. The government encouraged maximum production by setting prices for farm products well above the market-clearing level. This ultimately led to overproduction. While the demand for agriculture during the war was high, these wartime conditions proved to be unrealistic when the war ended. Following the war there were large farm surpluses. Subsequently, prices stemming from the price support became higher than consumers were willing to pay.

Prior to Brannan's proposal, the Agricultural Act of 1948, a revision of the Agricultural Adjustment Act of 1938, had recently been implemented. However, this act had merely extended the price support programs of the wartime law that would soon expire; something had to be improved. With the need for reform, Charles Brannan proposed for "Production and price adjustment with a definite income objective," which quickly became known as the "Brannan Plan." The goal was to provide high prices for corn, wheat, tobacco, cotton, milk, eggs chickens, hogs, beef and lambs. The political assumption was that American farmers were so morally critical to America that they should be given higher incomes, regardless of marketplace supply and demand. The plan was opposed by the business community and by the nearly unanimous farmers organizations, except for the left-wing National Farmers' Union, which was its chief sponsor.

== Proposal ==
In the free market, the prices that yielded were considered to be unfair to farmers. Under the New Deal support system, the government would raise the price to a "parity" price, and consumers would not be willing to buy as much. In turn, the government would purchase excess supply, which led to large amounts of storage. However, under the Brannan Plan, the government would allow the surplus to be sold for whatever price it would bring. Consequently, the price would drop to that determined by the market and result in an elimination of the surplus. To compensate for the low prices, the Treasury would write checks to farmers for the difference between the high parity price and the low new market price. Altogether, consumers would pay lower prices for farm products, resources would not be wasted producing food simply for storage, and farmers would benefit by receiving the parity price while producing the quantity demanded at the market price for the surplus.

== Opposition in Congress ==
Brannan's plan was opposed largely by conservative Republican representatives. Leading counterarguments included the beliefs that of parity or more was too great a price differentiation and granted on too many commodities, the burden on taxpayers would become too serious, and supporting farmers but not other groups would raise ethical concerns. Vermont Republican Senator George Aiken believed the matter of support levels was "a fundamental concern not only of economics, but of philosophy of government as well." The Brannan Plan would "require either huge payments from the Treasury or detailed and severe controls over agricultural production and marketing." It seems that despite Brannan's effort, most of Congress agreed that his plan valued farm prices at unrealistically-high levels.

In the 1948 presidential election, Truman received heavy support from Midwestern farmers and scored a surprise upset over the Republican opponent, Thomas Dewey. However, the Conservative Coalition still controlled Congress and remained opposed to the plan. The Korean War began in June 1950 and so food became a weapon against communism in the Cold War. Prices rose, and the surpluses were used up.

== See also ==
- United States farm bill for major legislation
