= Charles F. Brannan =

American politician (1903–1992)

Charles Brannan
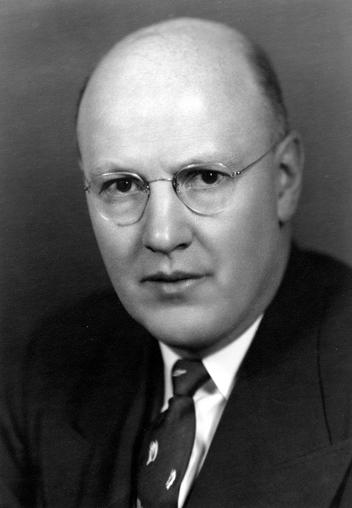
- Brannan in 1948

14th United States Secretary of Agriculture
- In office June 2, 1948 – January 20, 1953
- President: Harry S. Truman
- Preceded by: Clinton P. Anderson
- Succeeded by: Ezra Taft Benson

Personal details
- Born: Charles Franklin Brannan; August 23, 1903 Denver, Colorado, U.S.
- Died: July 2, 1992 (aged 88) Denver, Colorado, U.S.
- Party: Democratic
- Spouse: Eda Seltzer
- Education: Regis University (BA); University of Denver (LLB)

Charles Franklin Brannan (August 23, 1903 – July 2, 1992) was the United States secretary of agriculture from 1948 to 1953. He was a liberal Democrat best known for proposing the "Brannan Plan", which was rejected by a conservative Congress and never took effect. Brannan was the last surviving member of Harry S. Truman's cabinet.

== Early life ==
Brannan was born in Denver, Colorado on August 23, 1903. He came from a Quaker family; his father was an engineer. He received his law degree from the University of Denver law school in 1929. In 1932, Brannan married Eda V. Seltzer. He practiced law in Denver, specializing in agricultural, mining, and irrigation issues. He was an ardent Democrat and a supporter of the New Deal.

== Government lawyer ==
He began as a lawyer in the Resettlement Administration, where he relocated destitute tenant farmers hurt by the "dust bowl." In 1937, he became a regional attorney for the Department of Agriculture. In 1941, he moved to the Farm Security Administration, where he arranged loans for water facilities and needy farmers in the Mountain states. In 1944, he became assistant secretary of agriculture under Secretary Clinton Anderson, who put him in charge of long-range planning. When Anderson resigned in 1948, he recommended Brannan, as did the president of the liberal Farmers Union.

== Secretary of Agriculture, 1948-1953 ==
In 1949, he advocated the Brannan Plan, as part of President Harry S. Truman's Fair Deal program. Brannan wanted to guarantee farmers income, while letting free market forces determine the prices of commodities. That plan was not enacted by the Republican controlled congress, which was focusing on the Cold War.

Following the election of Dwight D. Eisenhower in 1953, Brannan left the government and became the general counsel for the National Farmers Union.

== Senate campaign ==
In 1956 he was defeated in the Democratic primary by John A. Carroll for the Colorado U.S. Senate race.

== Death ==
Brannan died on July 2, 1992, at age 88, in Denver. He was the last surviving member of the Truman Cabinet.

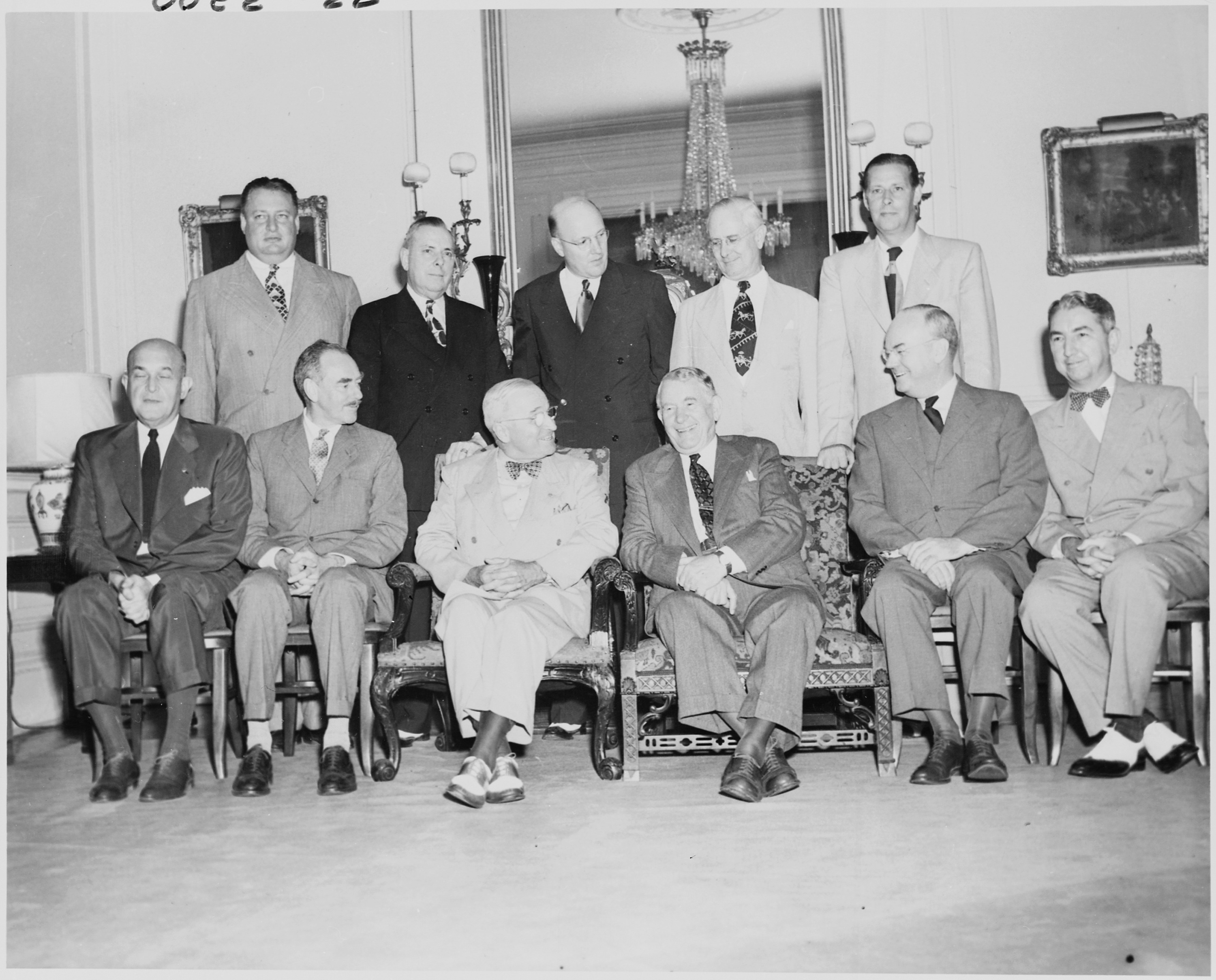
The members of Truman's cabinet in August, 1949, from left to right: Alben W. Barkley, Dean G. Acheson, Truman, John W. Snyder, Louis A. Johnson, Tom C. Clark, Jesse M. Donaldson, Julius A. Krug, Brannan, Charles W. Sawyer and Maurice J. Tobin

== In popular culture ==
In Mary Robinette Kowal's alternate-history novel The Calculating Stars (2018), Brannan remains secretary of agriculture even after Thomas E. Dewey wins the 1948 presidential election. He happens to be touring farms in Kansas on March 3, 1952, when a meteorite strike obliterates Washington, D.C.; as the only surviving member of the presidential line of succession, he becomes acting president. Brannan goes on to win both the 1952 and 1956 presidential elections, defeating Dwight D. Eisenhower in the latter.

Political offices
| Preceded by Clinton P. Anderson | U.S. Secretary of Agriculture; Served under: Harry S. Truman; 1948–1953 | Succeeded by Ezra Taft Benson |
