= Vernon v Bethell =

1762 English property law case

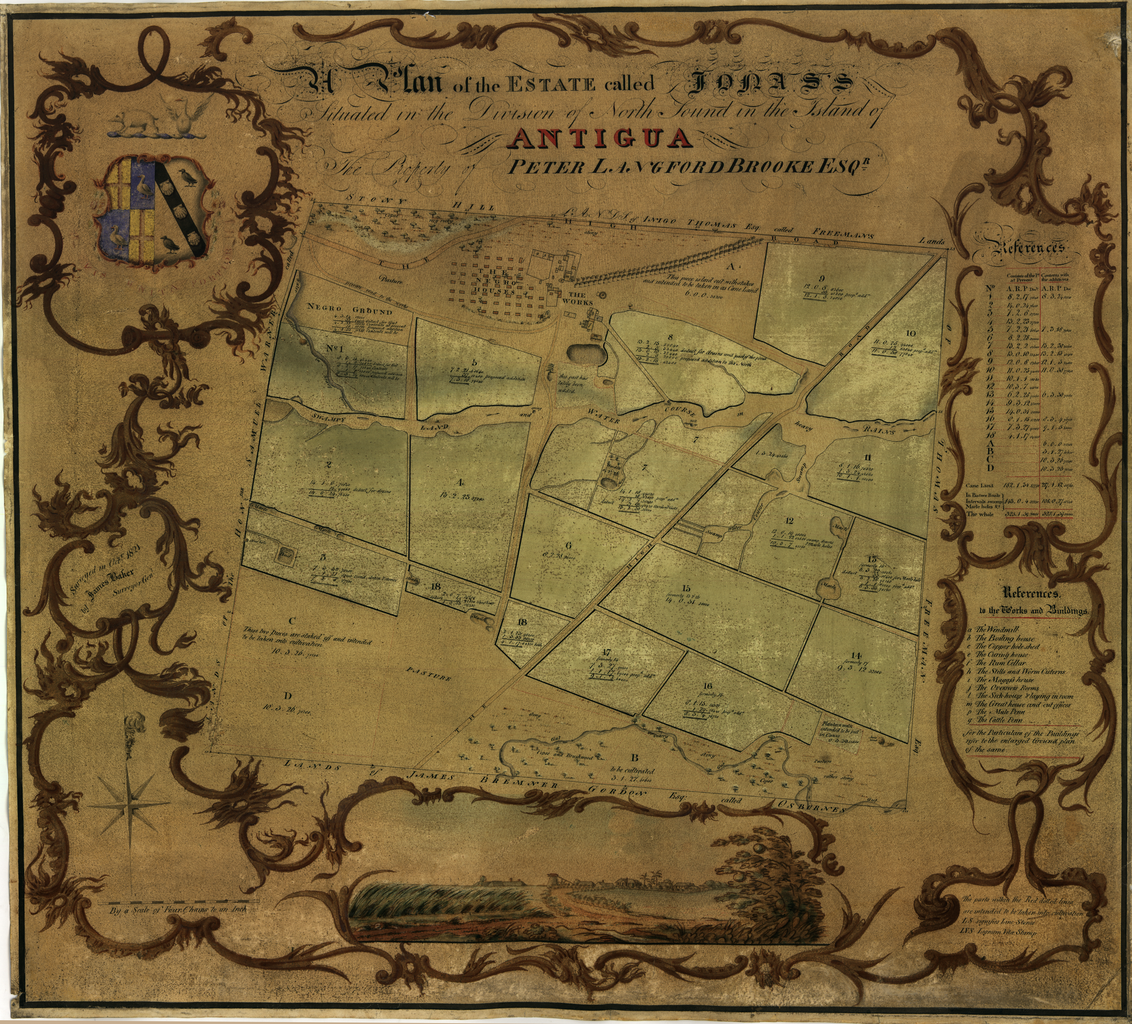
- Court: Court of Chancery
- Citation: (1762) 28 ER 838, 2 Eden 110

Keywords
- Equity of redemption, necessity

Vernon v Bethell (1762) 28 ER 838 is an English property law case, where it was affirmed that there could be no clog on the equity of redemption. In justifying this rule, Lord Henley LC made the famous observation that,

necessitous men are not, truly speaking, free men, but, to answer a present exigency, will submit to any terms that the crafty may impose upon them.

The case stands for the principle "once a mortgage, always a mortgage", meaning a borrower cannot contract to give up his automatic right to redeem title to his property once the debt is paid. It was a landmark decision in upholding some basic protection at common law for debtors. It also had historic significance in that the principle it laid out inspired the Second Bill of Rights, proclaimed by the American President Franklin D. Roosevelt in his 1944 State of the Union Address, to promote basic social and economic rights for all citizens.

== Facts ==
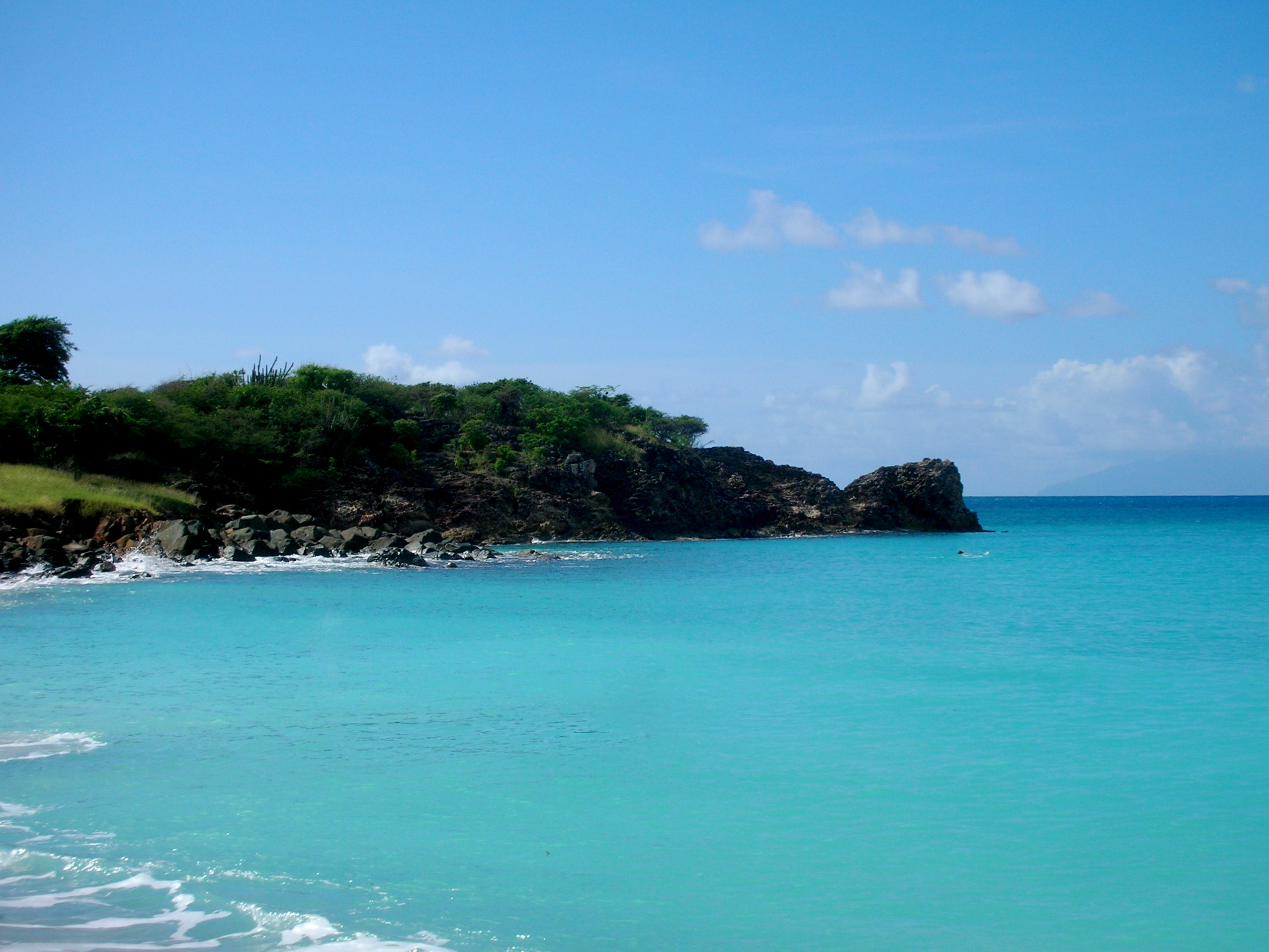
Antigua today.

Major James Vernon wished to pay off his debts to Mr Bethell’s estate and recover title of a sugar plantation in Antigua where he lived. Vernon had taken out a £278 mortgage on the land, and on 5 March 1729 he assigned the mortgage to Mr Bethell, to whom he sold sugar, and got from him further loans of £5000 to £6000. On 23 April 1738 Bethell requested repayment of sums owed, by then £9541 9s 1d, or the enforcement of the security by taking possession of the land, but still leave some for Major Vernon and his family. On 25 August 1738 Vernon replied that he would convey possession of the land to Bethell for five guineas, and its profits, for release of the debt of £9976 1s 11d. Various other letters and statements by Bethell acknowledged that Vernon should be able to recover title if his debts were paid off. When Bethell died, his will from 19 March 1758 stated that if Vernon ceased with some ‘unjust pretences’ to defeat his title to the land and would accept £6000, then he should be given full title. The price of the land by then had risen significantly, and Vernon sought a declaration that he retained the equity of redemption, that he could get full title to his land back with debts repaid.

== Judgment ==
Lord Henley LC held that there could be no clog on the equity of redemption, so that any restriction on the right to redeem one's property had the debt been discharged was ineffective. He held the exchange of letters between Mr Bethell and Major Vernon showed that only a security interest, and not an absolute conveyance was intended.

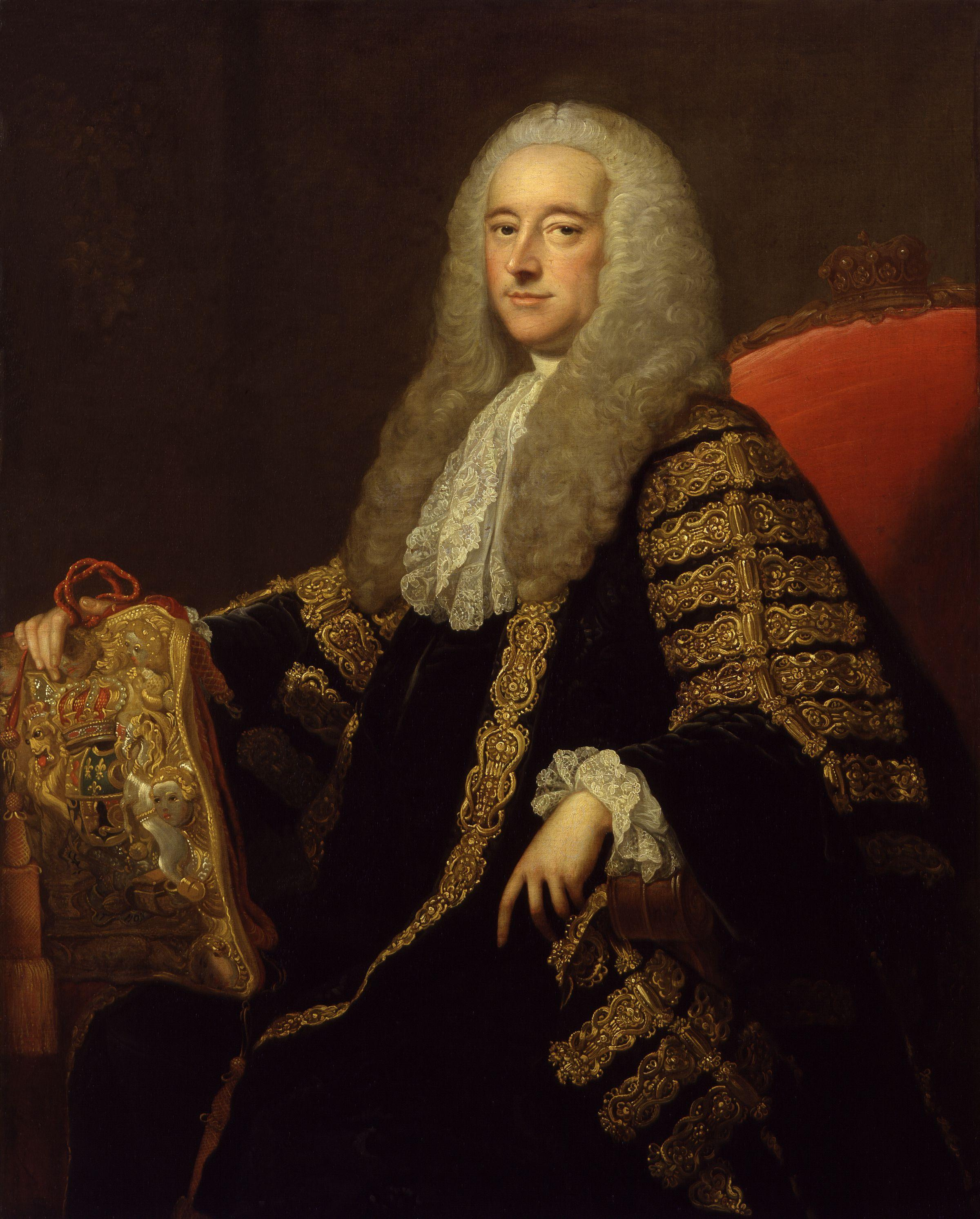
The Lord Chancellor, later ennobled as the Earl of Northington.

The principal question in this cause is, whether, upon the whole of this transaction, the plaintiff ought to be decreed a redemption of this Antigua estate, or that I should consider Mr. Bethell as the absolute purchaser thereof bona fide, and for his absolute benefit under deed of the 25th of August 1738.

This court, as a court of conscience, is very jealous of persons taking securities for a loan, and converting such securities into purchases. And therefore I take it to be an established rule, that a mortgagee can never provide at the time of making the loan for any event or condition on which the equity of redemption shall be discharged, and the conveyance absolute. And there is great reason and justice in this rule, for necessitous men are not, truly speaking, free men, but, to answer a present exigency, will submit to any terms that the crafty may impose upon them.

The present case, as it stands on the deed, is not that; but when it is considered with the other proofs, and particularly with the letters and books of Mr. Bethell, it seems to be very much within the mischief which the rule intended to prevent, of making an undue use of the influence of a mortgagee.

The case is this: Mr. Bethell was a West India merchant, and consignee of the produce of Mr. John Vernon's estate, and advancing him from time to time several sums of money, secured by a mortgage of anticipation at an interest of five per cent., with springing redemptions on the several loans. By the year 1738 there appears to be due to the mortgagee near £10,000, upon which Mr. Bethell applies to Mr. Vernon by letter, No. 1, and that is the only intercourse, by writing or otherwise, proved to me, concerning the deed of the 25th of August 1738. For the orders and instructions for the deed were given by Mr. Bethell to Mr. North, who only believes he sent the draft of the release to Mr. Vernon. This letter mentions the largeness of his demands, that it was no longer to be trifled with, and that therefore he must insist on having the possession, not for his own security only, but for preserving something out of the estate which might remain to Mr. Vernon and his family.

I cannot, therefore, believe, that at the time of writing this letter, Mr. Bethell intended to take in propriety and as an absolute purchase for his own benefit. Besides the consideration of the conveyance is only five guineas (which Mr. Bethell intended five shillings), and the alteration of it was Mr. North's. And though Mr. Vernon granted and released the estate, yet Mr. Bethell never released the covenant for the payment of the mortgage-money, or made it part of the consideration. The same account is kept afterwards with this difference only, the one is kept as consignee, the other as consignee and mortgagee in possession.

It was asked, if this deed was not to be an absolute purchase, what was to be the use of it? Answer, a very material one, and which answered the exigency of the letter; the easy and certain method of getting possession. Every body knows the difficulty of getting possession under a mortgage in the West Indies. But there is no difficulty in getting possession on a purchase. It was said, there was no promise of a defeasance. That is not necessary. But here is proved, in writing, a promise that the estate should be only a pledge, and that the deed should be defeasible. (Vide Spurgeon v Collier, 1 Eden, 60.)

As to the £6000, it is given on terms conditional, and must be taken by a compliance with them. Mr. Bethell negatived the plaintiff's right, and offered this as a bonus for him to negative the same. He has pursued that right, and insisted on it; therefore, if he had failed, I should have been of opinion, he could not have resorted to the £6000. (Reg. Lib. B. 1761, fol. 127.) (As to legacies upon condition not to dispute a will, vide Lloyd v Spillet, 3 P. W. 344. Powell v Morgan, 2 Vern. 90, and the cases in the notes.)

== Significance ==
The famous phrase that "necessitous men are not truly speaking free men" was repeated in Franklin D Roosevelt's 1944 State of the Union Address to justify a Second Bill of Rights in the United States, in favour of basic social and economic guarantees.

== See also ==
- English land law
- English contract law
- English property law
- Howard v Harris (1681) 1 Vern 33, no ‘clog on the equity of redemption’
- Toomes v Conset (1745) 3 Atk 261; 26 ER 952, Lord Hardwicke LC, “This court will not suffer, in a deed of mortgage, any agreement in it to prevail, that the estate become an absolute purchase in the mortgagee upon any event whatsoever.”
- Russell v. Southard 53 US 139 (1851)
- Samuel v Jarrah Timber and Wood Paving Corp Ltd [1904] UKHL 2
- G&C Kreglinger v New Patagonia Meat & Cold Storage Co Ltd [1913] UKHL 1, Lord Parker, 61, “there is now no rule in equity which precludes a mortgagee, whether the mortgage be made upon the occasion of a loan or otherwise, from stipulating for any collateral advantage, provided such collateral advantage is not either (1) unfair and unconscionable or, (2) in the nature of a penalty clogging the equity of redemption or, (3) inconsistent with or repugnant to the contractual and equitable right to redeem.”
- Warnborough Ltd v Garmite Ltd [2003] EWCA Civ 1544
- Cukurova Finance International Ltd v Alfa Telecom Turkey Ltd [2013] UKPC 2 and [2013] UKPC 20
