= 1943 State of the Union Address =

Speech by US President Franklin D. Roosevelt

- Date: January 7, 1943
- Venue: House Chamber, United States Capitol
- Location: Washington, D.C.
- Type: State of the Union Address
- Participants: Franklin D. Roosevelt; Henry A. Wallace; Sam Rayburn
- Previous: 1942 State of the Union Address
- Next: 1944 State of the Union Address

The 1943 State of the Union Address was delivered by President Franklin D. Roosevelt on January 7, 1943, during a critical phase of World War II. Roosevelt reflected on the previous year's key military developments, celebrated the bravery of American and Allied forces, and outlined the challenges and strategies for the ongoing global conflict. He also discussed the broader goals of the war, including securing freedom and peace for all nations.

Roosevelt began by honoring the valor of American forces who had fought in the war's first major battles, such as Wake Island, Bataan, and Midway. He praised their "unconquerable spirit" and noted the growing strength of the Allied forces against the Axis powers. He highlighted the importance of the Battle of Stalingrad and the Soviet counteroffensives, which he described as the most significant military developments of 1942.

Roosevelt emphasized that the Axis powers had failed to win the war in 1942, marking a turning point in favor of the Allied forces. He reviewed strategic successes, such as the Allied landings in North Africa and the defense of the Pacific. He also acknowledged the sacrifices made by American forces during defensive campaigns in the Solomon Islands and New Guinea.

On the economic front, Roosevelt praised America's rapidly expanding war production, noting that in 1942, the United States had produced 48,000 military planes, surpassing the combined production of Germany, Italy, and Japan. He outlined ambitious production goals for 1943, including increases in aircraft, tanks, and other war materiel.

Roosevelt also discussed the Four Freedoms, reiterating that the United States was fighting for freedom of speech, freedom of worship, freedom from want, and freedom from fear. He stressed that the nation must not only win the war but also secure a lasting peace that ensured these freedoms for all people.

The president concluded by calling for unity on the home front, acknowledging the inconveniences and sacrifices Americans would face as the war effort intensified. He expressed confidence in victory and a commitment to building a better post-war world.

Preceded by 1942 State of the Union Address	State of the Union addresses 1943	Succeeded by 1944 Second Bill of Rights
