= 1941 State of the Union Address =

Speech by US President Franklin D. Roosevelt

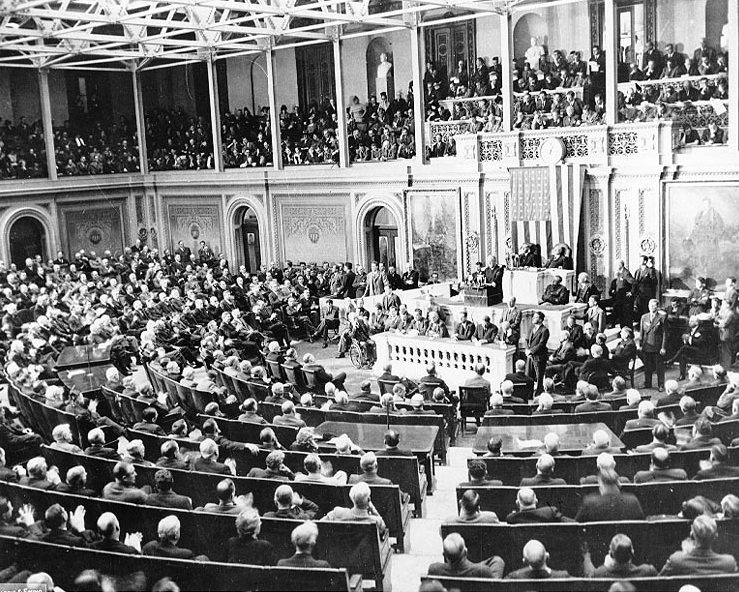
- Roosevelt addressing Congress in 1941, either in his 'Four Freedoms' or 'Day of Infamy' speech
- Date: January 6, 1941
- Venue: House Chamber, United States Capitol
- Location: Washington, D.C.
- Type: State of the Union Address
- Participants: Franklin D. Roosevelt; John Nance Garner; Sam Rayburn
- Previous: 1940 State of the Union Address
- Next: 1942 State of the Union Address
- Audio of FDR's speech FDR's speech at the 1941 State of the Union Speech, 6 January 1941

The 1941 State of the Union address, also known as the Four Freedoms Speech, was delivered by Franklin D. Roosevelt, the 32nd president of the United States, on January 6, 1941, to the 77th Congress. In it, Roosevelt warned of unprecedented global threats from the Axis powers of World War II and introduced his vision of the Four Freedoms: Freedom of speech and expression, Freedom of worship, Freedom from want, and Freedom from fear.

Roosevelt called for expanded defense production and Lend-Lease aid to nations resisting aggression, asserting the U.S. role as the "arsenal of democracy." Domestically, he advocated for increased taxation to fund defense, unemployment insurance, and economic reforms.

The address became a defining moment in U.S. foreign policy, reinforcing the nation's commitment to democracy and influencing post-war frameworks like the Atlantic Charter.

== Address ==
=== Creation ===
To assist him in writing the speech, Roosevelt placed his close advisors Harry Hopkins, Samuel Rosenman, and Robert E. Sherwood in charge of preparing initial drafts with input from Adolf A. Berle and Benjamin V. Cohen. With edits and revisions by Roosevelt, the speech went through seven drafts. It was not until the fourth draft that the Four Freedoms was added. When meeting with Hopkins, Rosenman and Sherwood at the White House, Roosevelt introduced the idea of the Four Freedoms for the peroration.

=== Speech ===
Roosevelt's speech lasted for about 35-minutes. The main topic discussed by Roosevelt throughout the speech was the threat posed by the Axis powers of Germany, Italy and Japan to the democracies of the world and the United States. He stated that despite prior conflicts and periods of crisis before WW1, at no point was the U.S.' national security or independence seriously threatened.

Roosevelt then stated that he was unhappy to report that America's future, safety and democracy hinged on events taking place across the world, and that the armed defence of democracy was being waved in the continents of Europe, Asia, Africa and Australasia. He warned that if that the populations and resources of these democracies fell, an unprepared America would be unable to properly defend itself and that any peace from dictators would only be temporary. However, he stated that it was unlikely for a direct attack to occur and that real danger came from secret agents. Stating that America was in serious danger and, although progress had been made in some areas, Roosevelt said that he was "not satisfied with the progress" with America's current armament production.

Roosevelt asked Congress to help him shift America towards wartime production to become an arsenal to supply the Allied powers, where he recommended that such nations not be obliged to pay until the end of the war. And even if such aid caused threats of war, he said that future generations depended on how effective American aid was. He also said that tax should constitute a larger percentage of the defence budget to prevent war profiteers. Towards the end of his speech, he described the foundations and expectations of a strong and healthy democracy and that they " look forward to a world founded upon four essential human freedoms": freedom of speech and expression, freedom of worship. Throughout the speech, Roosevelt never mentioned the name of any of the Axis leaders, instead referring to them collectively as dictators whose New Order was an antithesis to Roosevelt's Four Freedoms.

== Reponses ==
Although the speech was popular and its goals influential in post-war politics, the speech received heavy criticism from America's anti-war elements. Critics argued that the Four Freedoms constituted a charter for New Deal, whose social reforms had already created divisions within Congress. Roosevelt's conservative opponents argued against his attempt to justify the war as necessary for the defence of his social programs and government intervention.

== Legacy ==
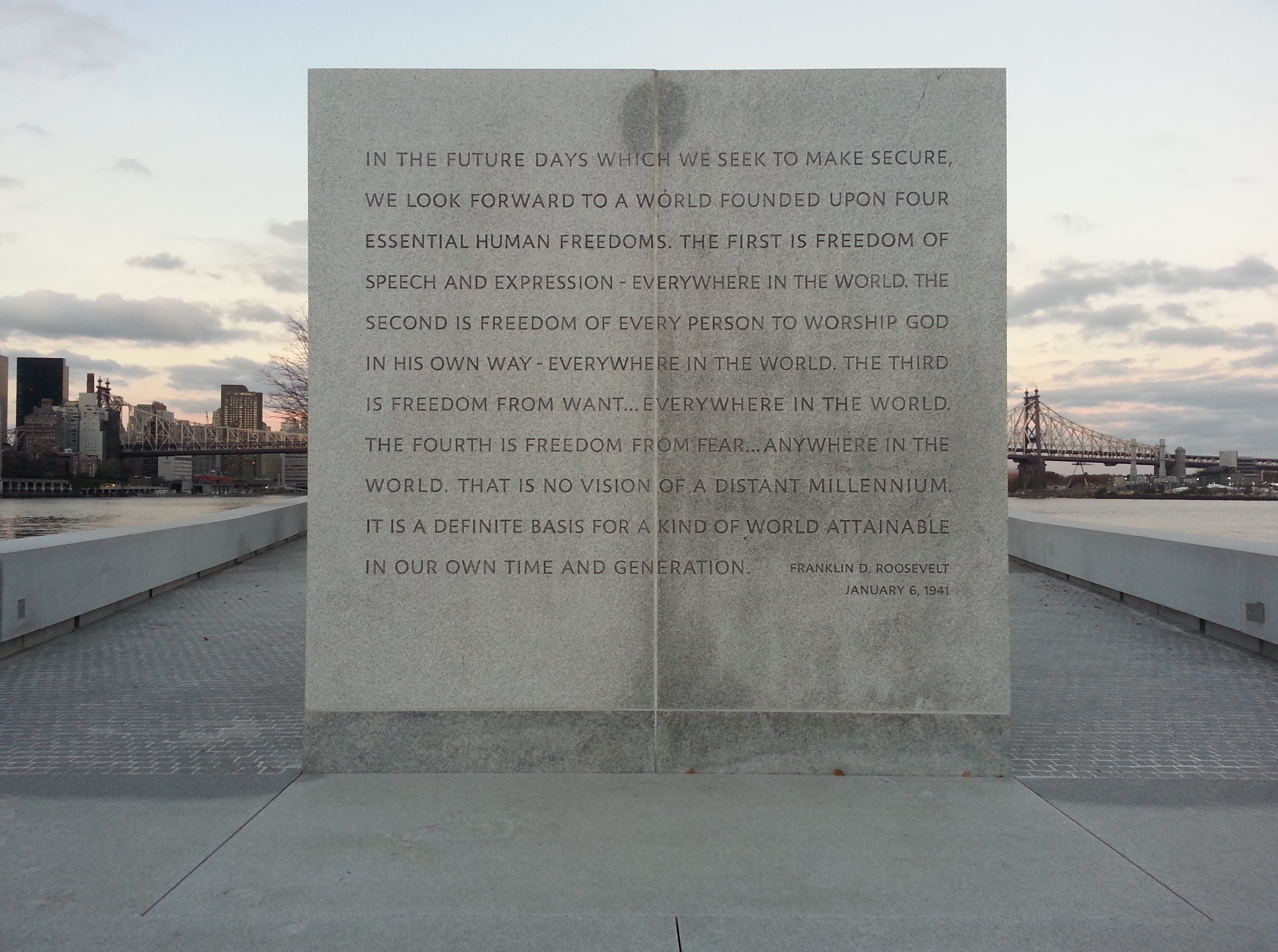
Plaque with Roosevelt's 'Four Freedoms' quote from the address

Roosevelt's 1941 State of the Union address left a significant legacy stemming mainly from the Four Freedoms he spoke of. During the Second World War, artist Norman Rockwell created a series of paintings visualising the Four Freedoms. They were incorporated into the preamble to the Universal Declaration of Human Rights after the war.

Designed by architect Louis Kahn, the Franklin D. Roosevelt Four Freedoms Park of Roosevelt Island in New York City is a celebration of the address with quotes from the speech inscribed on a granite wall.

| Preceded by 1940 State of the Union Address | State of the Union addresses 1941 | Succeeded by 1942 State of the Union Address |
