= Bill of Rights socialism =

American socialist ideology regarding the Bill of Rights

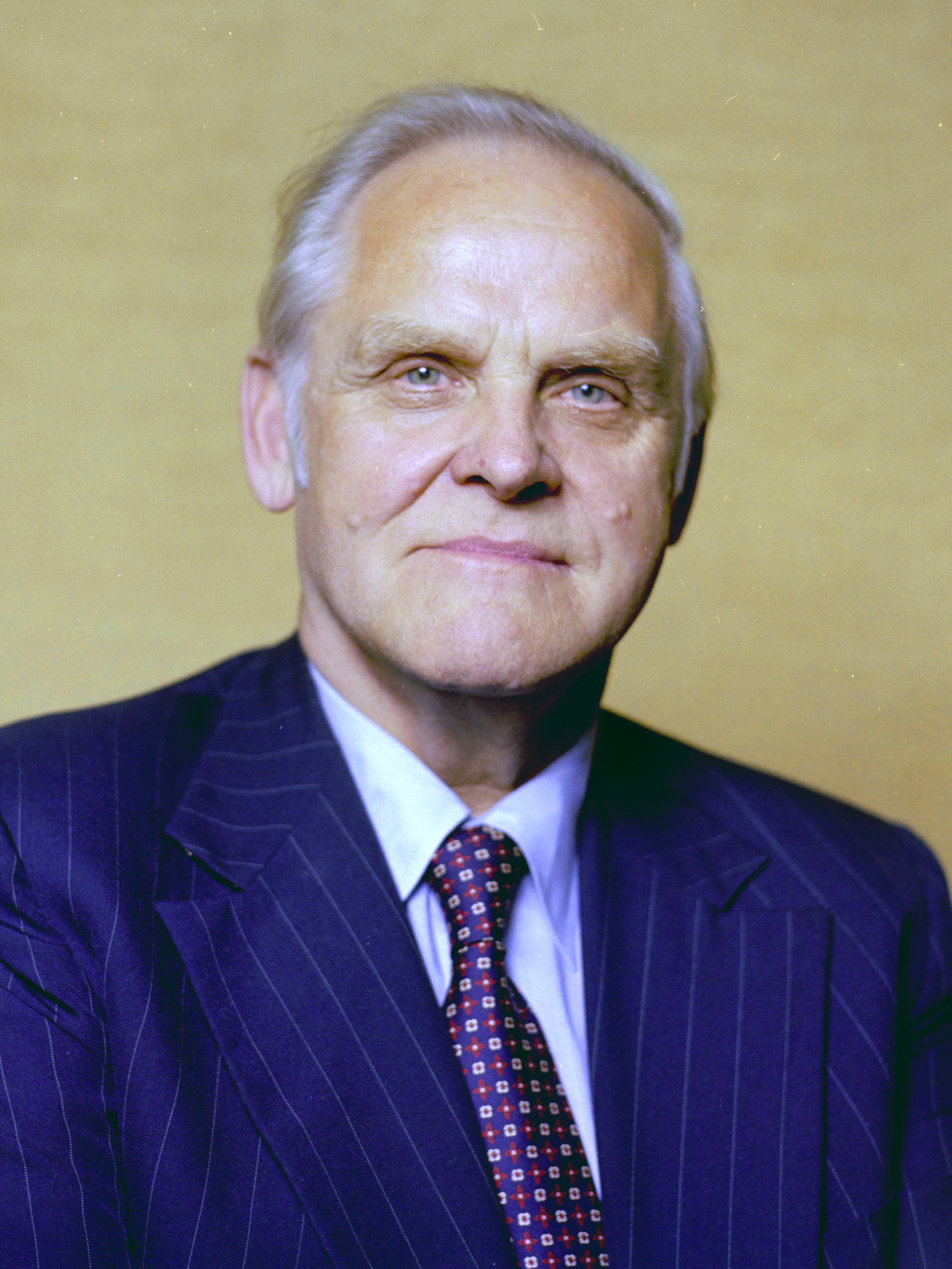
Gus Hall, who coined the term (1980)

Bill of Rights socialism is an ideology based on the interpretation that the United States Bill of Rights advocated for a socialist society or that if need be, a new United States Bill of Rights that explicitly advocated for it should be made. The concept was coined by Gus Hall, General Secretary of Communist Party USA. Communist Party USA has advocated for amending the United States Constitution to include the right to join a union, the right to a fair-paying job and others.

Bill of Rights socialism was advocated by an article from the Democratic Socialists of America in 2012.

== Concept ==
In 2012, an article by the Democratic Socialists of America advocated for the idea. It proposed the following public policies in order to according to them "achieve basic human social and economic rights" whose implementation would "help to achieve freedom and dignity for all Americans":

- Single-payer healthcare
- Affordable and safe housing
- Universal childcare
- Progressive taxation
- Tuition-free higher education
- Income security
- Leisure time
- Healthy environment
- Free association
- Cutting military expenditures
- A return to a Keynesian model
- Maximum wage ceilings

== Criticism ==
The idea of Bill of Rights socialism has drawn criticism, including from the political right. Writing for the Future of Freedom Foundation, Richard Embley described Franklin D. Roosevelt's Second Bill of Rights and the idea of a socialist United States Bill of Rights as a command economy and "regulatory socialism". Other critics argue that socialism in the form of central planning is inherently incompatible with the constitutionally enforced federalism in the United States that includes a separation of powers and a degree of decentralization. Additionally, some American socialists believe that federalism protects established political interests and wish for a constitutional amendment to change it.

== See also ==
- Second Bill of Rights
