= 1946 State of the Union Address =

Speech by US President Harry S. Truman

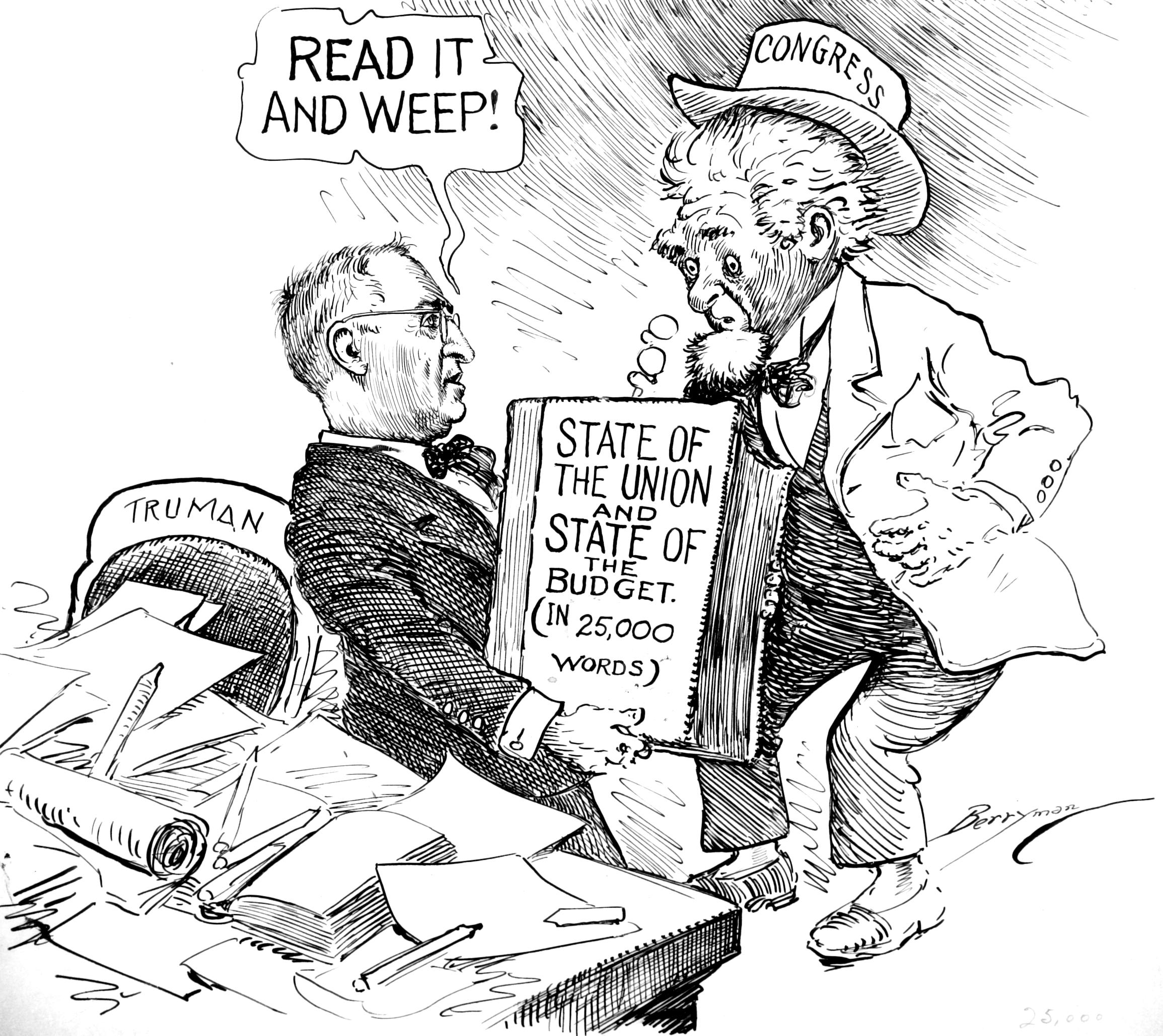
- Cartoon by Clifford K. Berryman depicting Congress' reaction to receiving the State of the Union.
- Date: January 21, 1946
- Venue: House Chamber and Senate Chamber, United States Capitol
- Location: Washington, D.C.
- Type: State of the Union Address
- Participants: Harry S. Truman; Kenneth McKellar; Sam Rayburn
- Format: Written
- Previous: 1945 State of the Union Address
- Next: 1947 State of the Union Address

The 1946 State of the Union Address was given by the 33rd president of the United States, Harry S. Truman, on Monday, January 21, 1946, to the 79th United States Congress. It was written by Samuel Rosenman and is notable for being the longest State of the Union message at the time: the written speech was sent to Congress, not orally given, and was 27,465 words long. The address combined Truman's economic report with state of the union information regarding returning to a peace economy after the end of World War II, foreign policy in Europe and the admission of Hawaii into the United States.

In the address, Truman stated, "At Moscow the United States, the Union of Soviet Socialist Republics, and Great Britain agreed to further this development by supporting the efforts of the national government and nongovernmental Chinese political elements in bringing about cessation of civil strife and in broadening the basis of representation in the Government. That is the policy which General Marshall is so ably executing today. It is the purpose of the Government of the United States to proceed as rapidly as is practicable toward the restoration of the sovereignty of Korea and the establishment of a democratic government by the free choice of the people of Korea."

Truman also urged Congress to admit Hawaii into the United States, but cautioned them to wait on admitting Alaska until "it is certain that this is the desire of the people of that great territory".

== See also ==
- 1946 United States House of Representatives elections

| Preceded by 1945 State of the Union Address | State of the Union addresses 1946 | Succeeded by 1947 State of the Union Address |
