= Wagner-Murray-Dingell Bill =

Failed 1940s U.S. healthcare reform legislation

The Wagner-Murray-Dingell Bill, abbreviated WMD, was a failed proposal in the United States Congress to institute a system of national health insurance in the United States. Part of President Harry S. Truman's Fair Deal program, the bill was supported by labor unions and opposed by the American Medical Association, who denounced the proposal as "socialized medicine". Reintroduced annually between 1943 and 1949, the bill was an attempt at healthcare reform in the United States.

== History ==
Senator Robert F. Wagner of New York, Senator James E. Murray of Montana, and Representative John D. Dingell Sr. of Michigan introduced the bill to Congress on November 19, 1945.

A similar bill of the same name was introduced in 1943 but not enacted. The 1943 attempt was distinct.

Reintroduced annually between 1943 and 1949, the bill never advanced beyond the committee hearing stage.

== Society and culture ==
Henry Kraus' book, In the City was a Garden, is about experiences of the resident's council of a World War II Garden Apartment (FHA) housing project for the war effort in San Pedro Ca. Chapter VI - Kaleidoscope of Change, gives an extended account of attempts to provide medical clinics in the projects and the California Medical Association response against what it called "government medicine."

== See also ==
- Medicare (United States)
