= 1944 State of the Union Address =

Speech by US President Franklin D. Roosevelt

- Date: January 11, 1944
- Location: Washington, D.C.
- Type: State of the Union Address
- Participants: Franklin D. Roosevelt; Henry A. Wallace; Sam Rayburn
- Format: Written
- Previous: 1943 State of the Union Address
- Next: 1945 State of the Union Address

The 1944 State of the Union address was delivered by Franklin D. Roosevelt, the 32nd president of the United States, on January 11, 1944, amidst the ongoing Second World War.

As was tradition since Woodrow Wilson, Roosevelt intended to deliver the address in person before a joint session of Congress. However, the president was recovering from the flu, so he instead submitted the address to Congress as a written message. Roosevelt read the speech that night for a radio audience and assembled newsreel cameramen from the Diplomatic Reception Room of the White House as a fireside chat.

Roosevelt outlined his vision for the postwar world, emphasizing the need for both military victory and lasting peace built on economic and social security.

A central feature of the address was Roosevelt's proposal for a "Second Bill of Rights," aimed at guaranteeing economic security for all Americans. Among these were the rights to adequate medical care, a good education, and economic protections against unemployment and poverty. Roosevelt declared, "Necessitous men are not free men," linking economic security to individual freedom.

Roosevelt also addressed the pressing needs of wartime production, urging Congress to enact measures like a national service law to mobilize resources fully and avoid complacency in the war effort. He cautioned against "rightist reaction" that could undermine democracy at home even as the U.S. fought fascism abroad.

The address set the stage for postwar reforms and articulated the principles that would influence U.S. domestic and foreign policy in the ensuing decades.

Preceded by 1943 State of the Union Address	State of the Union addresses 1944	Succeeded by 1945 State of the Union Address
