= 1940 State of the Union Address =

Speech by US President Franklin D. Roosevelt

- Date: January 3, 1940
- Venue: House Chamber, United States Capitol
- Location: Washington, D.C.; 38°53′23″N 77°00′32″W
- Type: State of the Union Address
- Participants: Franklin D. Roosevelt; John Nance Garner; William B. Bankhead
- Previous: 1939 State of the Union Address
- Next: 1941 State of the Union Address

The 1940 State of the Union Address was given by the 32nd president of the United States, Franklin D. Roosevelt, on Wednesday, January 3, 1940, to both houses of 76th United States Congress. It was given after World War II had begun, but before the fall of France, and about a year before the United States entered the war; He said, "You are well aware that dictatorships--and the philosophy of force that justifies and accompanies dictatorships--have originated in almost every case in the necessity for drastic action to improve internal conditions in places where democratic action for one reason or another has failed to respond to modern needs and modern demands."

Notably the President mentions the Trade Agreements Act towards the advancement of fair global trade. Additionally the President noted he subscribed to George Washington's policy against "entangling foreign alliances."

== See also ==
- 1940 United States presidential election

| Preceded by 1939 State of the Union Address | State of the Union addresses 1940 | Succeeded by 1941 State of the Union Address (Four Freedoms speech) |
