= Fair Deal =

Domestic agenda of U.S. President Harry S. Truman (1945–53)

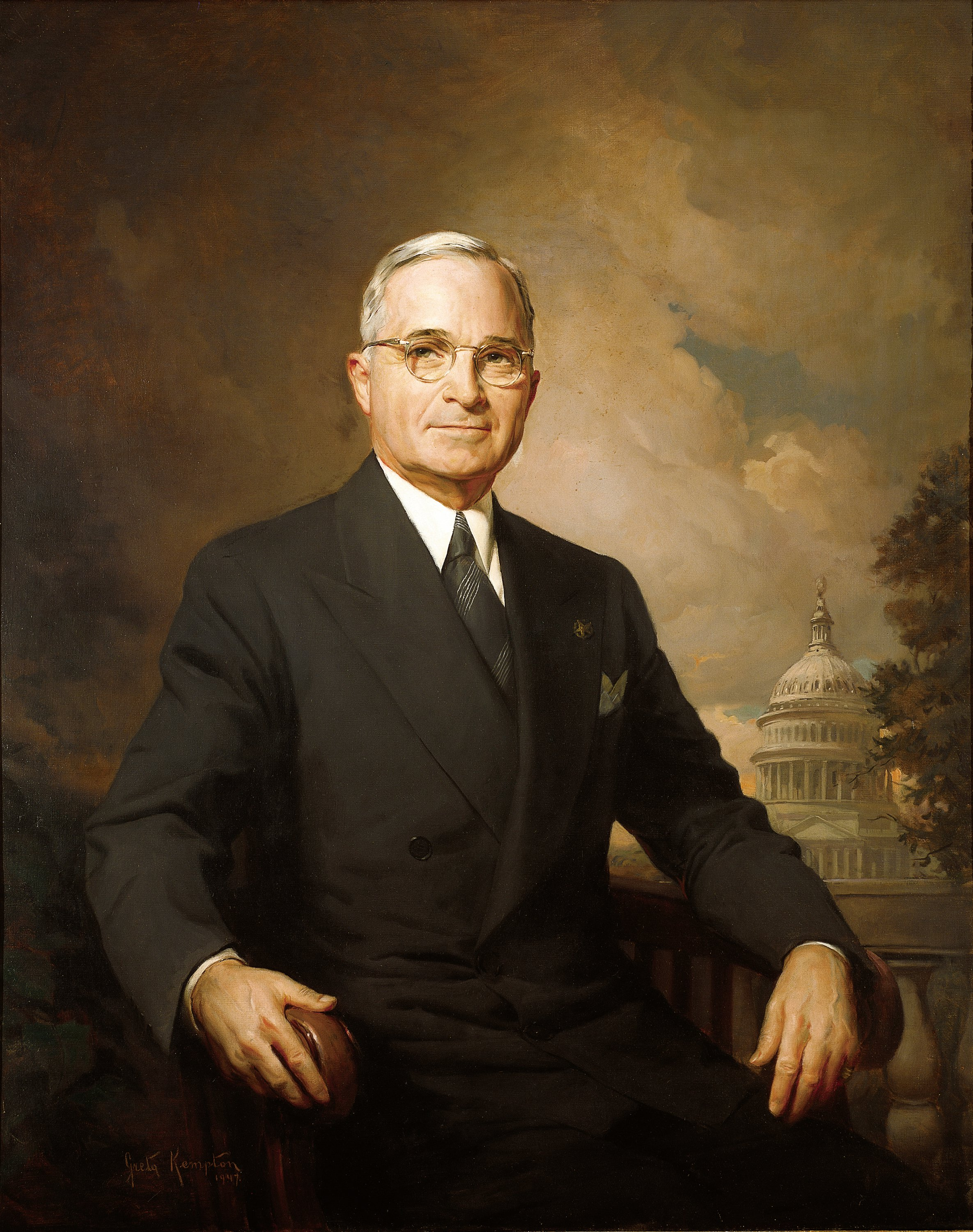
President Harry S. Truman's Official Presidential Portrait, 1947

The Fair Deal was a set of proposals put forward by U.S. president Harry S. Truman to Congress in 1945 and in his January 1949 State of the Union Address. More generally, the term characterizes the entire domestic agenda of the Truman administration, from 1945 to 1953. It offered new proposals to continue New Deal liberalism, but with a conservative coalition controlling Congress during most of Truman's presidency, only a few of its major initiatives became law and then only if they had considerable Republican Party support. As Richard Neustadt concludes, the most important proposals were aid to education, national health insurance, the Fair Employment Practices Commission, and repeal of the Taft–Hartley Act. They were all debated at length, then voted down. Nevertheless, enough smaller and less controversial items passed that liberals could claim some success.

The Korean War made military spending the nation's priority and killed almost the entire Fair Deal, but did encourage the pursuit of economic growth. Some of the Fair Deal's progressive policies were enacted piecemeal by legislation during Truman's time in office, and further enactments continued under the Eisenhower and Kennedy administrations, culminating in the sweeping tide of progressive legislation under Lyndon Johnson's Great Society agenda.

== Philosophy ==
A liberal Democrat of the Midwestern populist tradition, Truman was determined to both continue the legacy of the New Deal and to make Franklin Roosevelt's proposed Economic Bill of Rights a reality, while making his own mark on social policy.

In a scholarly article published in 1972, historian Alonzo Hamby argued that the Fair Deal reflected the "vital center" approach to liberalism which rejected totalitarianism, was suspicious of excessive concentrations of government power, and "idealized the New Deal as an effort to establish a mixed economy that would preserve the essentials of capitalism while mitigating its abuses." Solidly based upon the New Deal tradition in its advocacy of wide-ranging social legislation, the Fair Deal differed enough to claim a separate identity. The Great Depression did not return in the post-war era and the Fair Deal had to contend with prosperity and an optimistic future. The Fair Dealers thought in terms of abundance rather than the Depression era's scarcity.

Economist Leon Keyserling argued that the liberal task was to spread the benefits of abundance throughout society by stimulating economic growth. Agriculture Secretary Charles F. Brannan wanted to unleash the benefits of agricultural abundance and to encourage the development of an urban-rural Democratic coalition. However, the Brannan Plan was defeated by strong conservative opposition in the United States Congress, his unrealistic confidence in the possibility of uniting urban labor, and by farm owners who distrusted rural insurgency. The Korean War made military spending the nation's priority and thwarted some Fair Deal proposals, but did stimulate economic growth.

Following the midterm elections in 1948, the House acquired a liberal majority, but the Senate remained under conservative control, as noted by The Elevator Constructor in 1949:

First of all, only one-third of the Senate is up for election every two years. In spite of the fact that the House has a narrow liberal majority, there are only 38 votes in the Senate wholeheartedly committed to the liberal program endorsed by the American voters last November.

== 1945 proposals ==
In September 1945, Truman addressed Congress and presented a 21-point program of domestic legislation outlining a series of proposed actions in the fields of economic development and social welfare. The measures that Truman proposed to Congress included:

1. Major improvements in the coverage and adequacy of the unemployment compensation system.
2. Substantial increases in the minimum wage, together with broader coverage.
3. The maintenance and extension of price controls to keep down the cost of living in the transition to a peacetime economy.
4. A pragmatic approach towards drafting legislation eliminating wartime agencies and wartime controls, taking legal difficulties into account.
5. Legislation to ensure full employment.
6. Legislation to make the Fair Employment Practice Committee permanent.
7. The maintenance of relations with both industry and unions.
8. The extension of the United States Employment Service to provide jobs for demobilized military personnel.
9. Increased aid to farmers.
10. The removal of the restrictions on eligibility for voluntary enlistment and allowing the armed forces to enlist a greater number of volunteers.
11. The enactment of broad and comprehensive housing legislation.
12. The establishment of a single Federal research agency.
13. A major revision of the taxation system.
14. The encouragement of surplus-property disposal.
15. Greater levels of assistance to small businesses.
16. Improvements in federal aid to war veterans.
17. A major expansion of public works, conserving and building up natural resources.
18. The encouragement of post-war reconstruction and settling the obligations of the Lend-Lease Act.
19. The introduction of a decent pay scale for all Federal Government employees—executive, legislative, and judicial.
20. The promotion of the sale of ships to remove the uncertainty regarding the disposal of America's large surplus tonnage following the end of hostilities.
21. Legislation to bring about the acquisition and retention of stockpiles of materials necessary for meeting the defense needs of the nation.

Finally, Truman announced that he would soon "communicate with the Congress recommending a national health program to provide adequate medical care for all Americans and to protect them from financial loss and hardships resulting from illness and accident." (See the Healthcare section below.)

Truman did not send proposed legislation to Congress; he expected Congress to draft the bills. Many of these proposed reforms, however, were never realized due to the opposition of the conservative majority in Congress, further solidified after the Republicans took control of both houses in the 1946 midterm elections. Despite these setbacks, Truman's proposals to Congress became more and more abundant over the course of his presidency, and by 1948 a legislative program that was more comprehensive came to be known as the "Fair Deal".

== 1949 proposals ==
In his 1949 State of the Union address to Congress on January 5, 1949, Truman stated that "Every segment of our population, and every individual, has a right to expect from his government a fair deal." The proposed measures included:

- federal aid to education,
- a large tax cut for low-income earners
- the abolition of poll taxes
- an anti-lynching law
- a permanent Fair Employment Practices Commission
- a farm aid program
- increased public housing
- an immigration bill
- new TVA-style public works projects
- the establishment of a new Department of Welfare
- the repeal of the Taft–Hartley Act, regulating the activities of labor unions
- an increase in the minimum wage from 40 to 75 cents an hour
- national health insurance
- expanded Social Security coverage, and
- a $4 billion tax increase to reduce the national debt and finance these programs.

Despite a mixed record of legislative success, the Fair Deal remains significant in establishing the call for universal health care as a rallying cry for the Democratic Party. Lyndon B. Johnson credited Truman's unfulfilled program as influencing Great Society measures such as Medicare that Johnson successfully pushed through Congress during the 1960s.

== Opposition and progress ==
The Fair Deal reforms helped to transform the United States from a wartime economy to a peacetime economy. In the context of postwar reconstruction and the Cold War, the Fair Deal sought to preserve and extend the liberal tradition of President Franklin Delano Roosevelt's New Deal. However, the Fair Deal faced much opposition from the many conservative politicians who wanted a reduced role of the federal government. During these postwar years, the nation enjoyed a return to prosperity not seen since before the Great Depression, and support for conservative politicians grew.

The Fair Deal faced opposition by a coalition of conservative Republicans and predominantly southern conservative Democrats. However, despite strong opposition, there were elements of Truman's agenda that did win congressional approval, such as the public housing subsidies cosponsored by Republican Robert A. Taft under the 1949 National Housing Act, which funded slum clearance and the construction of 810,000 units of low-income housing over a period of six years.

Truman was also helped by the election of a Democratic Congress in 1948. According to Eric Leif Davin, the 1949–50 Congress 'was the most liberal Congress since 1938 and produced more "New-Deal-Fair Deal" legislation than any Congress between 1938 and Johnson's Great Society of the mid-1960s." As noted by political scientist Richard Neustadt, a former adviser to President Truman:

This was the Congress that reformed the Displaced Persons Act, increased the minimum wage, doubled the hospital construction program, authorized the National Science Foundation and the rural telephone program, suspended the 'sliding scale' on price supports, extended the soil conservation program, provided new grants for planning state and local public works and plugged the long-standing merger loophole in the Clayton Act...Moreover, as protector, as defender, wielder of the veto against encroachments on the liberal preserve, Truman left a record of considerable success – an aspect of the Fair Deal not to be discounted.

Although Truman was unable to implement his Fair Deal program in its entirety, a great deal of social and economic progress took place in the late forties and early fifties. A census report confirmed that gains in housing, education, living standards, and income under the Truman administration were unparalleled in American history.By 1953, 62 million Americans had jobs, a gain of 11 million in seven years, while unemployment had all but vanished. Farm income, dividends, and corporate income were at all-time highs, and there had not been a failure of an insured bank in nearly nine years. The minimum wage had also been increased while Social Security benefits had been doubled, and eight million veterans had attended college by the end of the Truman administration as a result of the G.I. Bill, which subsidized the businesses, training, education, and housing of millions of returning veterans.

Millions of homes had been financed through previous government programs, and a start was made in slum clearance. Poverty was also significantly reduced, with one estimate suggesting that the percentage of Americans living in poverty had fallen from 33% of the population in 1949 to 28% by 1952. Incomes had risen faster than prices, which meant that real living standards were considerably higher than seven years earlier. Progress had also been made in civil rights, with the desegregation of both the federal civil Service and the armed forces and the creation of the President's Committee on Civil Rights. In fact, according to one historian, Truman had "done more than any President since Lincoln to awaken American conscience to the issues of civil rights".

== Legislation and programs ==
Note: This listing contains reforms drawn up by the Truman Administration together with reforms drawn up by individual Congressmen. The latter have been included because it is arguable that the progressive nature of these reforms (such as the Water Pollution Law, which was partly a Republican initiative) was compatible with the liberalism of the Fair Deal.

=== Civil rights ===
As Senator, Truman had not supported the nascent Civil Rights Movement. In a 1947 speech to the National Association for the Advancement of Colored People (NAACP), which marked the first time a sitting president had ever addressed the group, Truman said "Every man should have the right to a decent home, the right to an education, the right to adequate medical care, the right to a worthwhile job, the right to an equal share in the making of public decisions through the ballot, and the right to a fair trial in a fair court."

As President, he put forward many civil rights programs but they were met with a lot of resistance by southern Democrats. All his legislative proposals were blocked. However, he used presidential executive orders to end discrimination in the armed forces and denied government contracts to firms with racially discriminatory practices. He also named African Americans to federal posts. Except for nondiscrimination provisions of the Housing Act of 1949, Truman had to be content with civil rights' gains achieved by executive order or through the federal courts. Vaughan argues that by continuing appeals to Congress for civil rights legislation, Truman helped reverse the long acceptance of segregation and discrimination by establishing integration as a moral principle.

=== Healthcare ===
On November 19, 1945, Truman sent a Special Message to Congress recommending the adoption and funding of "a comprehensive and modern health program for the Nation, consisting of five major parts":

- Construction of hospitals and related facilities
- Expansion of public health, maternal, and child care services
- Medical education and research
- Prepayment of medical costs through a compulsory national health insurance program, covering medical, hospital, nursing, and laboratory services
- Protection against loss of wages through sickness and disability through a national disability insurance program

On the same day, New York Senator Robert F. Wagner introduced S. 1606, known as the Wagner-Murray-Dingell Bill, containing legislative provisions to enact Truman's national health program into law. After intense debates in Congress, the bill failed to pass.

However, a number of other public-health initiatives were enacted during Truman's presidency:

- A bill was signed which authorized federal agencies to provide minor medical and dental services to employees (1945).
- The National Mental Health Act (1946) authorized federal support for mental health research and treatment programs.
- The Water Pollution Law (1948) provided funds for sewage treatment system and pollution research while empowering the Justice Department to file suit against polluters.
- The Federal Insecticide, Fungicide and Rodenticide Act (1947) introduced regulations on the use of pesticide in food production.
- The Hill-Burton Act (Hospital Survey and Construction Act) (1946) established a federal program of financial assistance for the modernization and construction of hospital facilities. The program brought national standards and financing to local hospitals, and raised standards of medical care throughout the United States during the course of the 1950s and 1960s. While the legislation favored middle-class communities because it required local financial contributions, it channeled federal funds to poor communities, thus raising hospital standards and equity in access to quality care. The program required hospitals assisted by federal funding to provide emergency treatment to the uninsured and a reasonable volume of free or reduced cost care to poor Americans.
- The Hospital Survey and Construction Amendments of 1949 raised the amount of federal funding available and raised the federal share of hospital construction to two-thirds. These amendments made it possible for less-wealthy communities to benefit from the Hill-Burton Act of 1946.
- A program was established to fund payments to medical vendors for care of aged persons on low incomes (1950).
- Funding was authorized for research and demonstration relating to the coordination, utilization, and development of hospital services.
- Grants to states for cancer control were introduced (1947).
- The Omnibus Medical Research Act (1950) authorized the establishment of the Institute of Neurological Diseases and Blindness and the transmutation of the Experimental Biology and medical Institute into the much larger Institute of Arthritis and Metabolic Diseases. The legislation also empowered the Surgeon General to establish additional institutes when he felt that they were necessary, and also to 'conduct and support research and research training relating to other diseases and groups of diseases.'
- The Atomic Energy Commission was directed by Congress to investigate the application of atomic research to cancer therapies, providing some $5 million for this purpose (1950).
- A Clinical and Laboratory Research Center was established (1947).
- The research construction provisions of the Appropriations Act for FY 1948 provided funds "for the acquisition of a site, and the preparation of plans, specifications, and drawings, for additional research buildings and a 600-bed clinical research hospital and necessary accessory buildings related thereto to be used in general medical research ...."
- The National Heart Act (1948) authorized the National Heart Institute to assist, conduct, and foster research, provide training, and to provide help to the states in the diagnosis, prevention, and treatment of heart disease.
- The National Institute of Dental Research was authorized by the National Dental Research Act (1948) to "conduct, assist, and foster dental research; provide training; and cooperate with the states in the prevention and control of dental diseases."
- A National Institute of Arthritis and Metabolic Diseases was established (1950).
- A National Institute of Neurological Diseases and Blindness was established (1950).
- The Durham-Humphrey Amendment (1951) defined "the kinds of drugs that cannot be safely used without medical supervision and restricts their sale to prescription by a licensed practitioner."

=== Welfare ===
Under Truman, many adjustments were made to the social welfare system, although one of his key aims, to extend Social Security coverage to 25 million Americans, was never accomplished. Despite this, 10 million received Social Security coverage.

- The Federal Railroad Disability Insurance program was enacted (1946).
- The Social Security Act was amended (1950) to provide a new category of state aid to the totally and permanently disabled.
- Throughout 1950, more than thirty major changes were made to Social Security. Compulsory coverage was extended to residents of Puerto Rico and the Virgin Islands, federal employees not covered by federal pensions, domestic servants, most self-employed workers, and agricultural workers. State and local government workers were provided with the option of joining the system. Survivor's benefits were increased and expanded, and Social Security benefits were increased significantly for current beneficiaries by 77.5%. Changes were also made to increase the progressivity of benefits. Another amendment granted wage credits toward all Social Security benefits for military service performed between September 1940 and July 1947.
- The Aid to Families with Dependent Children program was expanded to include support for caregivers (1950).
- Grants to states for public assistance to needy individuals, those who were totally and permanently disabled, and also to maternal and child welfare services, were broadened and increased.
- The Displaced Persons Act admitted individuals who were victims of persecution by the Nazi government.
- The admissions numbers for displaced persons were doubled to 400,000 (1950).
- Federal financial participation of public assistance payments was increased (1946).
- Compulsory contribution to Social Security was expanded (in principle) to all dependent employees and workers (1946).
- The Federal Unemployment Tax Act (FUTA) was amended in 1946 to permit states where employees made contributions under the unemployment insurance program to use some or all of these contributions for the payment of disability benefits.
- The Social Security Act was amended in 1946 to provide survivor benefits to the dependents of World War II veterans who died within three years of having been discharged from the military. The amendments considered veterans of the Second World War to be fully insured under Social Security for purposes of survivor benefits, even if they had not completed the required number of quarters of covered employment under Social Security.
- The Civil Service Retirement Act was amended (1948) to provide protection for the survivors of Federal employees.
- The Civil Service Retirement Act of 1930 was amended (1945) to provide retirement credit, in computing length of service, to persons who left Government service to enter the armed forces.
- The Internal Revenue Code and the Social Security Act were amended (1945) in order to extend coverage to all employees of the Bonneville Power Administration who were not covered under the Federal Civil Service Retirement Act and therefore had no retirement protection.
- The Railroad Unemployment Insurance Act and Railroad Retirement Act amendments (1946) established monthly survivor benefits and sickness and maternity benefits for railroad employees. The Social Security Act was also amended by the provision making wages in railroad employment applicable for survivor benefits under the old-age and survivors insurance program.
- The Social Security Act was amended (1946) to provide coverage to private maritime employees under State unemployment insurance, monthly benefits under old age and survivors insurance for survivors of certain World War II veterans, and temporary unemployment benefits to seamen with wartime Federal employment. Permission was given to States, with employee contributions under their unemployment insurance laws, to use such funds for temporary disability insurance benefits. There would also be greater Federal sharing in public assistance payments for a specified period, and larger grants were to be provided for maternal and child health and child welfare, as well as the extension of these programs to the Virgin Islands.
- A bill was approved (1947) which extended to July 1949 the time in which income from nursing service and agricultural labor could be disregarded in making old age assistance payments.
- A law as passed (1947) under which certain aged recipients of assistance could continue, until July 1949, to care for the sick or work for wages on a farm without having such wages jeopardize their assistance payment.
- The Railroad Retirement Act was amended (1948) to increase certain survivor and retirement benefits.
- A law was passed (1948) which raised railroad pensions by 20%, yet reduced taxes on payrolls.
- A law was passed (1948) which increased certain benefits payable under the Longshoremen's and Harbor Workers Compensation Act.
- A law was approved (1949) which authorized appropriations for the Federal Security Administrator to meet the emergency needs of crippled children for fiscal year 1949, in addition to funds authorized under the Social Security Act.
- Increases in Social Security benefits were authorized (1948).
- An act for the rehabilitation of the Navajo and Hopi tribes of Indians was approved (1950), which included a provision to increase the Federal participation in public assistance payments.
- The Social Security Act of 1950 increased welfare benefits, extended the coverage of Social Security to elderly Americans, and raised the minimum wage. These benefits appealed to both middle-class and working-class Americans. Farm and domestic employees and nonfarm self-employed persons came to be covered for first time under the Social Security Old-Age Insurance pension program. As a result of these changes, an additional 10.5 million Americans were covered by Social Security. According to one historian the 1950 act "was almost as significant as the original 1935 legislation."
- In September 1950, benefits began to be paid to dependent husbands, dependent widowers, wives under the age of sixty-five with children in their care, and divorced wives.
- A law was signed (1952) which increased sickness and unemployment benefits for railroad workers by 30% to 60%, and was financed by a payroll levy on the railroads.
- The Social Security Act was amended (1952) to extend for another year "the time within which State Governments could make agreements that were retroactive to January 1, 1951, for old-age and survivors insurance coverage of State and local Government employees".
- The Federal Property and Administrative Services Act (1949) provided the Federal Security Administrator with the authority to dispose of surplus Federal property to nonprofit or tax-supported educational institutions for health or educational purposes.
- The Social Security Act of 1952 increased benefits under the old-age and survivors insurance program, extended the period of wage credits for military service through December 31, 1953, liberalized the retirement test and raised the retirement test from $50 to $75 a month. The legislation also changed, for a two-year period, the grant formula for public assistance payments in order to make additional funds available to the States.
- Social Security coverage was extended to farm workers (1951).
- Unemployment coverage was extended.
- A bill was passed (1952) which raised Social Security benefits by 12.5%.

=== Labor ===
A centerpiece of the Fair Deal—the repeal of the Taft–Hartley Act—failed to pass. As Plotke notes, "By the early 1950s repeal of Taft–Hartley was only a symbolic Democratic platform statement."

- A new Fair Labor Standards Act established a 75-cent-an-hour minimum wage.
- The Employment Act of 1946 created a clear legal obligation on the part of the federal government to use all practical means 'to promote maximum employment, production, and purchasing power.' The Act also established "the basic core of machinery for such economic planning – the Council of Economic Advisers working directly for the President, and the joint Committee on the Economic report in Congress." Under the Employment Act, within two decades following its passage, swift measures taken by the Federal Reserve authorities and by the administration in charge held in check four recessions, those of 1948–49, 1953–54, 1957–58, and 1960–61.
- The Office of Economic Stabilization was re-established (1946) in an effort to control rising prices.
- The Federal Employees Pay Act (1946) brought about a 14% increase in the base pay of most Government workers whose positions were subjected to the Classification Act of 1923.
- The Fair Labor Standards Amendments of 1949 introduced various provisions designed to "assure the health, efficiency and general well-being of workers."
- The Federal Employees' Compensation Act Amendments of 1949 broadened the coverage of the act while increasing benefits.
- The Wagner-Peyser Act was extended to Puerto Rico and the Virgin Islands.
- Moderate tax relief for low-income earners was passed by Congress.
- The first code of federal regulations for mine safety was authorized by Congress (1947).
- The Federal Coal Mine Safety Act of 1952 provided for annual inspections in certain underground coal mines, and provided the Bureau with limited enforcement authority, including the power to issue violation notices and imminent danger withdrawal orders. The Act also authorized the assessment of civil penalties against mine operators for refusing to give inspectors access to mine property or for noncompliance with withdrawal orders, although no provision was made for monetary penalties for noncompliance with the safety provisions.
- Child labor was finally prohibited through an amendment to the Fair Labor Standards Act(1949).
- The number of employees covered by the federal minimum wage was increased.
- The Judiciary and Judicial Procedure Act of 1948 prohibited employers from intimidating, discharging, threatening to discharge, or coercing permanent employees for serving jury duty.
- A previous Railway Labour Act was amended by a law effective January the 10th 1951, "to permit carriers and employees covered by the act to bargain collectively for a union shop and check-off of union dues."
- A law of January 10, 1951, as noted by one study, "authorized deductions pursuant to the written consent of seamen, to be held in trust for the establishment of benefits for the sole use of seamen or their families for the purpose of providing medical and hospital care, retirement or survivors' pensions, life insurance, unemployment benefits, and sickness or disability benefits."
- The McGuire Act (1952) strengthened fair trade laws by enabling manufacturers to extend price maintenance even to retailers "who refused to sign contracts."

=== Education ===
As Donaldson notes, the major proposal for large-scale federal aid to education "died quickly, mostly over whether aid should be given to private schools."

- The National School Lunch and Milk Act (1946) established school lunch programs across the United States, with the purpose of safeguarding "the health and well-being of the nation's children and to encourage the consumption of agricultural abundance". This legislation introduced the provision of commodity donations and federal grants for non-profit milk and lunches in private and public schools. The program had the strong support of conservative Congressmen from rural districts.
- The George-Barden Act (1946) expanded federal support for vocational education.
- The Fulbright Program was established (1946), becoming one of the "world's largest and most respected cooperative educational programs for the interchange of graduate students, teachers, and scholars."
- The National Science Foundation was established to support education and research in science.
- The School Construction Act (Public Law 815) authorized a 3-year program "calling for the construction of critically needed school facilities in those school districts overburdened by Federal activities."
- The Federal Impacted Areas Aid Program (1950) authorized federal aid to school districts in which "large numbers of federal employees and tax-exempt federal property create either a substantial increase in public school enrollments or a significant reduction in local property tax revenues."
- Long-term low-interest loans to colleges for dormitory construction were authorized (1950).
- Following the outbreak of the Korean War aid was provided for current expenses and for the construction of additional school facilities in districts which had become centers of wartime activity and were overwhelmed by the arrival of military personnel and their families.
- $96.5 million was appropriated for school construction under P.L. 81-815 (1950).
- The federal government funded scholarships and loans for nursing students and provided aid to medical schools in order to meet the growing need for caregivers.
- $23 million was appropriated for school operating expenses under P.L. 81-874 (1950).

=== Housing ===
During the Truman years, the role of the federal government in the field of housing provision was extended, with one major reform in particular (the Housing Act of 1949) passed with the support of the conservative senator Robert A. Taft.

- The Housing Act of 1949 was a major legislative accomplishment stemming from the collaboration of the Fair Deal supporters with conservative leader Senator Taft. This led to the allocation of federal funds to go towards 800,000 units of public housing.
- The Federal Housing and Rent Act (1947) was passed to encourage the construction of new rental housing in cities.
- In July 1947, the 1937 Housing Act was amended to prohibit (as noted by one study) “eviction of over-income tenants from low-rent public housing if the eviction would result in undue hardship.”
- The Housing and Rent Act (1949) extended federal rent control authority.
- The Farmers Home Administration was established (1946) to assist self-help rural housing groups as well as to make grants and loans for the repair and construction of rural homes.
- More money was provided for farm housing.
- The Federal Housing Administration's mortgage insurance programs were liberalized, authorizing a program of limited technical research and setting up a new program for guaranteeing a minimum yield on direct investments in housing.
- The Housing Act of 1950 enlarged and liberalized the loan guarantee privileges of Second World War veterans by administering a direct loan program for those veterans who were unable to acquire private home financing. The legislation also authorized a program of mortgage insurance for co-operative housing projects, a program of technical aid, and a new program of mortgage insurance for low-priced new rural housing.
- The Housing and Home Finance Agency was established (1947), promising co-ordination of the principal nonfarm housing functions of the federal government.
- Rent controls were extended (1951) to cover previously exempted categories.
- Funds were provided for slum clearance and urban renewal.
- Appropriations for the Farmer's Home Administration were increased (1950).

=== Veterans ===
Veterans benefits were non-controversial, and won support from left and right.

- The Veterans' regulations were amended (1945) to provide increased rates of pension for certain service-incurred disabilities, generally on a parity with rates payable for similar disabilities under the World War I Veterans' Act, 1924, as amended.
- The Veteran's Readjustment Assistance Act (1952) included provisions for unemployment compensation for veterans under a uniform Federal formula.
- Legislation was approved (1952) which increased veteran's compensation and pension rates.
- A law was signed (1949), which extended for one year to June 1950 reconversion and unemployment benefits for seamen provided by Title XIII of the Social Security Act.
- $3.7 billion was spent of GI benefits from 1945 to 1949.
- The Social Security Act was amended (1952) to grant wage credits toward Social Security benefits for each month of military service after July 1947 and before January 1954.
- Laws were enacting permitting the payment to veterans of retroactive benefits during hospitalization, while a time extension was enacted for filling in certain cases claiming benefit and compensation.

=== Agriculture ===
Dean shows that the major Fair Deal initiative, the "Brannan Plan" proposed by Secretary of Agriculture Brannan, failed in Congress because Truman delayed too long in presenting it before Congress and it lost initiative and because he never consulted with top leaders in farm legislation. A separate Anderson Act was signed in 1949 that had more in common with the Republican-sponsored Agricultural Act of 1948 than Secretary Brannan's plan did.

- A Conservation of Wildlife Act was passed (1946) to protect wildlife resources.
- The Research and Marketing Act of 1946 increased funds for agricultural research.
- The Farmers Commodity Credit Corporation Charter Act (1948) stabilized, supported and protected farm incomes and prices, assisted in maintaining adequate supplies, and facilitated an orderly distribution of commodities.
- The Agricultural Act (1948) introduced a more flexible system of price supports.
- The Agricultural Act (1949) maintained price supports at 90% of parity. The Act also made certain donated commodities acquired through price-support operations by the Commodity Credit Corporation (CCC) available for distribution to local public welfare organizations serving poor Americans, the Bureau of Indian Affairs, and school lunch programs. It also authorized the CCC "to pay for added processing, packaging, and handling costs for foods acquired under price support so that recipient outlets could more fully use them".
- The Disaster Loan Act (1949) made farmers who experienced severe crop losses due to natural disasters eligible for special low-interest loans.
- A loan program was authorized (1949) for expanding and improving rural telephone facilities.
- The REA and soil-conservation programs were expanded.

=== Federal reclamation and power projects ===
Truman's Fair Deal reclamation program called for expanded public distribution of federally produced electric power and endorsed restrictions on the amount of land an owner could irrigate from federal water projects. Lobbying efforts by privately owned power companies prevented the spread of public utilities. Political pressure and conflicts with the Budget Bureau and the Army Corps of Engineers kept the Bureau of Reclamation from enforcing the excess land law.

- Rural electrification and public power were extended.
- New conservation projects were initiated.
- Funds for the Tennessee Valley Authority were significantly increased.
- Funds were provided for western land reclamation.
- Funds were provided for hydroelectric power stations.
- Flood control developments were expanded.
- Some money was spent on public works.
- Appropriations for the Tennessee Valley Authority and the Rural Electrification Administration were increased (1950).
- Funding for the Reclamation Bureau's hydroelectric, water control, and irrigation projects in the west was increased.

== See also ==
- Economic Bill of Rights – proposed by President Franklin Roosevelt in 1944
- New Deal – Franklin Roosevelt's signature program of economic reforms during the Great Depression
- The New Freedom – President Wilson's proposed tariff, business, and banking reforms
- New Nationalism – Proposed by ex-President Theodore Roosevelt during his 1912 run for office as a Progressive Party candidate; included provision for a national health service
- Square Deal – President Theodore Roosevelt's proposals to conserve national resources, control corporate excesses, and protect consumers
