= 1948 State of the Union Address =

Speech by US President Harry S. Truman

- Date: January 7, 1948
- Time: 1:30 p.m. EST
- Venue: House Chamber, United States Capitol
- Location: Washington, D.C.; 38°53′23″N 77°00′32″W
- Type: State of the Union Address
- Participants: Harry S. Truman; Arthur Vandenberg; Joseph W. Martin Jr.
- Previous: 1947 State of the Union Address
- Next: 1949 State of the Union Address

The 1948 State of the Union Address was given by Harry S. Truman, the 33rd president of the United States, on Wednesday, January 7, 1948, to the 80th United States Congress in the chamber of the United States House of Representatives. It was Truman's third State of the Union Address. Presiding over this joint session was House speaker Joseph W. Martin Jr., accompanied by Senate president pro tempore Arthur Vandenberg. Even though Truman's previous 1947 State of the Union Address had been televised, this address was only broadcast nationwide over the radio.

Truman opened his speech by reflecting on what he considered to be the true strengths of the United States:

The elements of our strength are many. They include our democratic government, our economic system, our great natural resources. But these are only partial explanations. The basic source of our strength is spiritual. For we are a people with a faith. We believe in the dignity of man. We believe that he was created in the image of the Father of us all. We do not believe that men exist merely to strengthen the state or to be cogs in the economic machine. We do believe that governments are created to serve the people and that economic systems exist to minister to their wants. We have a profound devotion to the welfare and rights of the individual as a human being. The faith of our people has particular meaning at this time in history because of the unsettled and changing state of the world.

During his speech, Truman laid out a number of domestic policy proposals. He called for Alaska and Hawaii to be admitted to the union. He also called for increased civil rights measures:

Today, however, some of our citizens are still denied equal opportunity for education, for jobs and economic advancement, and for the expression of their views at the polls. Most serious of all, some are denied equal protection under laws. Whether discrimination is based on race, or creed, or color, or land of origin, it is utterly contrary to American ideals of democracy.

Truman spent time advocating that Social Security benefits be extended and increased. He also pushed for national health insurance, rent control, the creation of a new executive department to administer health and education programs, conserving natural resources, and reforestation. Truman also focused on economic issues to help working families by introducing a cost of living tax credit, increasing the minimum wage from 40 to 75 cents per hour, and helping farmers by continuing price supports for major farm commodities and extending rural electrification. Truman also noted that Congress in 1947 had overridden his veto and passed the Taft-Hartley act but that his opinion on the legislation had not changed. Truman also spent time discussing means to achieve a peaceful world through support of the United Nations and other foreign aid programs.

Truman concluded his speech by reminding the nation of its "high purposes" and calling for remembrance of "the fundamentals" as the world looked to the United States for leadership:

As we do so, let us keep ever before us our high purposes. We are determined that every citizen of this Nation shall have an equal right and an equal opportunity to grow in wisdom and in stature (Note: This is an allusion to Luke 2:52.) and to take his place in the control of his Nation's destiny.... It is our faith in human dignity that underlies these purposes. It is this faith that keeps us a strong and vital people. This is a time to remind ourselves of these fundamentals. For today the whole world looks to us for leadership. This is the hour to rededicate ourselves to the faith in mankind that makes us strong. This is the hour to rededicate ourselves to the faith in God that gives us confidence as we face the challenge of the years ahead.

== See also ==
- 1948 United States presidential election

Preceded by 1947 State of the Union Address	State of the Union addresses 1948	Succeeded by 1949 State of the Union Address
