= 1942 State of the Union Address =

Speech by US President Franklin D. Roosevelt

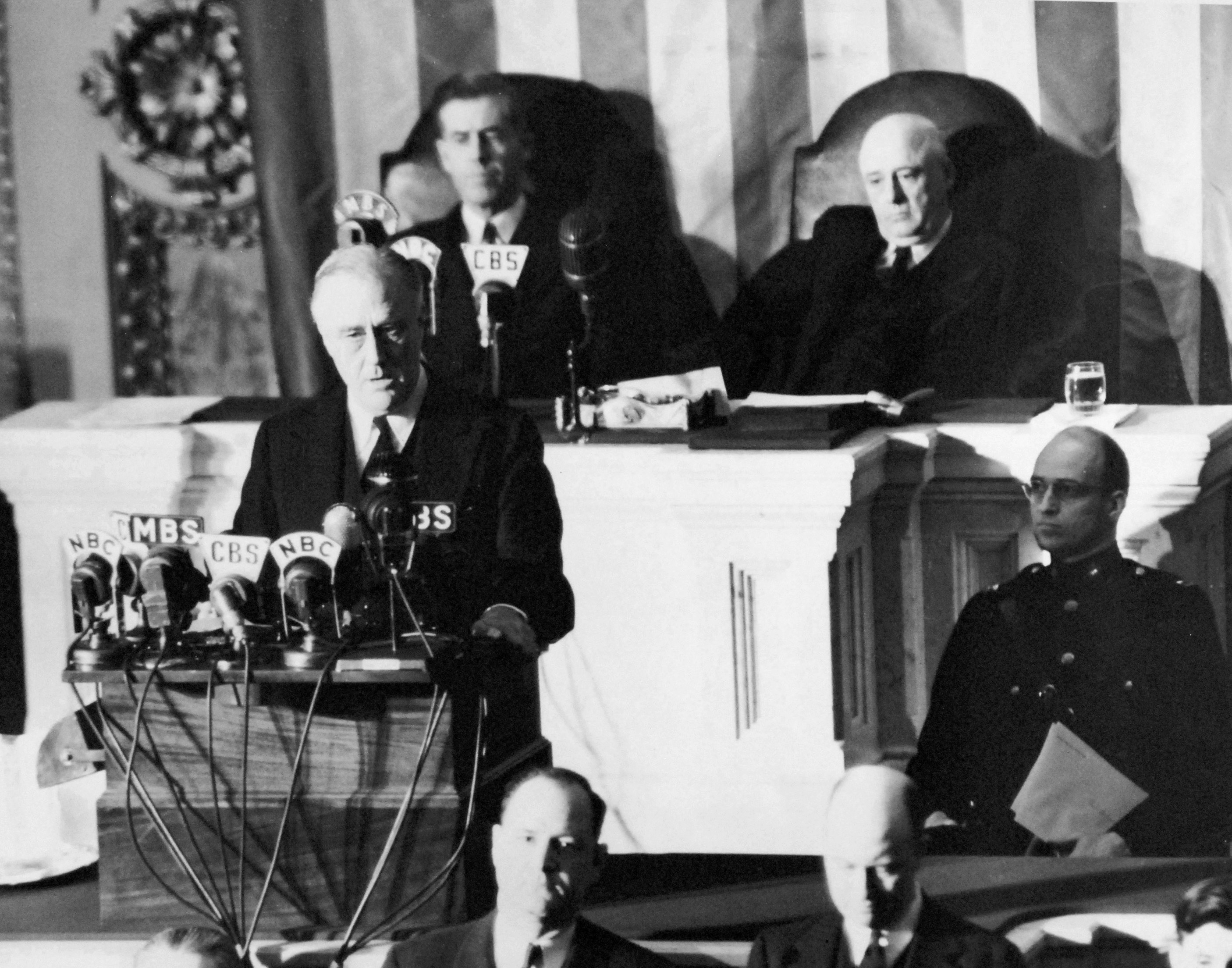
- President Franklin Delano Roosevelt delivers his "Day of Infamy" speech to Congress on December 8, 1941. Behind him are Vice President Henry Wallace (left) and Speaker of the House Sam Rayburn. To the right, in uniform in front of Rayburn, is Roosevelt's son James, who escorted his father to the Capitol.
- Date: January 6, 1942
- Duration: 40 minutes
- Venue: House Chamber, United States Capitol
- Location: Washington, D.C.
- Type: State of the Union Address
- Participants: Franklin D. Roosevelt; Henry A. Wallace; Sam Rayburn
- Previous: 1941 State of the Union Address
- Next: 1943 State of the Union Address

The 1942 State of the Union Address was delivered by President Franklin D. Roosevelt on January 6, 1942, just one month after the attack on Pearl Harbor that brought the United States into World War II. Roosevelt's address focused on the wartime mobilization of the nation and emphasized the need for unity and determination in the face of global conflict.

Roosevelt declared that "the spirit of the American people was never higher than it is today", praising the unity and resolve of the nation following the attack. He highlighted the growing alliance among the United Nations—a term he introduced for the coalition of nations fighting the Axis powers—and outlined the shared military and economic efforts to defeat Nazi Germany, Fascist Italy, and Imperial Japan.

Roosevelt detailed the global ambitions of the Axis powers, particularly Japan, whose attack on Pearl Harbor marked the culmination of decades of expansionist policies. He traced the roots of Japan's aggression back to the war against China in 1894, the seizure of Manchuria in 1931, and the ongoing war in China since 1937. He linked this to the broader plans of conquest held by the Axis, stating that their ultimate goal was the destruction of democracy and world peace.

Roosevelt also emphasized the need for overwhelming military production, outlining ambitious targets for the construction of planes, tanks, ships, and other war materials. He stated, "The superiority of the United Nations in munitions and ships must be overwhelming," and urged the country to ramp up production, calling for the creation of 60,000 planes, 45,000 tanks, and 6 million tons of shipping in 1942 alone.

In a call for national unity, Roosevelt reminded Americans of the moral stakes of the war, framing it as a fight for the Four Freedoms: freedom of speech, freedom of worship, freedom from want, and freedom from fear. He emphasized that the war was a battle between good and evil, concluding that “only total victory can reward the champions of tolerance, and decency, and freedom, and faith.”

| Preceded by 1941 State of the Union Address | State of the Union addresses 1942 | Succeeded by 1943 State of the Union Address |
