= 1947 State of the Union Address =

Speech by US President Harry S. Truman

- Date: January 6, 1947
- Time: 1:00 p.m. EST
- Venue: House Chamber, United States Capitol
- Location: Washington, D.C.; 38°53′23″N 77°00′32″W
- Type: State of the Union Address
- Participants: Harry S. Truman; Arthur Vandenberg; Joseph W. Martin Jr.
- Previous: 1946 State of the Union Address
- Next: 1948 State of the Union Address

The 1947 State of the Union Address was given by Harry S. Truman, the 33rd president of the United States, on Monday, January 6, 1947, to the 80th United States Congress in the chamber of the United States House of Representatives. It was Truman's second State of the Union Address; however, it was his first State of the Union Address to be delivered as a speech to a joint session of the United States Congress. Presiding over this joint session was House speaker Joseph W. Martin Jr., accompanied by Senate president pro tempore Arthur Vandenberg.

This was the first State of the Union Address to be televised. Three days earlier, on January 3, the first live television broadcast from the House Chamber occurred during the opening session of the 80th Congress. Truman watched this broadcast on a special 10-inch television set installed in the Oval Office in preparation for his State of the Union Address which was also to be televised.

Preceded by 1946 State of the Union Address	State of the Union addresses 1947	Succeeded by 1948 State of the Union Address
