= 1949 State of the Union Address =

Speech by US President Harry S. Truman

- Date: January 5, 1949
- Time: 1:00 p.m. EST
- Venue: House Chamber, United States Capitol
- Location: Washington, D.C.; 38°53′23″N 77°00′32″W
- Type: State of the Union Address
- Participants: Harry S. Truman; Kenneth McKellar; Sam Rayburn
- Previous: 1948 State of the Union Address
- Next: 1950 State of the Union Address

The 1949 State of the Union Address was given by Harry S. Truman, the 33rd president of the United States, on Wednesday, January 5, 1949, to the 81st United States Congress in the chamber of the United States House of Representatives. It was Truman's fourth State of the Union Address. Presiding over this joint session was House speaker Sam Rayburn, accompanied by Senate president pro tempore Kenneth McKellar.

== Proposals ==
This speech is sometimes referred to as Truman's "Fair Deal" speech since in it he declared that "Every segment of our population and every individual has a right to expect from our Government a fair deal." The term Fair Deal came to encompass all of Truman's domestic policy agenda during his time in office. Many of the proposals made in this speech were ones that Truman had previously made to the previous Republican-majority Congress in his 1948 State of the Union Address. Truman reiterated many of them in this address since control of the Congress had shifted in the 1948 United States elections to Truman's Democratic Party. The domestic-policy proposals that Truman offered in this speech were wide-ranging and included the following:

- federal aid to education
- a tax cut for low-income earners
- civil rights laws he had proposed to previous Congresses
- a permanent Fair Employment Practices Commission
- a farm aid program
- increased public housing
- new TVA-style public works projects
- the establishment of a new Department of Health, Education, and Welfare
- the repeal of the Taft–Hartley Act, regulating the activities of labor unions
- an increase in the minimum wage from 40 to 75 cents an hour
- national health insurance
- expanded Social Security coverage
- a $4 billion tax increase to reduce the national debt and finance these programs.

== Conclusion ==
Truman concluded his speech by noting that the United States stood at a consequential place in history and urged the Congress to cooperate with him in rising to the task:

We stand at the opening of an era which can mean either great achievement or terrible catastrophe for ourselves and for all mankind. The strength of our Nation must continue to be used in the interest of all our people rather than a privileged few. It must continue to be used unselfishly in the struggle for world peace and the betterment of mankind the world over. This is the task before us.... Now, I am confident that the Divine Power which has guided us to this time of fateful responsibility and glorious opportunity will not desert us now. With that help from Almighty God which we have humbly acknowledged at every turning point in our national life, we shall be able to perform the great tasks which He now sets before us.

| Preceded by 1948 State of the Union Address | State of the Union addresses 1949 | Succeeded by 1950 State of the Union Address |
