= 1945 State of the Union Address =

Speech by US President Franklin D. Roosevelt

- Date: January 6, 1945
- Location: Washington, D.C.
- Type: State of the Union Address
- Participants: Franklin D. Roosevelt; Henry A. Wallace; Sam Rayburn
- Format: Written
- Previous: 1944 State of the Union Address
- Next: 1946 State of the Union Address

The 1945 State of the Union Address was given to the 79th United States Congress on Saturday, January 6, 1945, by the 32nd president of the United States, Franklin D. Roosevelt. It was Roosevelt’s final State of the Union Address, given during the final year of World War II. He stated, "In considering the State of the Union, the war and the peace that is to follow are naturally uppermost in the minds of all of us. This war must be waged--it is being waged--with the greatest and most persistent intensity. Everything we are and have is at stake. Everything we are and have will be given. American men, fighting far from home, have already won victories which the world will never forget. We have no question of the ultimate victory. We have no question of the cost. Our losses will be heavy. We and our allies will go on fighting together to ultimate total victory."

In speaking about the war, the President mentions the successful amphibious operation (D-Day) and the effect it had on the war. In terms of operations in the Pacific the President said:

In the Pacific during the past year, we have conducted the fastest-moving offensive in the history of modern warfare. We have driven the enemy back more than 3,000 miles across the Central Pacific. A year ago, our conquest of Tarawa was a little more than a month old.

A year ago, we were preparing for our invasion of Kwajalein, the second of our great strides across the Central Pacific to the Philippines.

A year ago, General MacArthur was still fighting in New Guinea almost 1,500 miles from his present position in the Philippine Islands.

We now have firmly established bases in the Mariana Islands, from which our Super fortresses bomb Tokyo itself—and will continue to blast Japan in ever-increasing numbers.

Japanese forces in the Philippines have been cut in two. There is still hard fighting ahead—costly fighting. But the liberation of the Philippines will mean that Japan has been largely cut off from her conquests in the East Indies.

The landing of our troops on Leyte was the largest amphibious operation thus far conducted in the Pacific.

Preceded by 1944 Second Bill of Rights	State of the Union addresses 1945	Succeeded by 1946 State of the Union Address
