= Commonwealth Club Address =

Speech made by Franklin D. Roosevelt, 1932

The Commonwealth Club Address (23 September 1932) was a speech made by New York Governor and Democratic presidential nominee Franklin Delano Roosevelt at the Commonwealth Club of California in San Francisco on his 1932 presidential campaign. Roosevelt said the era of growth and unrestricted entrepreneurship had ended, and the individualism must give way to collective action. He was not at all specific, but he hinted at liberal reforms of the sort that emerged in The First Hundred Days after his inauguration in March 1933. Scholars rate it among the 100 greatest speeches made by a President in the 20th century.

== Roosevelt's argument ==
Roosevelt was long on history and short on specifics. He sketched a philosophical foundation for the New Deal, and ultimately for a Second Bill of Rights that he was committed to achieving over the course of his administration. Most historians consider it prophetic regarding the actual content of New Deal liberalism.

The great era of rapid economic growth had ended, Roosevelt argued. In the days when growth was all-important, he agreed that it had been necessary to turn political and economic power over to entrepreneurs who were building the nation. But the era of economic growth was over he said; the entrepreneurs are now dangerous:

A mere builder of more industrial plants, a creator of more railroad systems, an organizer of more corporations, is as likely to be a danger as a help. The day of the great promoter or the financial Titan, to whom we granted anything if only he would build, or develop, is over.

Roosevelt said that further growth was unnecessary: "Our task now is not discovery or exploitation of natural resources, or necessarily producing more goods." What America instead needed to do:

Is the soberer, less dramatic business of administering resources and plants already in hand, of seeking to reestablish foreign markets for our surplus production, of meeting the problem of underconsumption, of adjusting production to consumption, of distributing wealth and products more equitably, of adapting existing economic organizations to the service of the people. The day of enlightened administration has come.

Parts of his speech had a gloomy tone: "A glance at the situation today only too clearly indicates that equality of opportunity as we have known it no longer exists." "We are steering a steady course toward economic oligarchy, if we are not there already." However he did hint at reforms that would bring about a better world: "Every man has a right to life; and this means that he has also a right to make a comfortable living."

Biographer Frank Freidel emphasizes that Roosevelt wanted government to "act as a regulator for the common good within the existing economic system." Roosevelt believed his philosophy was in accord with the traditions of Thomas Jefferson and Woodrow Wilson, as modified to deal with a much more complex and mature economic order.

== Reception ==
The response to the speech by the 2000-member luncheon audience and by the national media was tepid. Some thought it too socialistic; others considered it too academic in tone, especially for its long passages on the lessons of American and European history. Roosevelt did not try to rework his material into simpler speeches. He moved on to other topics, and received a rousing reception to the more usual speech he gave that same evening.

The speech was written by Adolf A. Berle and his wife Beatrice, who worked on Roosevelt's campaign office.

== See also ==
- Second Bill of Rights
