= Second Bill of Rights =

Proposed legislation in the US

- Proposed by U.S. President Franklin D. Roosevelt
- Original title: "An Economic Bill of Rights"
- Presented: January 11, 1944
- Signatories: N/A (Executive proposal to Congress)
- Media type: Radio broadcast address & typed transcript
- Purpose: To establish a socio-economic framework guaranteeing economic security, universal healthcare, and employment security post-WWII.

The Second Bill of Rights or Bill of Economic Rights was proposed by United States President Franklin D. Roosevelt during his State of the Union Address on Tuesday, January 11, 1944. In his address, Roosevelt suggested that the nation had come to recognise and should now implement a "second bill of rights". Roosevelt argued that the "political rights" guaranteed by the Constitution and the Bill of Rights had "proved inadequate to assure us equality in the pursuit of happiness". His remedy was to declare an "economic bill of rights" to guarantee these specific rights:

- Employment (right to work) (Note: This "right to work" is not to be confused with the "right-to-work laws" to which this term usually alludes inside the United States.)
- An adequate income for food, shelter, and recreation
- Farmers' rights to a fair income
- Freedom from unfair competition and monopolies
- Decent housing
- Adequate medical care
- Social security
- Education

These rights have come to be known as economic rights; although not to be enshrined within the constitution, the hope of advocating the policy was that it would be "encoded and guaranteed by federal law". Roosevelt stated that having such rights would guarantee American security and that the United States' place in the world depended upon how far the rights had been carried into practice. This safety has been described as a state of physical welfare, as well as "economic security, social security, and moral security" by American legal scholar Cass Sunstein. Roosevelt pursued a legislative agenda to enact his second bill of rights by lending Executive Branch personnel to key Senate committees. This tactic, effectively a blending of powers, produced mixed results and generated a backlash from Congress which resulted in passage of the Legislative Reorganization Act of 1946. This Act provided funding for Congress to establish its own staffing for committees.

== Background ==
In the runup to the Second World War, the United States had suffered through the Great Depression following the Wall Street Crash of 1929. Roosevelt's election at the end of 1932 was based on a commitment to reform the economy and society through a "New Deal" program. The first indication of a commitment to government guarantees of social and economic rights came in an address to the Commonwealth Club on September 23, 1932, during his campaign. The speech was written with Adolf A. Berle, a professor of corporate law at Columbia University. A key passage read:

As I see it, the task of government in its relation to business is to assist the development of an economic declaration of rights, an economic constitutional order. This is the common task of statesman and business man. It is the minimum requirement of a more permanently safe order of things.

Throughout Roosevelt's presidency, he returned to the same theme continually over the course of the New Deal. Also in the Atlantic Charter, an international commitment was made as the Allies thought about how to "win the peace" following victory in the Second World War. The US's commitment to non-interventionism in World War II ending with the 1941 Lend-Lease act, and later Pearl Harbor attacks, resulted in the mobilisation of the war state. The generous terms of the act, in conjunction with the economic growth of the US were key in allowing the US to establish new global order with the help of Allied powers in the aftermath of war. This motivation to establish a new global order provided the infrastructure for the implementation of an international standard of human rights, seen with the Second Bill of Rights and the Universal Declaration of Human Rights. Akira Iriye's proposition that the US desired to transform the post war Pacific after their own image is representative of the wider desire to raise global standards to that of the US, feeding into ideals of American Exceptionalism.

== Roosevelt's speech ==
During Roosevelt's January 11, 1944, message to the Congress on the State of the Union, he said the following:

It is our duty now to begin to lay the plans and determine the strategy for the winning of a lasting peace and the establishment of an American standard of living higher than ever before known. We cannot be content, no matter how high that general standard of living may be, if some fraction of our people—whether it be one-third or one-fifth or one-tenth—is ill-fed, ill-clothed, ill-housed, and insecure.

This Republic had its beginning, and grew to its present strength, under the protection of certain inalienable political rights—among them the right of free speech, free press, free worship, trial by jury, freedom from unreasonable searches and seizures. They were our rights to life and liberty.

As our nation has grown in size and stature, however—as our industrial economy expanded—these political rights proved inadequate to assure us equality in the pursuit of happiness.

We have come to a clear realization of the fact that true individual freedom cannot exist without economic security and independence. "Necessitous men are not free men." People who are hungry and out of a job are the stuff of which dictatorships are made.

In our day these economic truths have become accepted as self-evident. We have accepted, so to speak, a second Bill of Rights under which a new basis of security and prosperity can be established for all—regardless of station, race, or creed.

Among these are:

- The right to a useful and remunerative job in the industries or shops or farms or mines of the nation;
- The right to earn enough to provide adequate food and clothing and recreation;
- The right of every farmer to raise and sell his products at a return which will give him and his family a decent living;
- The right of every businessman, large and small, to trade in an atmosphere of freedom from unfair competition and domination by monopolies at home or abroad;
- The right of every family to a decent home;
- The right to adequate medical care and the opportunity to achieve and enjoy good health;
- The right to adequate protection from the economic fears of old age, sickness, accident, and unemployment;
- The right to a good education.

All of these rights spell security. And after this war is won we must be prepared to move forward, in the implementation of these rights, to new goals of human happiness and well-being.

America's own rightful place in the world depends in large part upon how fully these and similar rights have been carried into practice for all our citizens. For unless there is security here at home there cannot be lasting peace in the world.

== Found footage ==
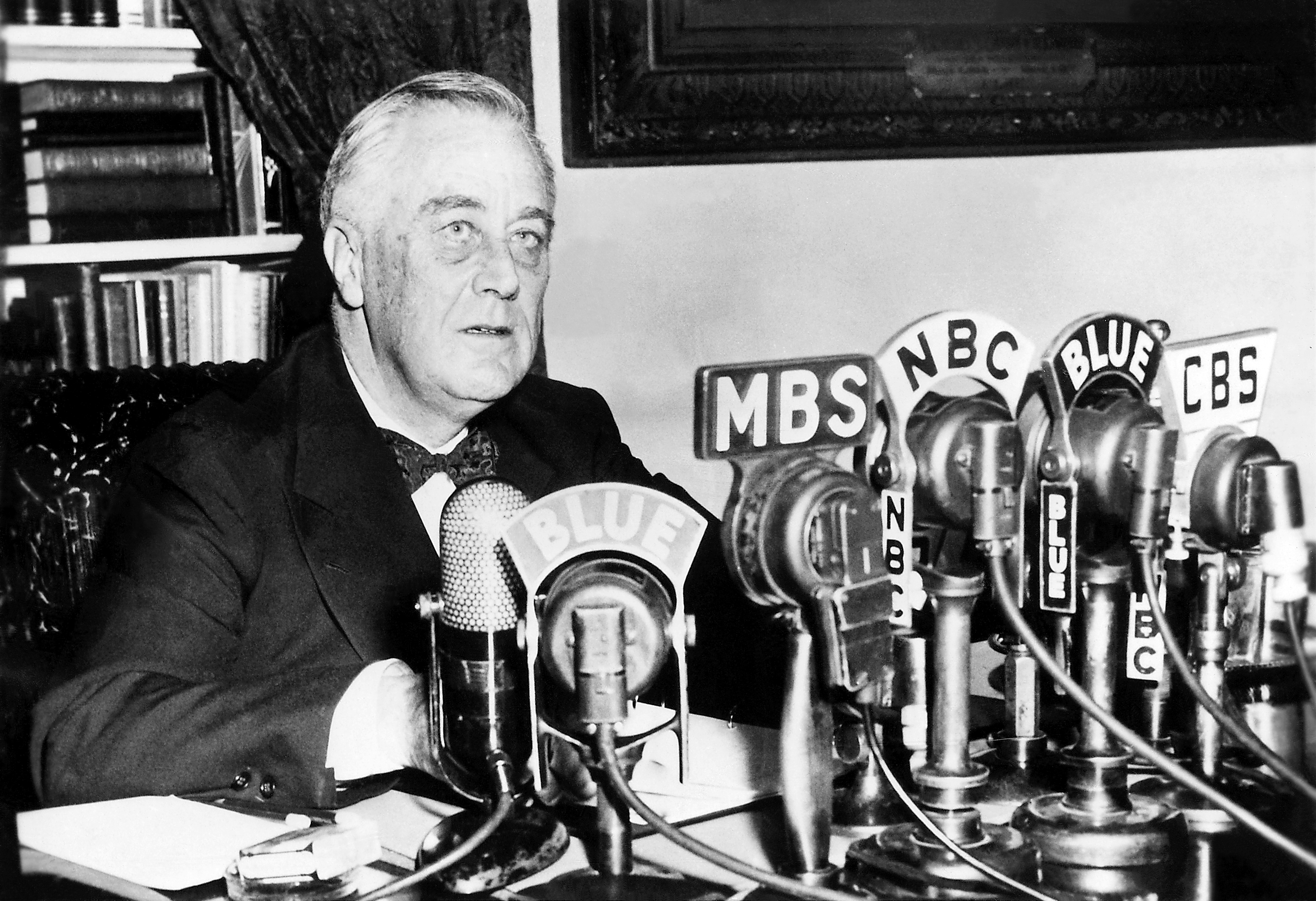
Fireside chat on the State of the Union (January 11, 1944)

Roosevelt presented the January 11, 1944, State of the Union address to the public on radio as a fireside chat from the White House:

Today I sent my Annual Message to the Congress, as required by the Constitution. It has been my custom to deliver these Annual Messages in person, and they have been broadcast to the Nation. I intended to follow this same custom this year. But like a great many other people, I have had the "flu", and although I am practically recovered, my doctor simply would not let me leave the White House to go up to the Capitol. Only a few of the newspapers of the United States can print the Message in full, and I am anxious that the American people be given an opportunity to hear what I have recommended to the Congress for this very fateful year in our history — and the reasons for those recommendations. Here is what I said ...

He asked that newsreel cameras film the last portion of the address, concerning the Second Bill of Rights. This footage was believed lost until it was uncovered in 2008 in South Carolina by Michael Moore while researching the film Capitalism: A Love Story. The footage shows Roosevelt's Second Bill of Rights address in its entirety as well as a shot of the eight rights printed on a sheet of paper.

== Criticism and legacy ==
Some historians have pointed to the contradiction between FDR's Economic Bill of Rights and his decision to keep Japanese Americans in concentration camps contrary to the urgings of key advisors including Attorney General Francis Biddle and Secretary of Interior Harold Ickes. David T. Beito has argued that "Japanese Americans had particular reason to regard the Economic Bill of Rights as a cruel joke. For them, a "decent home" often meant a desert dormitory with Army-issued cots. Any "remunerative job" in the camps paid considerably less than if performed by a white counterpart. The freedom from "unfair competition" meant nothing to people shorn of their businesses because of confinement in the camps."

After Roosevelt's death in 1945, the Fair Deal program of President Harry Truman's administration extended and enlarged Roosevelt's New Deal vision. According to historian Alonzo Hamby, "The Fair Deal was a conscious effort to continue the purpose of the New Deal but not necessarily its methods .... Seeking to go beyond the New Deal while preserving its objectives, the Truman administration advocated a more sweeping and better-ordered reform agenda."

FDR's third-term vice president, Henry Wallace, launched a presidential bid in 1948 with a new party. His Progressive Party platform promoted the Economic Bill of Rights.

In July 1960, at the Democratic National Convention, the party nominated John F. Kennedy for president and Lyndon Johnson for vice president. In the platform, it endorsed the Economic Bill of Rights.

From 1965 to 1969, the Great Society program and the War on Poverty of President Lyndon Johnson's administration built on Roosevelt's ideas, greatly expanding the federal government's role in such areas as education, employment, healthcare, housing, and civil rights.

Civil rights activists A. Philip Randolph and Bayard Rustin in 1966 drafted A “Freedom Budget” for All Americans.

Civil rights leader Martin Luther King Jr., a champion of economic justice long before the historic 1963 March on Washington, lobbied for the economic rights bill in a 1968 Look magazine essay, published after his assassination.

In 2004, legal scholar Cass Sunstein called for a revival of FDR's unfulfilled vision in his book, The Second Bill of Rights: FDR's Unfinished Revolution and Why We Need It More than Ever.

In fall 2009, Michael Moore's Capitalism: A Love Story introduced the Second Bill of Rights to moviegoers and generated national, and even international, press.

In his 2020 presidential primary campaign, progressive Vermont Sen. Bernie Sanders promoted a 21st Century Bill of Rights.

In 2022, Prof. Harvey J. Kaye and Alan Minsky of Progressive Democrats of America (PDA) launched a campaign for a modern, expanded 21st Century Economic Bill of Rights. At its 2022 convention, the Massachusetts Democratic Party endorsed the PDA proposal.

In her 2024 presidential primary campaign, Democratic Party candidate Marianne Williamson featured the 21st Century Economic Bill of Rights in her platform, interviews and speeches.

== See also ==
- Bill of Rights
- Bill of Rights socialism
- Douglas v. California, 372 U.S. 353 (1963)
- Economic democracy
- Four Freedoms, enunciated in Roosevelt's 1941 State of the Union Address
- Full employment
- Goldberg v. Kelly, 397 U.S. 254 (1970)
- Progressive Utilization Theory
- Public education
- Public Service law of the United States
- Right to an adequate standard of living
- Social Security
- Universal health care
- Vernon v Bethell

== Citations ==
Preceded by 1943 State of the Union Address	Second Bill of Rights; 1944	Succeeded by 1945 State of the Union Address
