= Freedom of Worship (painting) =

1943 painting by Norman Rockwell

- or Freedom to Worship
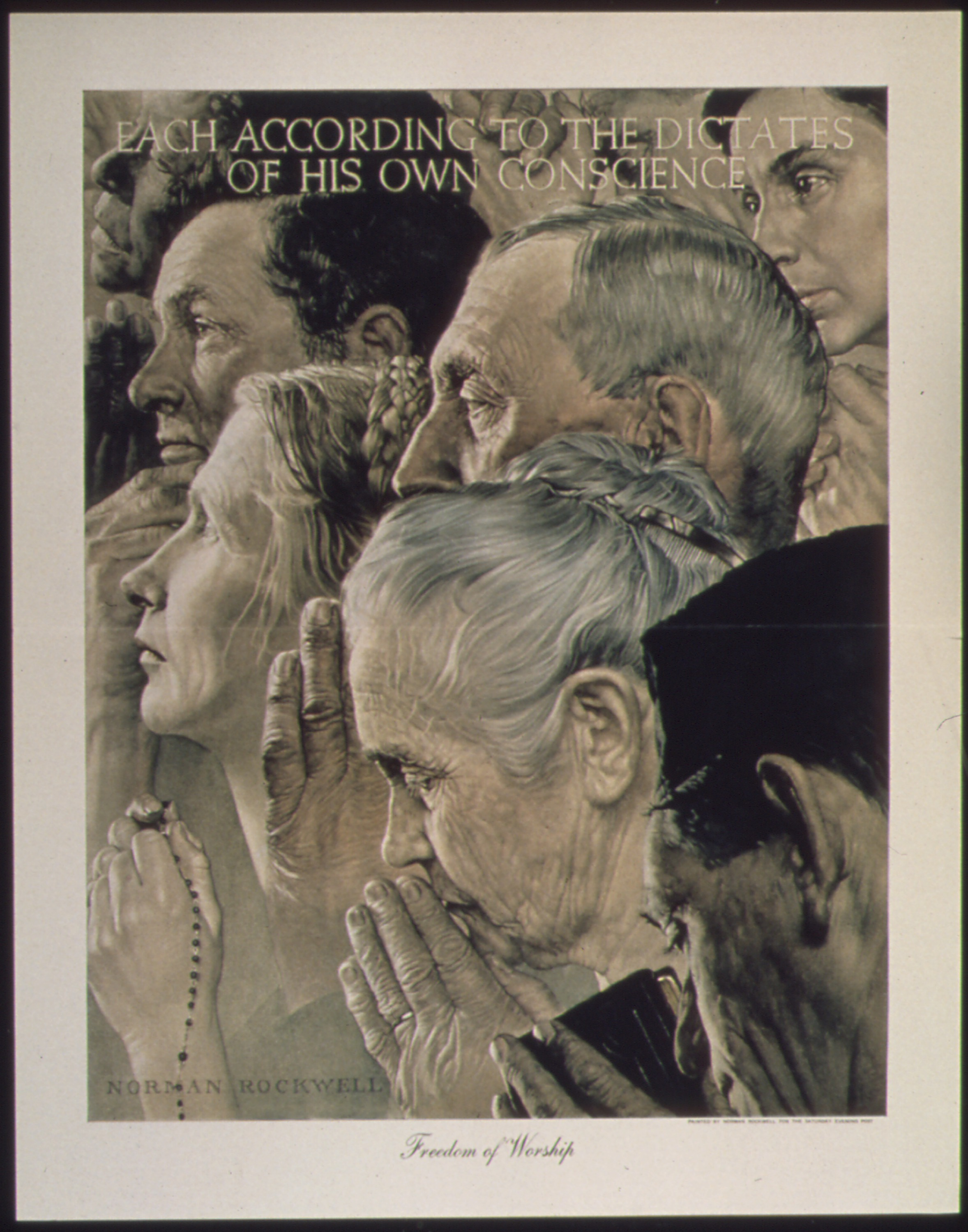
- Artist: Norman Rockwell
- Year: 1943
- Medium: Oil on canvas
- Dimensions: 116.8 cm × 90 cm (46 in × 35.5 in)
- Location: Norman Rockwell Museum, Stockbridge, Massachusetts United States

Freedom of Worship or Freedom to Worship is the second of the Four Freedoms oil paintings produced by the American artist Norman Rockwell. The series was based on the goals known as the Four Freedoms enunciated by Franklin D. Roosevelt, president of the United States from 1933 to 1945, in his State of the Union Address delivered on January 6, 1941. Rockwell considered this painting and Freedom of Speech the most successful of the series. Freedom of Worship was published in the February 27, 1943, issue of The Saturday Evening Post alongside an essay by philosopher Will Durant.

== Background ==
Freedom of Worship is the second of a series of four oil paintings by Norman Rockwell entitled Four Freedoms. The works were inspired by President Franklin D. Roosevelt's State of the Union Address delivered to the 77th United States Congress on January 6, 1941, known as Four Freedoms. Of the Four Freedoms, the only two described in the United States Constitution are freedom of speech and freedom of religion. The Four Freedoms' theme was later incorporated into the Allies' World War II policy statement, the Atlantic Charter, and became part of the charter of the United Nations. The series of paintings ran on four consecutive weeks in The Saturday Evening Post, accompanied by essays from noted writers: Freedom of Speech (February 20), Freedom of Worship (February 27), Freedom from Want (March 6) and Freedom from Fear (March 13). For the essay accompanying Freedom of Worship, Post editor Ben Hibbs chose Durant, who was a best-selling author at the peak of his fame. At the time, Durant was in the midst of working on his ten-volume The Story of Civilization, coauthored with his wife, Ariel Durant. Will Durant also lectured on history and philosophy. Eventually, the series of paintings became widely distributed in poster form and became instrumental in the U.S. Government War Bond Drive.

== Description ==
"The second is freedom of every person to worship God in his own way—everywhere in the world."

— Franklin D. Roosevelt's January 6, 1941 State of the Union address introducing the theme of the Four Freedoms

The painting shows the profiles of eight heads in a modest space. The various figures represent people of different faiths in a moment of prayer. Particularly, three figures on the bottom row (right to left): a man with his head covered carrying a religious book who is Jewish, an older woman who is Protestant, and a younger woman with a well-lit face holding rosary beads who is Catholic. In 1966, Rockwell used Freedom of Worship to show his admiration for John F. Kennedy in a Look story illustration entitled JFK's Bold Legacy. The work depicts Kennedy in profile in a composition similar to Freedom of Worship along with Peace Corps volunteers.

== Production ==
The original draft of Freedom of Worship was set in a barbershop.

The original version of the painting was set in a barbershop with patrons of a variety of religions and races all waiting their turn in the barber's chair. His first workup was a 41-by-33-inch (104 cm × 84 cm) oil on canvas depicting tolerance as "the basis for a democracy's religious diversity". It included a Jew being served by a Protestant barber as a black man and a Roman Catholic priest awaited the barber's services. The problem was painting easily recognizable depictions of different religions and races because there was little agreement on what a person of a certain religion should look like. However, as he attempted to clarify the characters' depictions he found himself resorting to offensive overexaggeration, especially of the non-clerical characters. Making a Jewish man appear stereotypically Semitic, making a white customer preppy and relegating the black man to agrarian workman attire bogged down the work without speaking on behalf of the government as it should. Rockwell's intended theme was religious tolerance, but he felt the original composition did not successfully make this point.

In June 1942, Post editor Ben Hibbs became supportive of Rockwell's Four Freedoms sketches, and gave Rockwell two months to complete the works. By October, the Post was worried about Rockwell's progress on the Four Freedoms and sent their art editor to Arlington to evaluate. At that time Rockwell was working on Freedom of Worship, his second painting in the series. Rockwell spent two months (October and most of November 1942) on this work, that was inspired by the phrase "Each according to the dictates of his own conscience." His Arlington, Vermont, neighbors served as his models: Three months pregnant with her hair upbraided, Rose Hoyt posed as a Catholic with a rosary, even though she was actually Protestant of the Episcopal Church. Other models were a Mrs. Harrington, Rockwell's carpenter Walter Squires, Squire's wife Clara Squires (at the right-hand edge), Winfield Secoy, and Jim Martin (center). His final version relied on other visual clues, including a rosary and a religious book. The work had dark-skinned black worshipers juxtaposed on the edges. This placement did not rock the boat with The Post who had not yet featured blacks prominently on its pages. Rockwell said he made these ethnics palatable by "'furtively' painting the face of the black woman at the top; the man at the bottom, with his fez, was too obviously foreign to offend." The image is commonly enhanced and often darkened in reproduction because it uses a color combination of soft greys, beiges and browns. The paint was applied thinly, which allows the weave of the canvas to contribute to the image.

Rockwell has stated that he feels hands are second only to heads in importance to the expression of a story. He stated with regards to Freedom of Worship, "I depended on the hands alone to convey about half of the message I wish to put over." Rockwell's extensive effort on this work was due to his belief that religion "is an extremely delicate subject. It is so easy to hurt so many people's feelings."

== Critical review ==
Post editor Ben Hibbs said of Speech and Worship, "To me they are great human documents in the form of paint and canvas. A great picture, I think is one which moves and inspires millions of people. The Four Freedoms did – and do." Walt Disney wrote, "I thought [Rockwell's] Four Freedoms were great. I especially loved the Freedom of Worship and the composition and symbolism expressed in it." Rockwell believed that Freedom of Worship and Freedom of Speech were his better results in the series. Laura Claridge has written that the inspirational phrase "Each according to the dictates of his own conscience" is a "platitude that suggests the plurality of Rockwell's own thoughts on religion: its likely source was a phrase included in the Thirteen Articles of Faith by Joseph Smith." In fact, Rockwell repeatedly asked colleagues about possible sources of the quote and was not told about Smith's writing until after the series was published. The expression "according to the dictates of his conscience" (or a similar variation) was used in many United States state constitutions in the eighteenth century.

Critical review of the painting shows that some practitioners of particular faiths are disappointed by the perceived lack of advertising for their faith in Freedom of Religion. Claridge feels that

the tight amalgam of faces ... and even the crepey skin on elderly hands, which have become the objects of worship, push the theme over the edge from idealistic tolerance into gooey sentiment, where human differences seem caught up in a magical moment of dispensation from the Light. The restraint demanded by art that deals with heightened emotion is lacking.

Claridge stated that the earlier version was "clean, impressively sparse, in counterpoise to a dense narrative content. Beautifully painted even at the preliminary oil sketch stage." Murray and McCabe note that the work is a divergence from the "storytelling style" that Rockwell is known for.

Deborah Solomon considers the painting the least satisfactory of the series as she feels it is congested and somewhat "didactic". Maureen Hart Hennessey, chief curator of the Norman Rockwell Museum, and curator Anne Knutson consider the scale of the picture that only shows heads and hands in prayer as disruptive. Bruce Cole of The Wall Street Journal noted that Rockwell's "depiction of spectral close-up faces and hands raised in prayer is bland, without any real message about religious freedom—again, no wallop. This is because faith, like the absence of fear and the absence of want, is essentially private, something personal, intangible and unpicturable."

== Other ==
In 2018 Sharon Brous, among others, was on the cover of Time; the cover was based on this painting.

== General and cited references ==
- Claridge, Laura (2001). "21: The Big Ideas". Norman Rockwell: A Life. Random House. pp. 303–314. ISBN 0-375-50453-2.
- Hennessey, Maureen Hart; Anne Knutson (1999). "The Four Freedoms". Norman Rockwell: Pictures for the American People. Harry N. Abrams, Inc. with High Museum of Art and Norman Rockwell Museum. pp. 94–102. ISBN 0-8109-6392-2.
- Meyer, Susan E. (1981). Norman Rockwell's People. Harry N. Abrams. pp. 128–33. ISBN 0-8109-1777-7.
- Murray, Stuart; James McCabe (1993). Norman Rockwell's Four Freedoms. Gramercy Books. ISBN 0-517-20213-1.
- Rockwell, Norman (1983). "The Importance of Detail". How I Make a Picture. Watson-Guptill Publications. p. 64. ISBN 0-8230-2384-2.
- Solomon, Deborah (2013). "Fifteen: The Four Freedoms (May 1942 to May 1943)". American Mirror: The Life and Art of Norman Rockwell. Farrar, Straus and Giroux. pp. 201–220. ISBN 978-0-374-11309-4.
