= Freedom from fear =

Fundamental human right

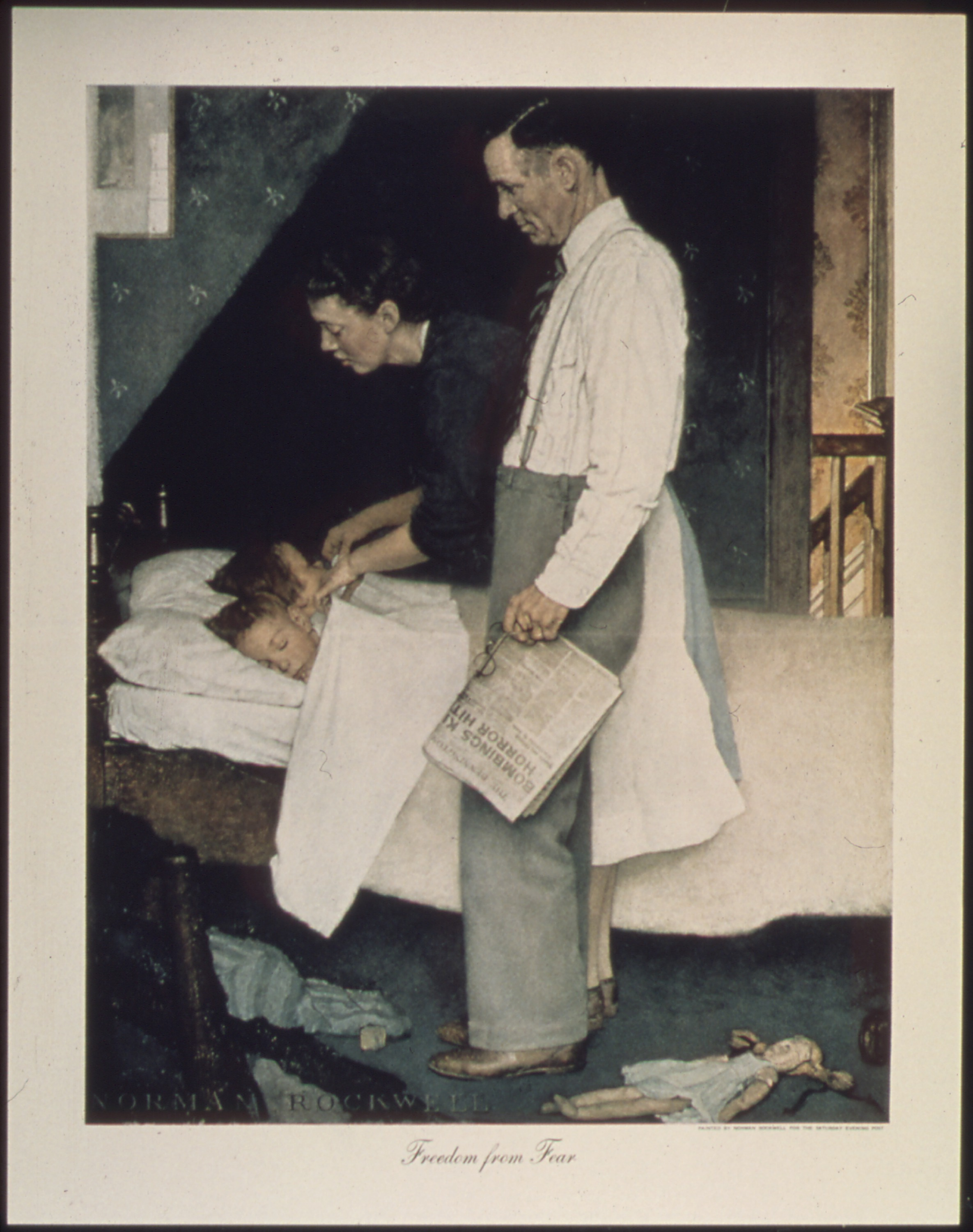
Freedom from Fear from painter Norman Rockwell, c. 1943

Freedom from fear is listed as a fundamental human right according to The Universal Declaration of Human Rights, adopted in 1948. On January 6, 1941, United States President Franklin D. Roosevelt called it one of the "Four Freedoms" at his State of the Union, which was afterwards therefore referred to as the "Four Freedoms speech". These ideas of fear stem back to what people see as a threat to themselves which can range from terrorism to political tension. By acknowledging the current threats to a way of life there will be constant shifts to determine what warrants action. This can be seen through both traditional security and through the evolution of human security. By understanding fear in this context, there certainly would be opportunity to suppress and exacerbate the impacts on populations.

== Origins ==
In his speech, President Franklin D. Roosevelt formulated freedom from fear as follows:

"The fourth is freedom from fear, which, translated into world terms, means a world-wide reduction of armaments to such a point and in such a thorough fashion that no nation will be in a position to commit an act of physical aggression against any neighbor—anywhere in the world."

The four freedoms of Roosevelt formed an important pillar of the Universal Declaration of Human Rights that were adopted on December 10, 1948, by the United Nations General Assembly. The freedom from fear is mentioned in the preamble of the Declaration. In the United States, Roosevelt's successor, Harry Truman, invoked the "freedom from fear" for all Americans to promote civil rights protections and decry discriminatory violence. The idea of freedom from fear would be put into practice, as seen in case law, and is motivated by societal and global changes.

== Inspiration ==
In 1943, painter Norman Rockwell created Freedom from Fear, in his series of four paintings called Four Freedoms.

It is an important concept for Burmese Aung San Suu Kyi, who published a book on it in 1991 with the title Freedom from Fear. In 1999 historian David M. Kennedy published a book called Freedom from Fear: The American People in Depression and War, 1929–1945. It asks the question, "Does fear alter life satisfaction?"

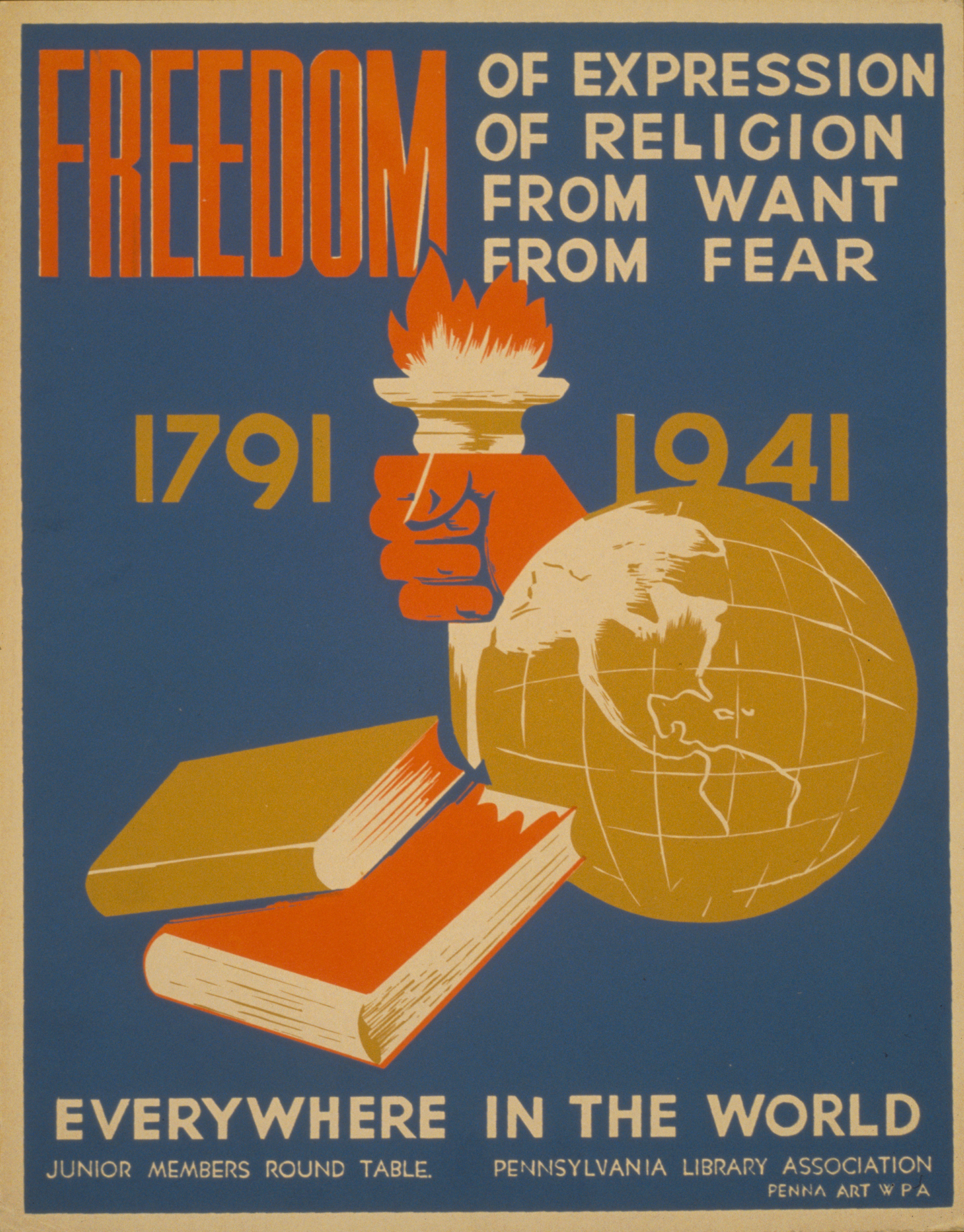
Pennsylvania Library Association promotion of fundamental freedoms in the United States

== United States Perspective ==
When looking at Freedom from Fear from the perspective of the United States, there has been constant criticism and evolution since its origins. The U.S. has a long history of using Freedom from Fear in a multitude of political and social lenses. This was especially prevalent during the Great Depression and World War II. The strategies used by the American government promoted the fundamental freedoms for the citizens to use against any anti groups. Existing case law in Europe, Australia, Canada, South Africa, and the USA indicates that the policies adopted by states concerning human rights have led to a diminished perception of freedom from fear.

== International Perspective ==
The principle of Freedom from Fear can be perceived differently across cultures which shapes how and if implemented to domestic and international policy. A lack of Freedom from Fear doctrine application in a states interests It has also been forgot about within human rights treaties with focuses on the relationship between states and how that impacts each respective populations. Bangladesh has seen state repression, intra group armed conflict, ethnic tension, violent crime, and sexual violence. This can be seen in Laos with economic and social unrest related to a lack of freedom from fear. As developments have continued, there are successes to achieving infrastructure and political stability. Democratic states such as Canada have continued to grow on past experiences of human security. This affects how citizens achieve personal security through a standard of life satisfaction.

== A New Age ==
The new standard of Freedom from Fear has shaped how Human Security and Freedom from Fear collaborate to achieve a secure state. A liberalism approach sees how freedom, markets, and morals can establish each states own security within the realm of both domestic and international security. The work of these efforts have been seen to promote change in states with fundamental human rights issues. Now programs are in place to foster collaboration to promote Roosevelt's initial intent for the entire world to prosper and maintain stability.

== See also ==
- Freedom of speech
- Four Freedoms Award
- Four Freedoms Monument
- Human security
- Right to an adequate standard of living
- Freedom from Fear, book by Aung San Suu Kyi
