= Freedom from Want =

1943 painting by Norman Rockwell

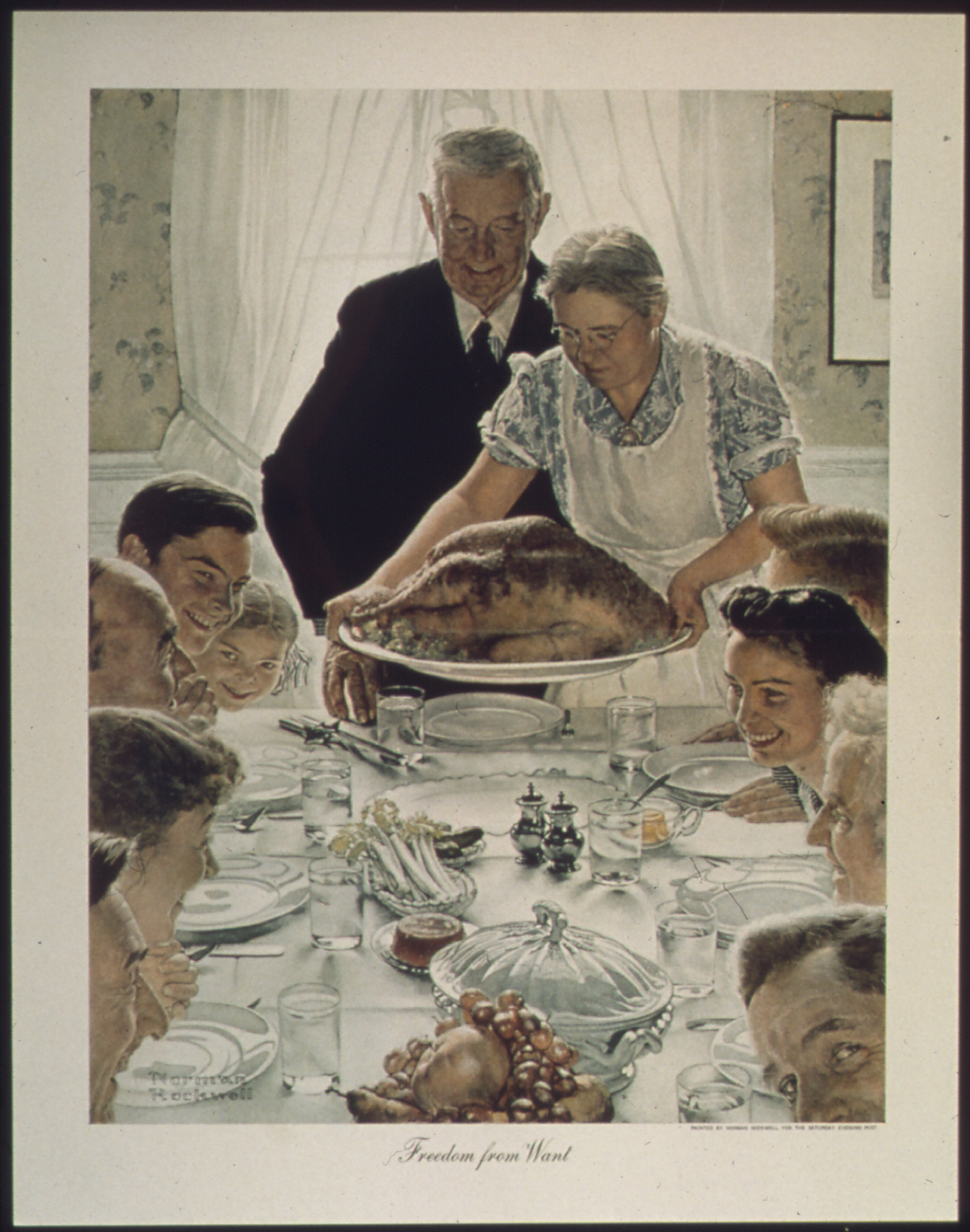
- Artist: Norman Rockwell
- Year: 1943
- Medium: Oil on canvas
- Dimensions: 116.2 cm × 90 cm (45.75 in × 35.5 in)
- Location: Norman Rockwell Museum, Stockbridge, Massachusetts, United States

Freedom from Want, also known as The Thanksgiving Picture or I'll Be Home for Christmas, is the third of the Four Freedoms, a series of four oil paintings by American artist Norman Rockwell. The paintings were inspired by the Four Freedoms, a set of four goals articulated by Franklin D. Roosevelt, the president of the United States, in his 1941 State of the Union address.

Freedom from Want was painted in November 1942 and published in the March 6, 1943, issue of The Saturday Evening Post. All of the people in the picture were friends and family of Rockwell in Arlington, Vermont, who were photographed individually and painted into the scene. The work depicts a group of people gathered around a dinner table for a holiday meal. Having been partially created on Thanksgiving to depict the celebration, it has become an iconic representation for Americans of Thanksgiving and family holiday gatherings in general. The Post published Freedom from Want with a corresponding essay by Carlos Bulosan as part of the Four Freedoms series. Despite many who endured sociopolitical hardships abroad, Bulosan's essay spoke on behalf of those enduring the socioeconomic hardships domestically, and it thrust him into prominence.

The painting has had a wide array of adaptations, parodies, and other uses, such as for the cover for the 1946 book Norman Rockwell, Illustrator. Although the image was popular at the time in the United States and remains so, it caused resentment in Europe where the masses were enduring wartime hardship. Artistically, the work is highly regarded as an example of mastery of the challenges of white-on-white painting and as one of Rockwell's most famous works.

== Background ==
The third is freedom from want—which, translated into world terms, means economic understandings which will secure to every nation a healthy peacetime life for its inhabitants—everywhere in the world.

— Roosevelt's 1941 State of the Union address introducing the theme of the Four Freedoms

Freedom from Want is the third in a series of four oil paintings entitled Four Freedoms by Norman Rockwell. They were inspired by Franklin D. Roosevelt's State of the Union Address, known as the Four Freedoms speech, delivered to the 77th United States Congress on January 6, 1941. In the early 1940s, Roosevelt's Four Freedoms themes were still vague and abstract to many, but the government used them to help boost patriotism. The Four Freedoms' theme was eventually incorporated into the Atlantic Charter, and it became part of the charter of the United Nations. The series of paintings ran in The Saturday Evening Post accompanied by essays from noted writers on four consecutive weeks: Freedom of Speech (February 20), Freedom of Worship (February 27), Freedom from Want (March 6), and Freedom from Fear (March 13). Eventually, the series was widely distributed in poster form and became instrumental in the U.S. Government War Bond Drive.

== Description ==
The illustration is an oil painting on canvas, measuring 45.75 by 35.5 inches (116.2 cm × 90.2 cm). The Norman Rockwell Museum describes it as a story illustration for The Saturday Evening Post, complementary to the theme, but the image is also an autonomous visual expression.

The painting shows an aproned matriarch presenting a roasted turkey to a family of several generations, in Rockwell's idealistic presentation of family values. The patriarch looks on with fondness and approval from the head of the table, which is the central element of the painting. Its creased tablecloth shows that this is a special occasion for "sharing what we have with those we love", according to Lennie Bennett. The table has a bowl of fruit, celery, pickles, and what appears to be cranberry sauce. There is a covered silver serving dish that would traditionally hold potatoes, according to Richard Halpern, but Bennett describes this as a covered casserole dish. The servings are less prominent than the presentation of white linen, white plates and water-filled glasses. The people in the painting are not yet eating, and the painting contrasts the empty plates and vacant space in their midst with images of overabundance.

== Production ==
Our cook cooked it, I painted it and we ate it. That was one of the few times I've ever eaten the model.

— Rockwell

In mid-June Rockwell sketched in charcoal the Four Freedoms and sought commission from the Office of War Information (OWI). He was rebuffed by an official who said, "The last war, you illustrators did the posters. This war, we're going to use fine arts men, real artists." However, Saturday Evening Post editor Ben Hibbs recognized the potential of the set and encouraged Rockwell to produce them right away. By early fall, the authors for the Four Freedoms had submitted their essays. Rockwell was concerned that Freedom from Want did not match Bulosan's text. In mid-November, Hibbs wrote Rockwell pleading that he not scrap his third work to start over. Hibbs alleviated Rockwell's thematic concern; he explained that the illustrations only needed to address the same topic rather than be in unison. Hibbs pressured Rockwell into completing his work by warning him that the magazine was on the verge of being compelled by the government to place restrictions on four-color printing, so Rockwell had better get the work published before relegation to halftone printing.

In 1942, Rockwell decided to use neighbors as models for the series. In Freedom from Want, he used his living room for the setting and relied on neighbors for advice, critical commentary, and their service as his models. For Freedom from Want, Rockwell photographed his cook as she presented the turkey on Thanksgiving Day 1942. He said that he painted the turkey on that day and that, unlike Freedom of Speech and Freedom of Worship, this painting was not difficult to execute. Rockwell's wife Mary is in this painting, and the family cook, Mrs. Thaddeus Wheaton, is placing in front of Mr. Wheaton (who is the man standing at the end of the table) the turkey that the Rockwell family ate that day. The nine adults and two children depicted were photographed in Rockwell's studio and painted into the scene later. The models are (clockwise from Mr. and Mrs. Wheaton) Lester Brush, Florence Lindsey, Rockwell's mother Nancy, Jim Martin, Dan Walsh, Mary Rockwell, Charles Lindsey, and the Hoisington children, Bill and Shirley. Jim Martin appears in all four paintings in the series. Shirley Hoisington, the girl at the end of the table, was six at the time.

After the Four Freedoms series ran in The Saturday Evening Post, the magazine made sets of reproductions available to the public and received 25,000 orders. Additionally the OWI, which six months earlier had declined to employ Rockwell to promote the Four Freedoms, requested 2.5 million sets of posters featuring the Four Freedoms for its war-bond drive in early 1943.

Rockwell bequeathed this painting to a custodianship that became the Norman Rockwell Museum in Stockbridge, Massachusetts, and it is now part of the museum's permanent collection. Rockwell lived in Stockbridge from 1953 until his death in 1978.

== Reactions ==
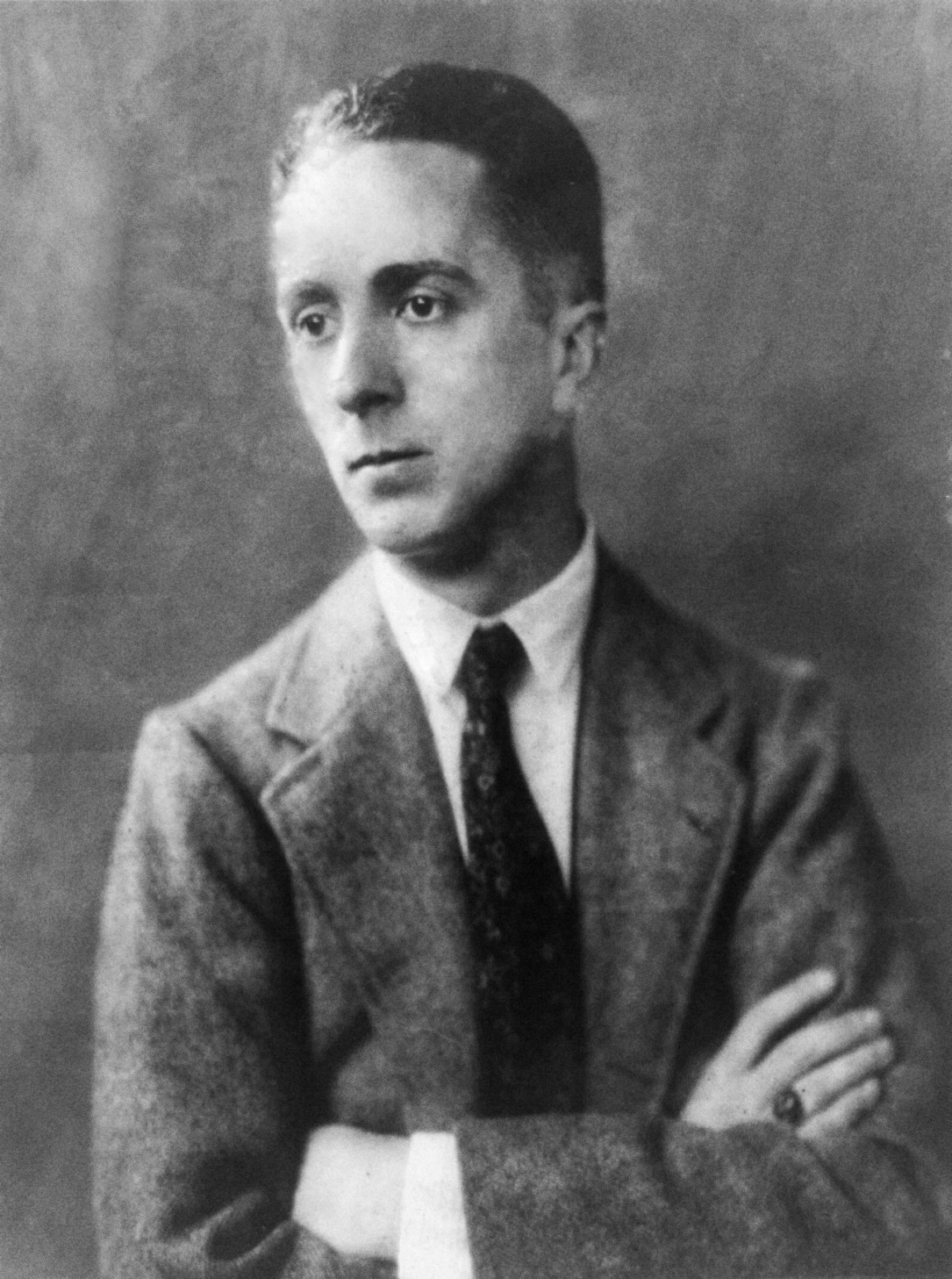
Norman Rockwell early in his career

Freedom from Want is considered one of Rockwell's finest works. Of the four paintings in the Four Freedoms, it is the one most often seen in art books with critical review and commentary. Although all were intended to promote patriotism in a time of war, Freedom from Want became a symbol of "family togetherness, peace, and plenty", according to Linda Rosenkrantz, who compares it to "a 'Hallmark' Christmas". Embodying nostalgia for an enduring American theme of holiday celebration, the painting is not exclusively associated with Thanksgiving, and is sometimes known as I'll Be Home for Christmas. The abundance and unity it shows were the idyllic hope of a post-war world, and the image has been reproduced in various formats.

According to author Amy Dempsey, during the Cold War, Rockwell's images affirmed traditional American values, depicting Americans as prosperous and free. Rockwell's work came to be categorized within art movements and styles such as Regionalism and American scene painting. Rockwell's work sometimes displays an idealized vision of America's rural and agricultural past. Rockwell summed up his own idealism: "I paint life as I would like it to be."

Despite Rockwell's general optimism, he had misgivings about having depicted such a large turkey when much of Europe was "starving, overrun [and] displaced" as World War II raged. Rockwell noted that this painting was not popular in Europe: "The Europeans sort of resented it because it wasn't freedom from want, it was overabundance, the table was so loaded down with food." Outside the United States, this overabundance was the common perception. However, Richard Halpern says the painting not only displays overabundance of food, but also of "family, conviviality, and security", and opines that "overabundance rather than mere sufficiency is the true answer to want." He parallels the emotional nourishment provided by the image to that of the food nourishment that it depicts, remarking that the picture is noticeably inviting. However, by depicting the table with nothing but empty plates and white dishes on white linen, Rockwell may have been invoking the Puritan origins of the Thanksgiving holiday.

To art critic Robert Hughes, the painting represents the theme of family continuity, virtue, homeliness, and abundance without extravagance in a Puritan tone, as confirmed by the modest beverage choice of water. Historian Lizabeth Cohen says that by depicting this freedom as a celebration in the private family home rather than a worker with a job or a government protecting the hungry and homeless, Rockwell suggests that ensuring this freedom was not as much a government responsibility as something born from participation in the mass consumer economy.

One of the notable and artistically challenging elements of the image is Rockwell's use of white-on-white: white plates sitting on a white tablecloth. Art critic Deborah Solomon describes this as "one of the most ambitious plays of white-against-white since Whistler's Symphony in White, No. 1". Solomon further describes the work as "a new level of descriptive realism. Yet, the painting doesn't feel congested or fussy; it is open and airy in the center. Extensive passages of white paint nicely frame the individual faces."

Jim Martin, positioned in the lower right, gives a coy and perhaps mischievous glance back at the viewer. He is a microcosm of the entire scene in which no one appears to be giving thanks in a traditional manner of a Thanksgiving dinner. Solomon finds it a departure from previous depictions of Thanksgiving in that the participants do not lower their heads or raise their hands in the traditional poses of prayer. She sees it as an example of treating American traditions in both sanctified and casual ways. Theologian David Brown sees gratitude as implicit in the painting, while Kenneth Bendiner writes that Rockwell was mindful of the Last Supper and that the painting's perspective echoes its rendition by Tintoretto.

== Essay ==
Freedom from Want was published with an essay by Carlos Bulosan as part of the Four Freedoms series. Bulosan's essay spoke on behalf of those enduring domestic socioeconomic hardships rather than sociopolitical hardships abroad, and it thrust him into prominence. As he neared his thirtieth birthday, the Philippine immigrant and labor organizer Bulosan was experiencing a life that was not consistent with the theme Rockwell depicted in his version of Freedom from Want. Unknown as a writer, he was subsisting as a migrant laborer working intermittent jobs. Post editors tracked down the impoverished immigrant to request an essay contribution. Bulosan rose to prominence during World War II when the Commonwealth of the Philippines, a United States territory, was occupied by Japan. To many Americans, Bulosan's essay marked his introduction, and his name was thereafter well recognized. The essay was lost by The Post, and Bulosan, who had no carbon copy, had to track down the only draft of the essay at a bar in Tacoma.

Freedom from Want had previously been less entwined in the standard liberalism philosophies of the western world than the other three freedoms (speech, fear, and religion); this freedom added economic liberty as a societal aspiration. In his essay, Bulosan treats negative liberties as positive liberties by suggesting that Americans be "given equal opportunity to serve themselves and each other according to their needs and abilities", an echo of Karl Marx's "from each according to his abilities, to each according to his needs". In the final paragraph of the essay, the phrase "The America we hope to see is not merely a physical but also a spiritual and intellectual world" describes an egalitarian America. In a voice likened to Steinbeck's in works such as The Grapes of Wrath, Bulosan's essay spoke up for those who struggled to survive in the capitalist democracy and was regarded as "haunting and sharp" against the backdrop of Rockwell's feast of plenty. It proposed that while citizens had obligations to the state, the state had an obligation to provide a basic level of subsistence. Unlike Roosevelt, Bulosan presented the case that the New Deal had not already granted freedom from want as it did not guarantee Americans the essentials of life.

== References in popular culture ==
=== Visual arts ===
Tony Bennett's 2008 Christmas album entitled A Swingin' Christmas (Featuring The Count Basie Big Band) parodies Freedom from Want.

- The painting was used as the 1946 book cover for Norman Rockwell, Illustrator, written during the prime of Rockwell's career when he was regarded as America's most popular illustrator. This image's iconic status has led to parody and satire.
- MAD magazine #39 (May 1958) presented a magazine satire called "The Saturday Evening Pest", which featured a parody of Freedom from Want on the cover. In the parody, the family's circumstances are far from ideal.
- New York painter Frank Moore re-created Rockwell's all-white Americans with an ethnically diverse family, as Freedom to Share (1994), in which the turkey platter brims over with health care supplies.
- Among the better known reproductions is Mickey and Minnie Mouse entertaining their cartoon family with a festive turkey. Several political cartoons have invoked this image.
- The painting was reenacted in the May 16, 2012, season 3 "Tableau Vivant" episode of the comedy television series Modern Family.
- Another imitation of the work is the cover art to Tony Bennett's 2008 Christmas album A Swingin' Christmas (Featuring The Count Basie Big Band). The parody includes all 13 members of Count Basie's band.
- The cover to DC Comics JSA Issue 54 was also an homage to this image with various superheroes such as Superman, Power Girl, and Wonder Woman.
- A promotional poster for the 2018 film Deadpool 2 replaced the painting's characters with characters from the film.

=== Film ===
- A snapshot at the end of the 2002 Disney animated film Lilo & Stitch shows the film's characters seated at a Thanksgiving table, echoing the painting.
- In the 2009 film The Blind Side, when the Tuohy family gathers at the Thanksgiving table, the scene is transformed into a replica of the famous painting.
