= Four Freedoms (Rockwell) =

1943 painting series by Norman Rockwell

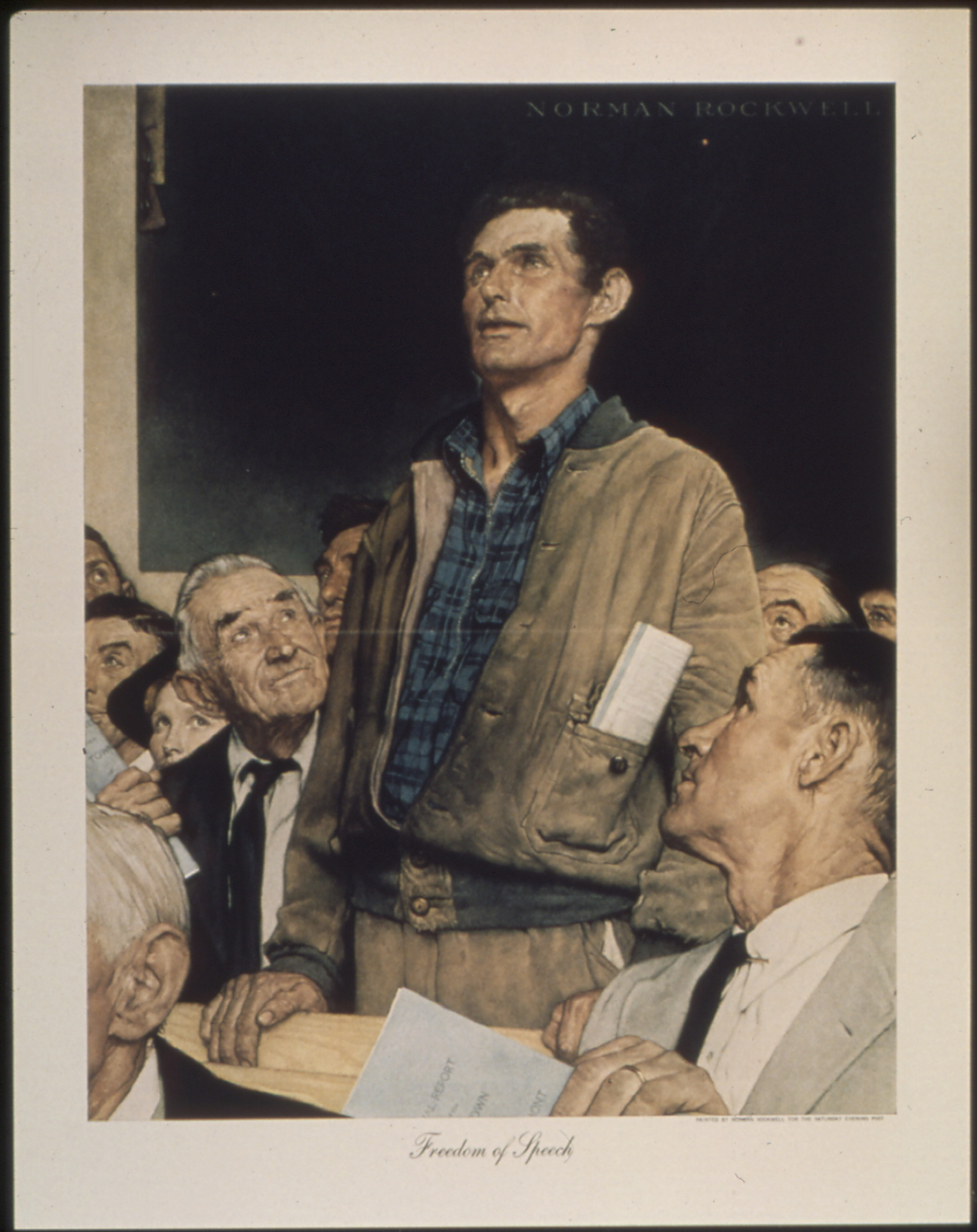
Freedom of Speech

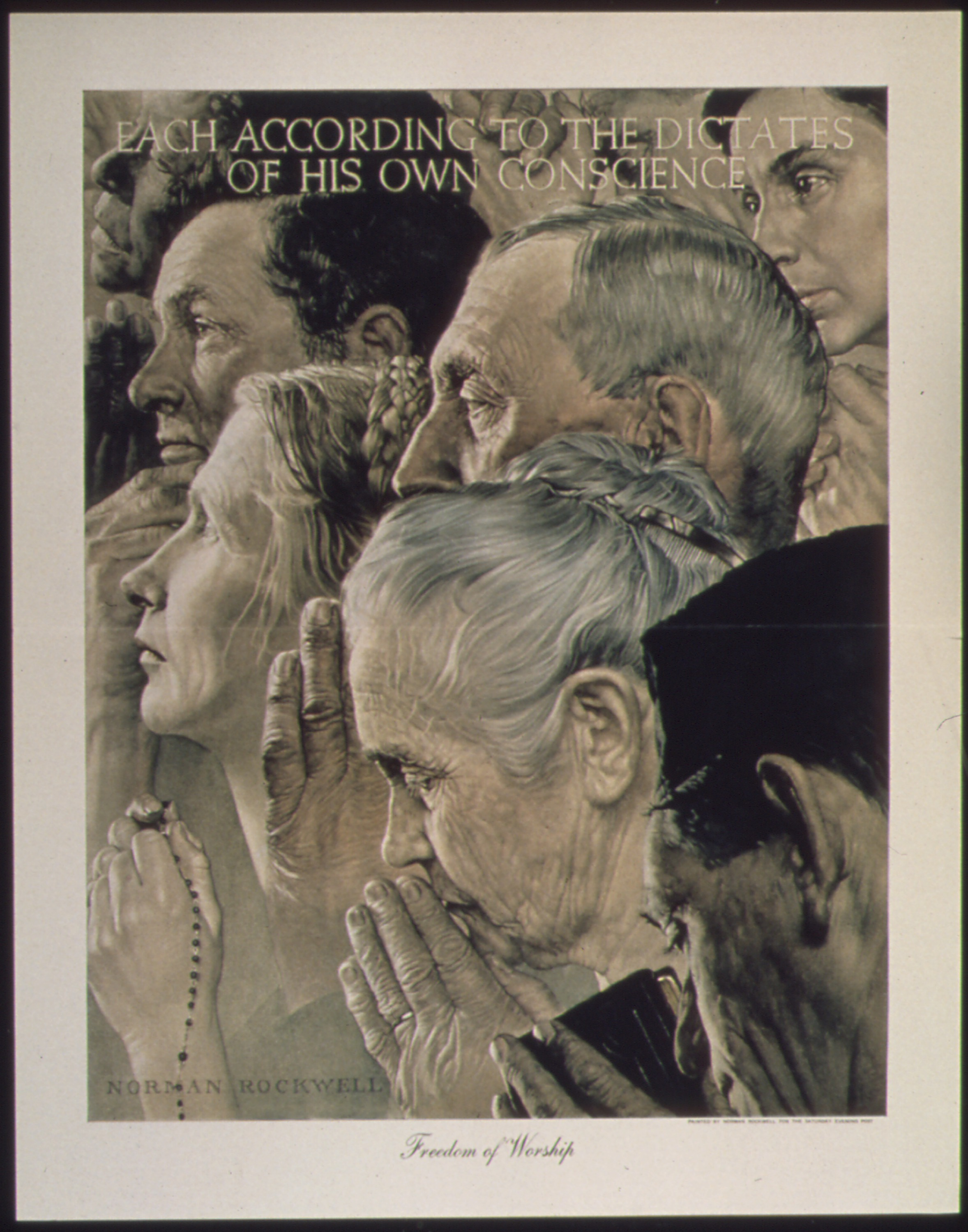
Freedom of Worship

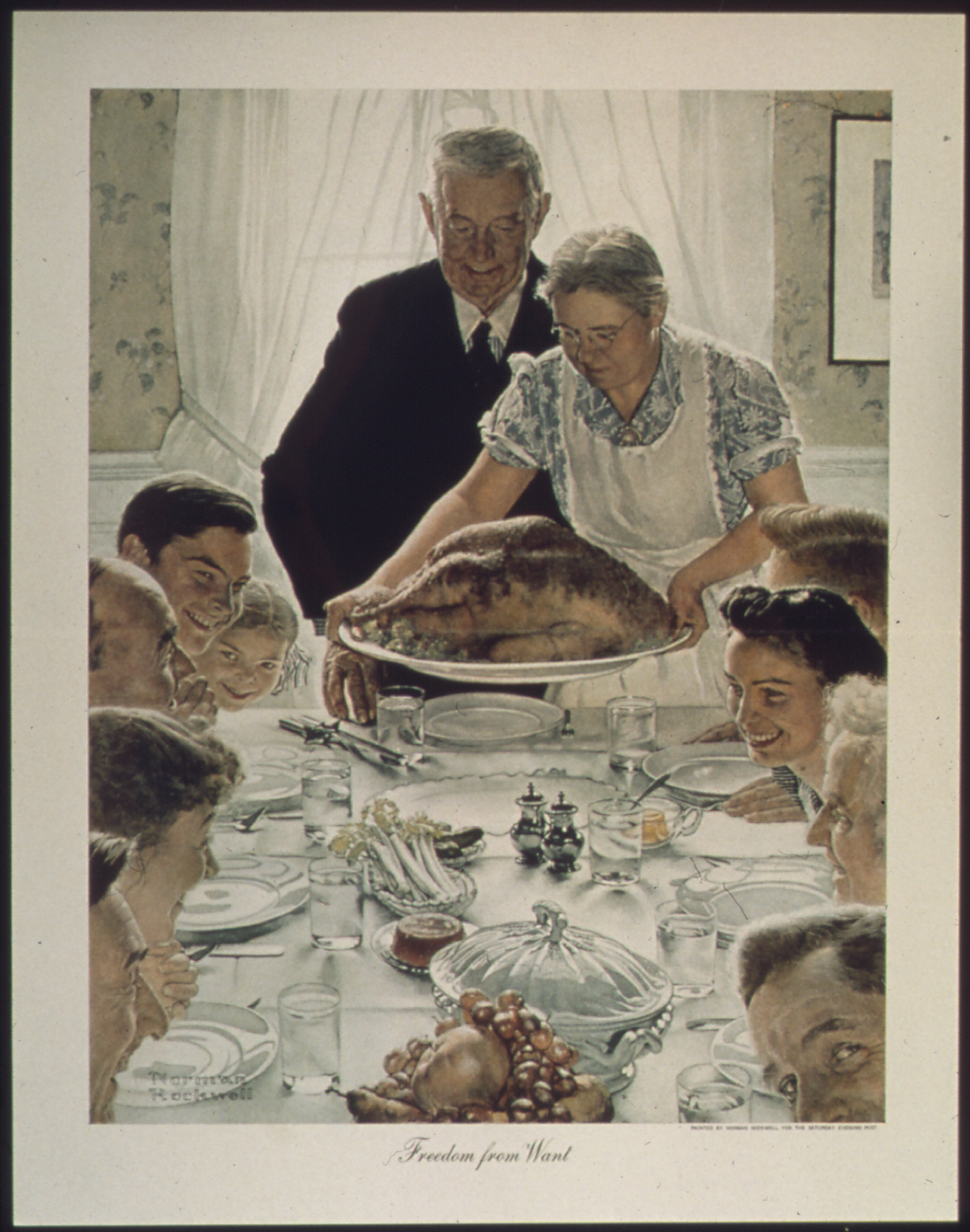
Freedom from Want

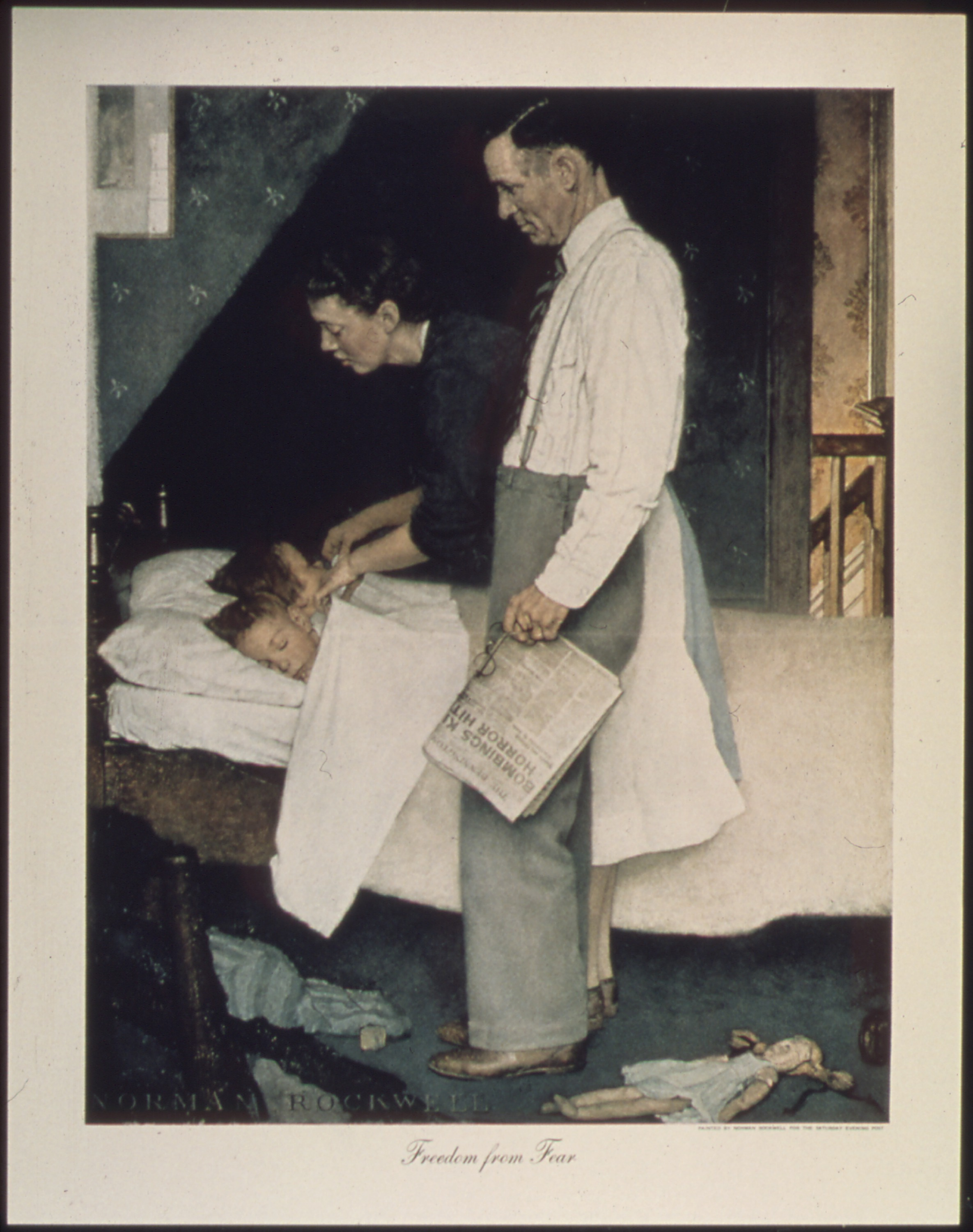
Freedom from Fear
Four-canvas series displayed by date of publication
- Artist: Norman Rockwell
- Year: 1943; 83 years ago
- Medium: Oil on canvas
- Dimensions: Each ≅ 45.75 by 35.5 inches (116.2 by 90.2 cm)
- Location: Norman Rockwell Museum, Stockbridge, Massachusetts, United States

The Four Freedoms is a series of four oil paintings made in 1943 by the American artist Norman Rockwell. The paintings—Freedom of Speech, Freedom of Worship, Freedom from Want, and Freedom from Fear—are each approximately 45.75 by 35.5 inches (116.2 by 90.2 cm), and are now in the Norman Rockwell Museum in Stockbridge, Massachusetts. The four freedoms refer to President Franklin D. Roosevelt's January 1941 Four Freedoms State of the Union address, in which he identified essential human rights that should be universally protected. The theme was incorporated into the Atlantic Charter, and became part of the Charter of the United Nations. The paintings were reproduced in The Saturday Evening Post over four consecutive weeks in 1943, alongside essays by prominent thinkers of the day. They became the highlight of a touring exhibition sponsored by The Post and the U.S. Department of the Treasury. The exhibition and accompanying sales drives of war bonds raised over $132 million.

This series has been the cornerstone of retrospective art exhibits presenting the career of Rockwell, who was the most widely known and popular commercial artist of the mid-20th century, but did not achieve critical acclaim. These are among his best-known works, and by some accounts became his most widely distributed paintings. At one time they were commonly displayed in post offices, schools, clubs, railroad stations, and a variety of public and semi-public buildings.

A critical review of these images, like most of Rockwell's work, has not been entirely positive. Rockwell's idyllic and nostalgic approach to regionalism made him a popular illustrator but a lightly regarded fine artist during his lifetime, a view still prevalent today. However, he has created an enduring niche in the social fabric with Freedom from Want, emblematic of what is now known as the "Norman Rockwell Thanksgiving".

== Franklin Delano Roosevelt's speech ==
In the future days, which we seek to make secure, we look forward to a world founded upon four essential human freedoms.
The first is freedom of speech and expression—everywhere in the world.
The second is freedom of every person to worship God in his own way—everywhere in the world.
The third is freedom from want—which, translated into world terms, means economic understandings which will secure to every nation a healthy peacetime life for its inhabitants—everywhere in the world.
The fourth is freedom from fear—which, translated into world terms, means a world-wide reduction of armaments to such a point and in such a thorough fashion that no nation will be in a position to commit an act of physical aggression against any neighbor—anywhere in the world.
That is no vision of a distant millennium. It is a definite basis for a kind of world attainable in our own time and generation. That kind of world is the very antithesis of the so-called new order of tyranny which the dictators seek to create with the crash of a bomb.

— Franklin Delano Roosevelt

State of the Union (Four Freedoms) (January 6, 1941)
Franklin Delano Roosevelt's January 6, 1941 State of the Union address introducing the theme of the Four Freedoms (starting at 32:02)

Throughout his political career, Roosevelt championed the cause of human rights. In his annual State of the Union address to Congress on January 6, 1941, which was delivered at a time when Nazi Germany occupied much of Western Europe, he asked the American citizens to support war efforts in various ways. He stated his vision of a better future, founded upon four freedoms: "In the future days which we seek to make secure, we look forward to a world founded upon four essential human freedoms," some traditional and some new ones: freedom of speech, freedom of worship, freedom from want, and freedom from fear.

Roosevelt's January 6 State of the Union address became known as his "Four Freedoms Speech", due to its conclusion that described the President's vision of a worldwide extension of the American ideals of individual liberties summarized by these four freedoms. To put it another way, Roosevelt's speech was known for "identifying the objectives of the war and revealing his hopeful view of the postwar world". The speech helped to awaken Congress and the nation to the dire war calling, articulate ideological aims of the necessary armed conflict, and appeal to the universal American belief in freedom. Domestically, the Four Freedoms were not something Roosevelt was able to achieve through simple legislation, although they provided a theme for American military participation in the war. Of the Four Freedoms, the only two described in the United States Constitution were freedom of speech and freedom of worship.

== Rockwell and World War II ==
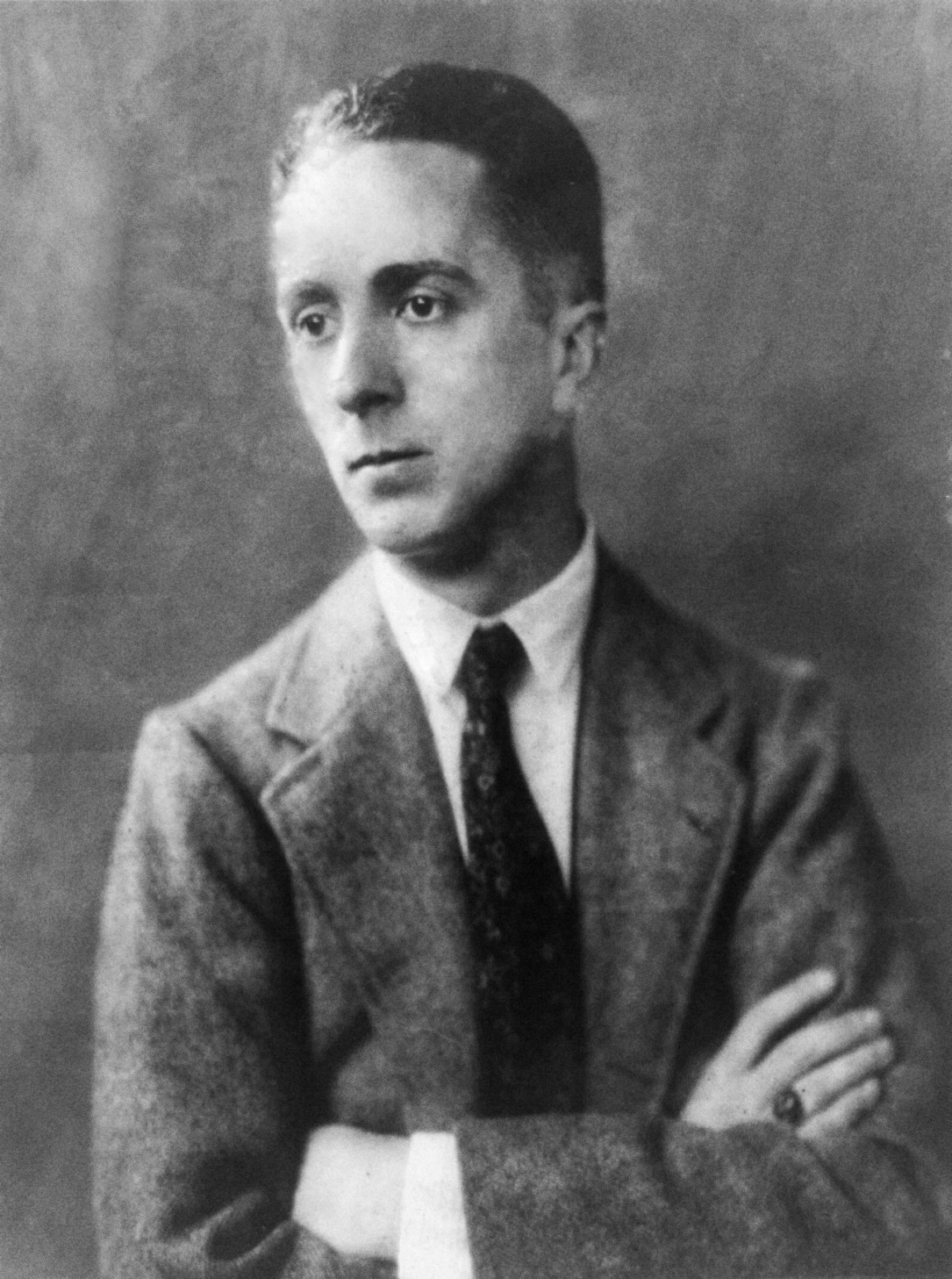
Norman Rockwell (pre-1923)

Between 1916 and his December 16, 1963 Kennedy Memorial cover, Rockwell created 322 magazine covers for The Saturday Evening Post, which was once the most widely read American magazine. In a pre-electronic era where mass production magazine color illustration was the most popular form of media, Rockwell became a national name, and by the 1950s was rivaled only by Walt Disney for his familiarity to the public among visual artists. During World War I, Rockwell had taken a bit of a back seat to more established illustrators under the editorship of George Horace Lorimer, who had died in 1937. Unfettered by Lorimer's restrictions, Rockwell saw the opportunity to illustrate the Four Freedoms as the chance of a lifetime.

Rockwell's covers highlighted the human aspect of the American war effort. The illustrations supported the effort by promoting war bonds and encouraging women to work and men to enlist. They employed themes of patriotism, longing, shifting gender roles, reunion, love, work, community, and family. In his role as a magazine illustrator during times of war, Rockwell draws comparisons to Winslow Homer, an American Civil War illustrator for Harper's Weekly.

The Four Freedoms had become an important theme for Artists for Victory. The consortium was one of several artists' organizations that provided the government with promotional artwork for the war. It also sponsored exhibits about global peace.

Rockwell was perceived as apolitical, but advocated "tolerance for differences, courtesy, kindness, and the freedoms that Roosevelt articulated". He believed Roosevelt's freedoms were worth fighting for, and he made numerous artistic contributions to the war efforts apart from the Four Freedoms. He is widely known for his idealized fictional wartime character Willie Gillis and his depiction of Rosie the Riveter. Some of his other war art is known by name, such as War News and Homecoming Soldier. He was responsible for encouraging individual monetary support of the war through posters like the 1943 Hasten the Homecoming.

== Composition ==
The job was too big for me ... It should have been tackled by Michelangelo.

— Norman Rockwell

Rockwell's Four Freedoms—Freedom of Speech, Freedom of Worship, Freedom from Want, and Freedom from Fear—were first published on February 20, February 27, March 6, and March 13, 1943, along with commissioned essays from leading American writers and historians (Booth Tarkington, Will Durant, Carlos Bulosan, and Stephen Vincent Benét, respectively). They measure 45.75 by 35.5 inches (116.2 by 90.2 cm) except for Freedom of Worship which measures 46.0 by 35.5 inches (116.8 by 90.2 cm). Rockwell used live models for all his paintings. In 1935, he began using black-and-white photographs of these live models extensively, although he did not publicly reveal he did so until 1940. The use of photography expanded the possibilities for Rockwell who could ask models to pose in positions they could hold only for brief periods of time. He could also produce works from new perspectives and the Four Freedoms represented "low vantage point of Freedom of Speech, to close-up in Freedom of Worship, midrange in Freedom from Fear, and wide angle in Freedom from Want".

In 1939, Rockwell moved to Arlington, Vermont, which was an artist-friendly community that had hosted Robert Frost, Rockwell Kent, and Dorothy Canfield Fisher. Of the move from New Rochelle, New York, Rockwell said "I was restless ... The town [of New Rochelle] seemed tinged with everything that happened to me". In New Rochelle, he had both endured a divorce and run with a fast crowd. Artists John Carlton Atherton, Mead Schaeffer, and George Hughes established residences in Arlington soon after Rockwell. The resident artists, Rockwell included, were mutually supportive and hired local citizens as their amateur models. Using photography and Arlington residents as models, Rockwell was able to capture what he referred to as "human-looking humans", who were generally working-class people, in an hour or so rather than hire professional models for the entire day. Rockwell paid his models modestly. Rose Hoyt, who was engaged for a total of three photographic sessions for Freedom of Speech and Freedom of Worship, earned $15 (equivalent to $295.57 in 2025) for her sittings.

When the US entered the war in 1941, it had three agencies responsible for war propaganda: The Office of Facts and Figures (OFF), The Division of Information of the Office of Emergency Management (OEM), and the Office of Government Reports (OGR). The OFF was responsible for commissioned artwork and for assembling a corps of writers, led by Librarian of Congress Archibald MacLeish. By mid-1942, the Office of War Information determined that despite the efforts of OFF in distributing pamphlets, posters, displays, and other media, only a third of the general public was familiar with Roosevelt's Four Freedoms and at most one in fifty could enumerate them. The Four Freedoms had been a "campaign to educate Americans about participation in World War II".

On May 24, 1942, Rockwell was seeking approval for a poster design at The Pentagon because the Artists Guild had designated that he'd advocate for the U.S. Army Ordnance Department. Robert Patterson, who was then United States Undersecretary of War, suggested revisions. On the same day, he visited with Thomas Mabry of the Graphic Division of the War Department's Office of Facts and Figures, which coordinated war-themed posters and billboards. Mabry relayed the need for Four Freedoms artwork. Rockwell returned home pondering the Atlantic Charter, which had incorporated the Four Freedoms.

Rockwell remembered a scene of a local town meeting in which one person spoke out in lone dissent, but was given the floor, and was listened to respectfully, despite his solitary opposition. He was inspired to use this scene to illustrate Freedom of Speech, and Rockwell decided to use his Vermont neighbors as models for an inspirational set of posters depicting the themes laid out by Roosevelt the previous year in a Four Freedoms series. He spent three days making charcoal sketches of the series, which some sources describe as color sketches. Rockwell's patriotic gesture was to travel to Washington, D.C., and volunteer his free services to the government for this cause. In mid-June, accompanied by Schaeffer, he took four charcoal sketches to Washington, where they stayed at the Mayflower Hotel, as the two sought commissions to design war art. During the trip, Rockwell was asked by the Boy Scouts of America to continue his annual creation of a new painting for their annual calendar by publishing representative Orion Winford. He was unable to hold Patterson's attention during their meeting, so he met with the new Office of War Information (OWI), where he was told "The last war you illustrators did the posters. This war we're going to use fine artists men, real artists."

On his return trip to Vermont with Schaeffer on June 16, they stopped in Philadelphia to meet with new Saturday Evening Post editor Ben Hibbs. Many accounts portray this visit as unplanned, but whether it was is unclear. Hibbs liked Rockwell's Four Freedoms sketches, and he gave Rockwell two months to complete the works. A June 24 correspondence from The Post clarified that both Rockwell's and Schaeffer's series would be published. By June 26, The Post's art editor James Yates notified Rockwell of plans for a layout of paintings with an accompanying essay or accompanying essays by President Roosevelt.

Rockwell's summer was full of distractions. At one point a Manhattan gastroenterologist prescribed a surgery of uncertain nature, though it was not performed. He had commissions for other magazines and business complications regarding second reproduction rights. He also had his Boy Scout commitment. Under time constraints, Rockwell made every excuse to avoid all other distracting assignments. In October, The Post sent its art editor to Arlington to check on Rockwell's progress. At about the same time, despite its Graphics Division chief Francis Brennan's outrage, the OWI began showing signs of renewed interest. In fact, after Rockwell was chosen the entire OWI Writers' Division resigned. The press release associated with the resignation asserted that the OWI was dominated by "high-pressure promoters who prefer slick salesmanship to honest information. These promoters would treat as stupid and reluctant customers the men and women of the United States." There was further turmoil in the OWI from a faction supporting work by Ben Shahn; Shahn's work was not used in propaganda because it lacked general appeal. Several artists were commissioned to promote the war, including Jean Carlu, Gerard Hordyke, Hugo Ballin, and Walter Russell. Russell created a Four Freedoms Monument that was eventually dedicated at Madison Square Garden in New York City.

The series took seven months to complete, and was finished by year-end. Supposedly, Rockwell lost 10 pounds (4.54 kg) from the assignment. As Rockwell was completing the series, he was motivated by news of Allied setbacks, a fact that gave the work a sense of urgency. Models included a Mrs. Harrington, who became the devout old woman in Freedom of Worship, and a man named Jim Martin, who appears in each painting in the series (most prominently in Freedom from Fear). The intention was to remind America what they were fighting for: freedom of speech and worship, freedom from want and fear. All the paintings used a muted palette and are devoid of the vermilion Rockwell is known for.

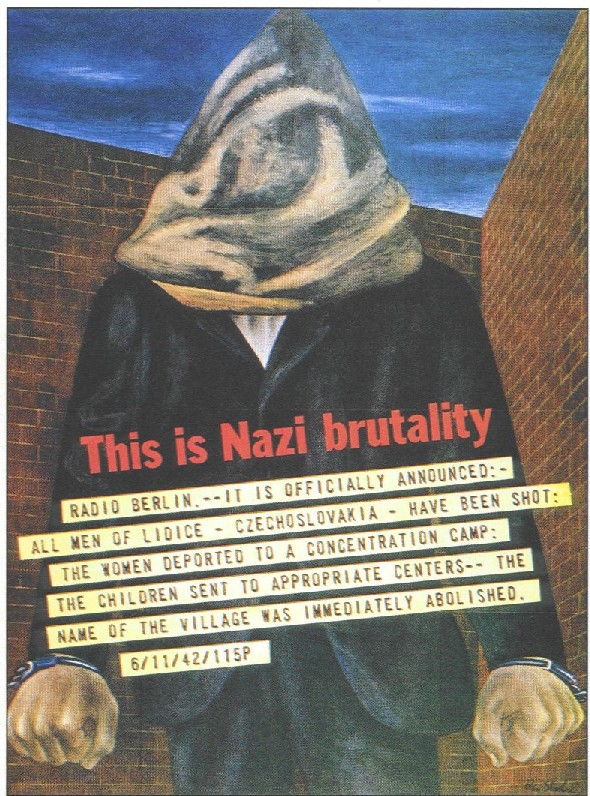
Example of a Ben Shahn poster that was passed over

Some sources published after Rockwell's death question whether the government was truly as discouraging as Rockwell claimed. They cite an encouraging April 23, 1943 correspondence with Thomas D. Mabry of the OWI (a former executive director of the Museum of Modern Art). At the time, the three government propaganda agencies were disjointed until they were unified under the OWI on June 13, 1942, by a Presidential Executive Order. Furthermore, the writers' division, led by MacLeish, was under pressure for failing to deliver a message intelligible to people of varying intelligence.

Upon completion, Rockwell's works were briefly exhibited at the West Arlington Grange before being delivered to The Post in Philadelphia. The series arrived in Philadelphia in January 1943. Roosevelt was shown the paintings in early February, and The Post sought Roosevelt's approval for the series of paintings and essays. Roosevelt responded with both a personal letter to Rockwell and an "official" letter of commendation to The Post dated February 10. Roosevelt instructed The Post to have the OWI have the essays translated into foreign languages so they could be presented to leaders at the United Nations.

The Freedoms were published in a series of four full-color, full-page editions, each accompanied by an essay of the same title. The panels were published in successive weeks in the order corresponding to Roosevelt's speech: Freedom of Speech (February 20), Freedom of Worship (February 27), Freedom from Want (March 6), and Freedom from Fear (March 13). For the authors of the accompanying essays, Hibbs had numerous options given the number of regular contributors to The Post.

== Aftermath ==
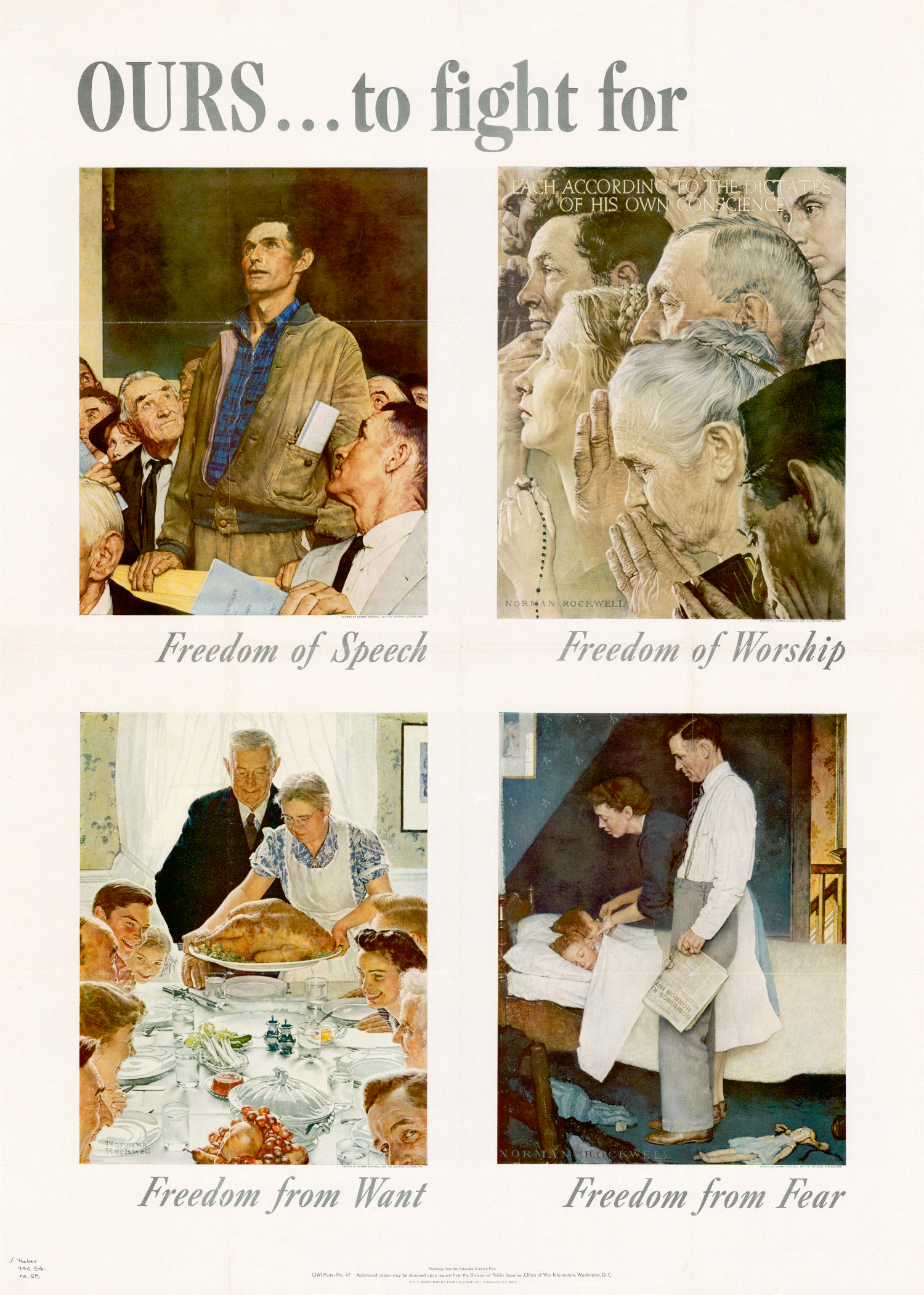
1943 poster showing all four paintings

When the series was published, The Saturday Evening Post received millions of reprint requests. They produced 25,000 sets, including both the essays and full-color reproductions of the paintings, sold at cost for $0.25 (equivalent to $4.65 in 2025). According to Rockwell, the OWI got involved and produced 2.5 million sets of Four Freedoms posters only after the public demanded reprints. By the end of the war, four million posters had been printed. Both the Freedom from Fear and Freedom from Want posters had the leading caption "ours … to fight for" and the Freedom of Speech and Freedom of Worship had the leading caption "Buy War Bonds" and the word "Save" before the respective freedom. A 1946 lithograph version of the 1943 paintings exists showing all four paintings under the heading "ours … to fight for".

The Four Freedoms were issued as posters by the United States Government Printing Office and as postage stamps by the United States Postal Service. They were used as commemorative covers for war bonds and postage stamps offered during the War Bond show. The stamps are not to be confused with the February 12, 1943 one-cent Four Freedoms Postage Stamp Issue by another artist. The Rockwell versions were issued in a set of four fifty-cent stamps in 1994, the 100th anniversary of Rockwell's birth. Freedom from Want was included as the cover image of the 1946 book Norman Rockwell, Illustrator that was written when Rockwell was "at the height of his fame as America's most popular illustrator". By 1972, this 1946 publication was in its seventh printing. Although the paintings were originally intimately connected to Roosevelt and the American cause in World War II, the paintings have now developed an independent iconic identity in textbooks and on ties as well as in the cultural and social fabric. By the end of the 20th century, 25 million people bought Rockwell's Four Freedoms prints. Over time, the series became widely distributed in a poster form and became instrumental in the U. S. Government War Bond Drive. War Bonds are "debt securities issued by a government to finance military operations and other expenditure in times of war."

Rockwell noted that the series took an emotional toll on him, saying the works were "serious paintings which sucked the energy right out of me like dredges, leaving me dazed and thoroughly weary". His subsequent assignment was to produce the 1943 April Fools' Day cover for The Post, which was much more relaxing.

Rockwell was solicited for a variety of works following the publication of the Four Freedoms. Massachusetts Representative Edith Nourse Rogers put forth a congressional resolution to declare a fifth freedom: "Freedom of Private Enterprise". Bronx Inter-Racial Conference chairman Roderick Stephens, requested Rockwell's services to highlight the need for improved interracial relations in a series that would complement the original Four Freedoms. Rockwell and Stephens communicated, and, over the course of his career, Rockwell did contemplate and depict race relations in several works, but not as a series.

== War Bond Drive ==
Between 1941 and 1946, the United States Department of the Treasury conducted eight War Loan Drives to promote the sale of war bonds to finance America's World War II efforts. The government used several forms of solicitation, advertising, and marketing, such as aircraft carrier exhibits. For the Seventh War Loan Drive, they used direct appeals from all five-star generals and admirals (George Marshall, Dwight Eisenhower, Douglas MacArthur, Henry H. Arnold, Ernest King, Chester W. Nimitz, and William D. Leahy), and used a commemorative bond image of Franklin Delano Roosevelt in the Eighth War Loan Drive. The marketing attempts were quite varied even within a single War Loan Drive.

The War Bond Drives were viewed as key in boosting national morale by giving citizens the opportunity to support the war effort. They boosted patriotism and were a good marketing device for drumming up support. Not only did celebrities promote the bonds for free, most of the air time and advertising space was donated. The first War Loan Drive, known as "The Victory Loan Drive", began in early 1942. It was initiated by Roosevelt and United States Secretary of the Treasury Henry Morgenthau and raised $13 billion. Despite its success, only 35% of Americans understood the objectives of the war.

Between January and April 1943, The Post and the United States Department of the Treasury collaborated to plan the Second War Bond Drive tour featuring the Four Freedoms beginning at Hecht's in Washington, D.C. Thousands of people volunteered to be part of the War Bond Drive and The Post used its resources to promote the tour. In 1943, the Saturday Evening Post donated the Four Freedoms to the Second War Loan Drive. The OWI assumed the lead in marketing the Bond Drive. Using an all-star celebrity roster and the Hollywood Writers Mobilization, they created a March 1943 radio dramatization via their "Free World Theater". The OWI produced and distributed posters of the Four Freedoms to 400,000 retailers via the Boy Scouts and began receiving 2,000 daily poster requests.

The tour began on April 26, 1943, at Hecht's. Rockwell was present at the debut to make obligatory appearances in front of ambassadors and dignitaries and to sign autographs. In the subsequent days, he sketched people in the White House waiting room using charcoal. Due to strained relations with The Post, Secretary Morgenthau did not attend the debut. The show ran for eleven days in Washington, D.C., with a wide variety of celebratory festivities, such as hourly featured guests and entertainers, chorus performances, and military unit exhibitions. The second stop of the tour coincided with the 75th anniversary of Strawbridge and Clothier in Philadelphia. Bob Hope, Bing Crosby, and Durant were among the celebrities on hand. The tour arrived at New York City's Rockefeller Center on June 4 with festivities that featured Kate Smith. The tour arrived in Boston on June 19 at Filene's. Subsequent stops included Buffalo (July 12), Rochester, New York (August 2), and Pittsburgh (September 8). In the Midwest, the show stopped in Detroit (September 27), Cleveland (October 25) and Chicago (November 11). Other stops in the Midwest and West included St. Louis (December 16), New Orleans (January 16, 1944), Dallas (January 27), Los Angeles (February 12), Portland, Oregon (March 27), and Denver (May 1).

Bond purchasers received full-color reproduction sets. During the 16-city tour, which included various celebrities, public officials, and entertainers, approximately 1.2 million people throughout the United States viewed the paintings, which helped to raise $132 million for the war effort through the sale of war bonds. According to The New Yorker in 1945, the Four Freedoms "were received by the public with more enthusiasm, perhaps, than any other paintings in the history of American art". Rockwell is widely credited with contributing to the success of the war effort. However, Rockwell only took part in the war bond tour when it was convenient for his other interests. He did not travel with the tour which lasted a year.

== Critical reception ==
Rockwell is considered the "quintessential middlebrow American artist" by Michael Kelly. As an artist he is an illustrator rather than a fine arts painter. Although his style is painterly, his work is produced for the purpose of mass reproduction, and it is produced with the intent of delivering a common message to its viewers via a detailed narrative style. Furthermore, the vast majority of Rockwell's work was viewed in reproduced format and almost none of his contemporaneous audience ever saw his original work. Also, Rockwell's style of backwoods New England small-town realism, known as regionalism, was sometimes viewed as out of step with the oncoming wave of abstract modern art. Some say his realism is so direct that he abstains from using artistic license. John Canaday, a New York Times art critic, once referred to Rockwell as the "Rembrandt of Punkin' Crick" for his aversion to the vices of big city life. Dave Hickey derided Rockwell for painting without inflection. Some critics also view his sentimental and nostalgic vision as out of step with the harsh realities of American life, such as the Great Depression. Deborah Solomon views the works as being "based on lofty civic principles", but rather than dealing with the warring patriots, they present themes with "civic and familial rituals" for "emblematic scenes".

Post editor Hibbs said the Four Freedoms were an "inspiration ... in the same way that the clock tower of old Independence Hall, which I can see from my office window, inspires me." Roosevelt wrote to Rockwell "I think you have done a superb job in bringing home to the plain, everyday citizen the plain, everyday truths behind the Four Freedoms ... I congratulate you not alone on the execution but also for the spirit which impelled you to make this contribution to the common cause of a freer, happier world". Roosevelt wrote to The Post, "This is the first pictorial representation I have seen of the staunchly American values contained in the rights of free speech and free worship and our goals of freedom from fear and want." Roosevelt also wrote of the corresponding essays, "Their words should inspire all who read them with a deeper appreciation of the way of life we are striving to preserve."

The Four Freedoms are perhaps Rockwell's most famous work. Some have said Rockwell's Four Freedoms lack artistic maturity. Others have pointed to the universality of the Freedom of Religion as disconcerting to practitioners of particular faiths. Others complained that he idealized American life because by depicting wholesome, healthy, and happy sentiments, Rockwell depicted the good that was remembered or wished for, but by avoiding misery, poverty, and social unrest, he failed to demonstrate command of the bad and the ugly parts of American life. Rockwell's response to this criticism was, "I paint life as I would like it to be." Rockwell made it known that he hoped these would be his masterpieces, but was disappointed. Nonetheless, he was satisfied with the public acceptance of the series and that the series was able to serve such a patriotic purpose. Laura Claridge feels he might have achieved his ambition if he had pursued the "quiet small scenes" he later became known for.

Although all four images were intended to promote patriotism in a time of war, Freedom from Want, which depicts an elderly couple serving a fat turkey to what looks like a table of happy and eager children and grandchildren, has given the idyllic 'Norman Rockwell Thanksgiving' as important a place in the promoting of family togetherness, peace and plenty as Hallmark movies at Christmas. Some say the Four Freedoms were unable to live up to the role of "illustrating grandiose concepts with humble correlatives" because they are too loud.

The success of Rockwell's depictions was due to his use of long-standing American cultural values about unity and respect of certain institutions while using symbols that enabled a broad audience to identify with his images. This understandability made it one extreme on the scale of artistic complexity when comparing the series to contemporaneous art. It was diametrically opposed to abstract art and far removed from the intrigue of surrealism.

In 1999, the High Museum of Art and the Norman Rockwell Museum produced the first comprehensive exhibition of Rockwell's career that started at the High Museum on November 6, 1999, stopped at the Chicago Historical Society, Corcoran Gallery of Art, San Diego Museum of Art, Phoenix Art Museum, and Norman Rockwell Museum before concluding at the Solomon R. Guggenheim Museum on February 11, 2002. Although there has been a long history of Rockwell detractors, during this Norman Rockwell: Pictures for the American People touring exhibition attendance was record-setting and critical reviews were quite favorable. The nostalgia seemed to cause a bit of revisionism in the art world, according to The New York Times which said, "What's odd is the show's enthusiastic reception by the art world, which in a lather of revisionism is falling all over itself to embrace what it once reviled: the comfy, folksy narrative visions of a self-deprecating illustrator ..."

Some found Rockwell's presentation somewhat patronizing, but most were satisfied. The New Yorker remarked two years later: "They were received by the public with more enthusiasm, perhaps, than any other paintings in the history of American Art". Claridge notes that the series is an example in which the sum is greater than its parts. She notes the inspiration comes in part from their cumulative "heft".

== Provenance ==
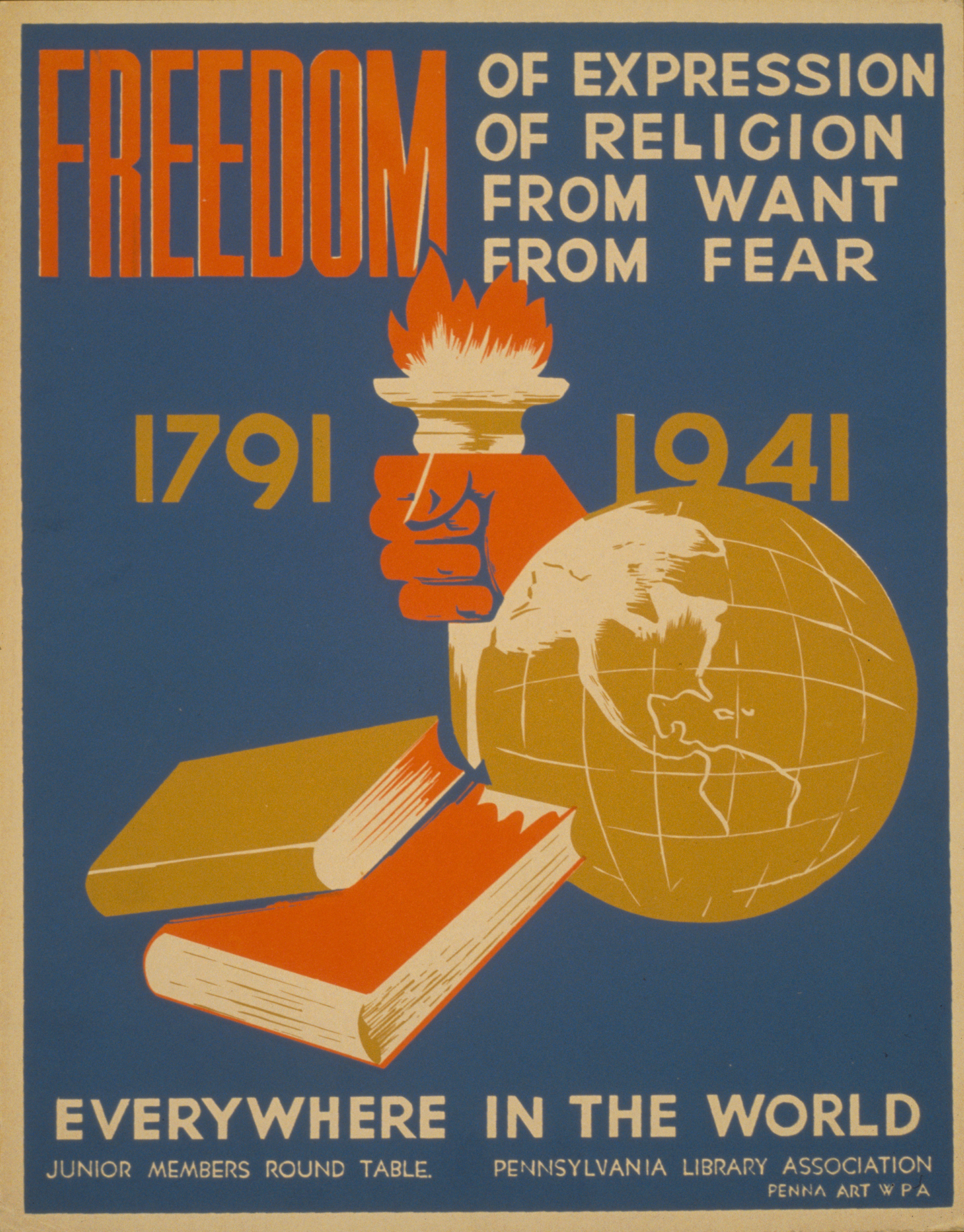
Poster promoting Roosevelt's Four Freedoms (1941)

Following the 1943–44 War Bond Show, the Four Freedoms toured the country further by train in a specially designed car. Through the 1950s the Four Freedoms hung in Hibbs's offices at The Post. Hibbs retired in 1961 and by the time The Post was discontinued in 1969, Rockwell regained possession of the original paintings. Norman Rockwell bequeathed his personal collection in trust to the Norman Rockwell Museum in 1973 for the "advancement of art appreciation and art education". This collection included the Four Freedoms paintings. The works remained on exhibit at The Norman Rockwell Museum at The Old Corner House for nearly 25 years. In 1993, when the Rockwell Museum moved from its original location, the Four Freedoms were displayed in the new museum's central gallery. As of 2014, the Four Freedoms remain in the collection of the Museum. In 2011, the Williamstown Art Conservation Center did some work on the Four Freedoms, including reducing exposure to various elements and preventing further wear.

== Exhibitions ==
The Four Freedoms were widely exhibited as part of the sixteen-city Second War Loan Drive in 1943 and have subsequently been part of other tours and exhibitions. They were a highlight of the first comprehensive Rockwell touring exhibition, entitled Norman Rockwell: Pictures for the American People, which was a seven-city tour that ran from November 1999 until February 2002. They returned to the Corcoran Gallery of Art, which had been part of the Pictures for the American People tour, for an exhibition in association with the National World War II Memorial grand opening in 2004. In addition to being included in various tours, the Four Freedoms were the subject of a 144-page book in 1993, the fiftieth anniversary of their production.

In addition to exhibitions of the Four Freedoms by Rockwell, there have been tribute exhibitions of works by other artists depicting these themes. For example, in 2008 at the Wolfsonian museum at Florida International University, 60 artists exhibited 80 works that represented their takes on the Four Freedoms. Other artists, such as Thomas Kinkade, have found individual inspiration in Rockwell's patriotic works, resulting in their own works using different symbols to present similar themes.
