= Bennington Banner =

Newspaper in Bennington, Vermont

The Bennington Banner
- Type: Daily newspaper
- Format: Broadsheet
- Owner(s): Vermont News and Media LLC
- Publisher: Jordan Brechenser
- Editor: Managing Editor: Tim Wassberg
- Founded: 1841
- Language: English
- Headquarters: 423 Main Street; Bennington, Vermont 05201; United States
- Website: benningtonbanner.com

The Bennington Banner is a daily newspaper published in Bennington, Vermont. The paper covers local, national, and world news. It is distributed throughout Southwestern Vermont and eastern New York (Rensselaer and Washington Counties). The paper is owned by Vermont News and Media LLC and is published Monday through Friday, plus a weekend edition.

== History ==
Vermont newspaperman and Republican politician, Frank E. Howe, bought two Bennington, Vermont, weeklies in 1902 and merged them to form the daily Bennington Banner, of which he was publisher and editor.

Around 1960–1961, the Bennington Banner was purchased by Lawrence Miller and his brother Donald, the sons of Kelton B. Miller, a politician and newspaperman in nearby Pittsfield, Massachusetts. Kelton's grandson, also named Kelton Miller, served as publisher of the Banner from 1977 until 1995, at which point it was purchased by MediaNews Group.

Under MediaNews Group ownership, Jim Therrien served as managing editor of the Banner from 2006 to 2012. MediaNews Group eventually combined with other entities and re-branded as Digital First Media.

In 2016, the Banner and other newspapers in the New England Newspapers Inc. portfolio were purchased from Digital First Media by a group of Berkshire County, Massachusetts-based investors. In May 2021 the New England Newspapers sold Bennington Banner, Brattleboro Reformer and Manchester Journal to Vermont News and Media LLC

== Freedom from Fear painting ==
A copy of the Bennington Banner is shown in Norman Rockwell's painting Freedom from Fear, one of the paintings in his Four Freedoms series.

== Controversy ==
In early 2007 the Bennington Banner came under fire from The O'Reilly Factor for allegedly not taking an editorial stance on a legal case involving child molestation, an accusation disputed by the newspaper's editor at the time, Jim Therrien.
