= Four Freedoms Monument =

Monument in Florida

Coordinates: 30°28′10.5″N 83°24′46.0″W

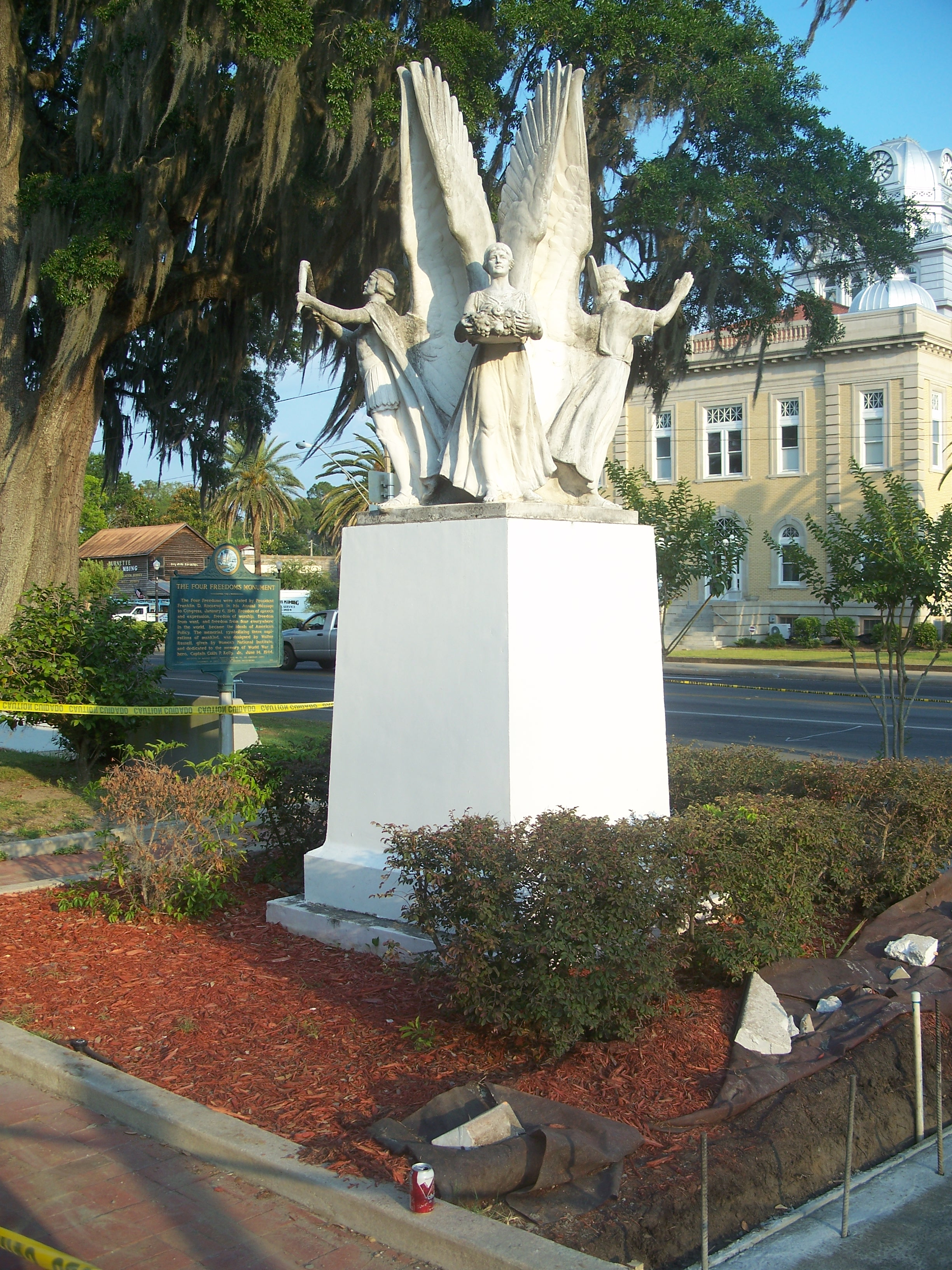
Four Freedoms Monument, Madison, Florida

State of the Union (Four Freedoms) (January 6, 1941)
Franklin Delano Roosevelt's January 6, 1941 State of the Union Address introducing the theme of the Four Freedoms (starting at 32:02)

The Four Freedoms Monument was commissioned by President Franklin D. Roosevelt following his articulation of the "Four Freedoms" in his 1941 State of the Union Address. This was yet before the Attack on Pearl Harbor and the participation of the United States in World War II. Roosevelt felt that, through the medium of the arts, a far greater number of people could be inspired to appreciate the concept of the Four Freedoms.

According to Roosevelt, the four fundamental freedoms are:

- Freedom of speech and expression
- Freedom of worship
- Freedom from want
- Freedom from fear

The statue was created by sculptor Walter Russell later that year, and was funded by the Women's National Institute. In 1943 it was dedicated to Colin P. Kelly, one of the first recognized American heroes of World War II, before a crowd of 60,000 people at Madison Square Garden in New York City. On June 14, 1944, the monument was re-dedicated in Kelly's hometown of Madison, Florida, with a speech by Governor Spessard Holland.

== Related monuments ==
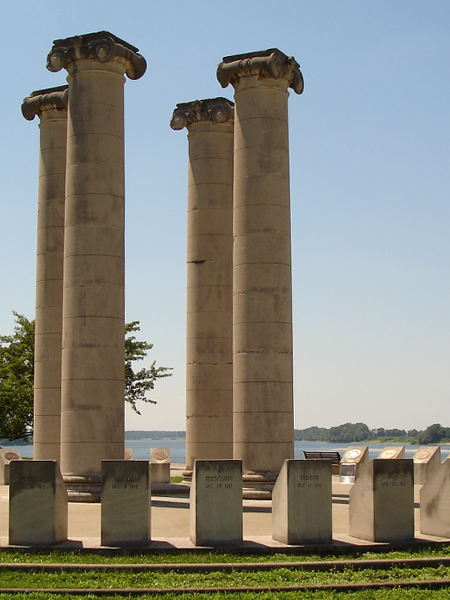
Four Freedoms Monument, Evansville, Indiana

The Four Freedoms monument in Evansville, Indiana, was designed by Evansville architect Rupert Condict. It consists of four 24-foot (7.3 m) tall ionic Indiana limestone columns, each inscribed with one of the four freedoms. Surrounding these central columns are 50 uniformly shaped blocks representing the 50 states of the United States. Each block represents a state and shows its state seal and its date of becoming a state. The monument was dedicated in 1976 in commemoration of the United States Bicentennial.

The Four Freedoms Monument of Cleveland, Ohio, is located in the Tremont neighborhood. It consists of a single column, with one of the four freedoms printed on each side. On top of the column is a sculpture of two hands holding a globe of the Earth.

== See also ==
- Four Freedoms, 1943 painting series by Norman Rockwell
- Four Freedoms Award
- Franklin D. Roosevelt Four Freedoms Park in New York
