= Freedom from Fear (painting) =

1943 painting by Norman Rockwell

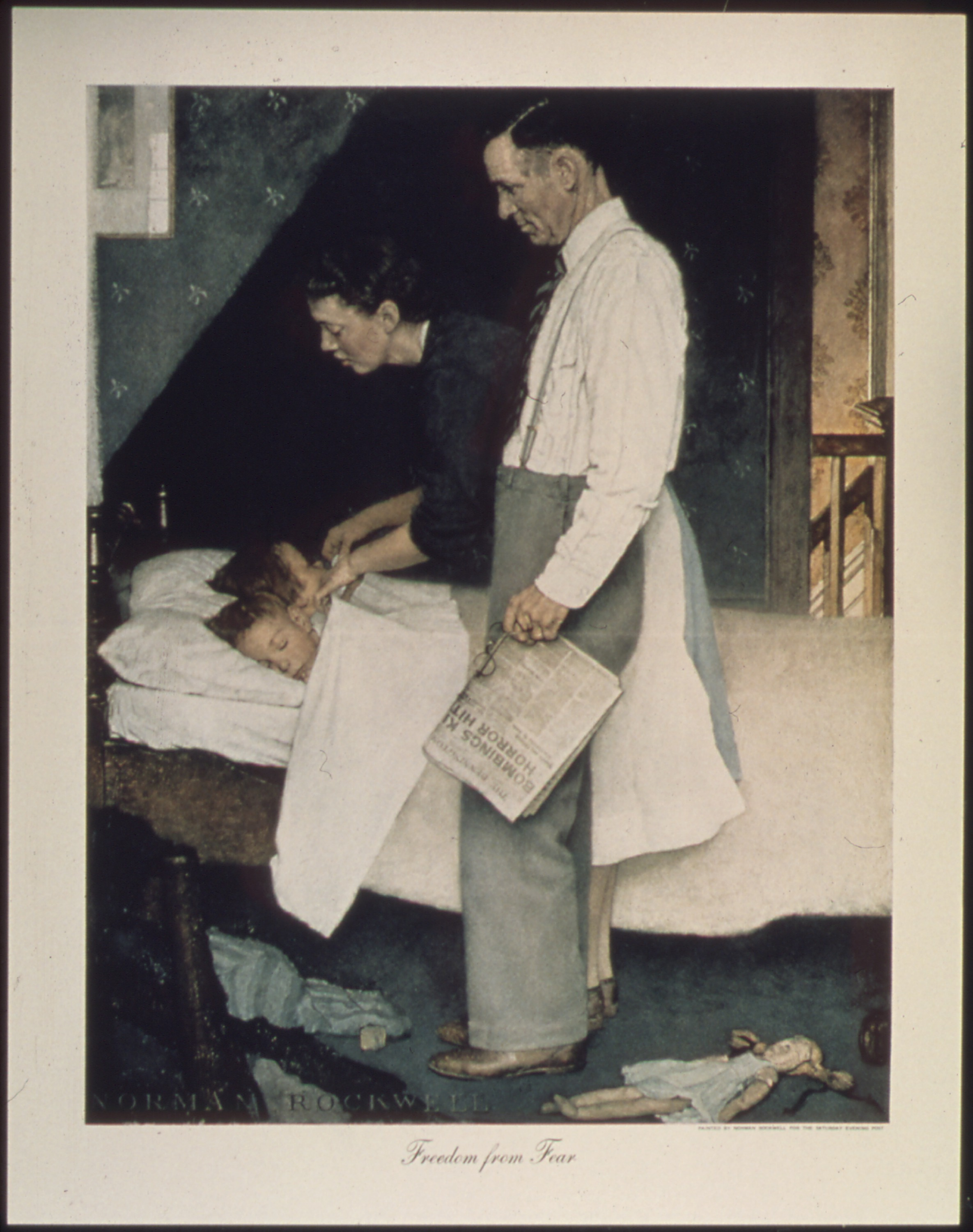
- Artist: Norman Rockwell
- Year: 1943
- Medium: Oil on canvas
- Dimensions: 116.2 cm × 90 cm (45.75 in × 35.5 in)
- Location: Norman Rockwell Museum, Stockbridge, Massachusetts, U.S.

Freedom from Fear is the last of the Four Freedoms oil paintings produced by the American artist Norman Rockwell. The series was based on the four goals known as the Four Freedoms, which were enunciated by President Franklin D. Roosevelt in his State of the Union Address on January 6, 1941. This work was published in the March 13, 1943, issue of The Saturday Evening Post alongside an essay by a prominent thinker of the day, Stephen Vincent Benét. The painting is generally described as depicting American children being tucked into bed by their parents while the Blitz rages across the Atlantic in the United Kingdom.

== Background ==
Freedom from Fear is the last of a series of four oil paintings entitled Four Freedoms, painted by Norman Rockwell. The works were inspired by President Franklin D. Roosevelt in a State of the Union Address delivered to the 77th United States Congress on January 6, 1941; the speech itself is often called the Four Freedoms. The Four Freedoms theme was eventually incorporated into the Atlantic Charter, and it became part of the charter of the United Nations. The series of paintings was printed in The Saturday Evening Post, accompanied by essays from noted writers, on four consecutive weeks in early 1943: Freedom of Speech (February 20), Freedom of Worship (February 27), Freedom from Want (March 6) and Freedom from Fear (March 13). Eventually, the series was widely distributed in poster form and became instrumental in the U.S. Government's Second War Bond Drive.

The Blitz was a period of sustained strategic bombing of the United Kingdom by Germany during the Second World War. Between 7 September 1940 and 21 May 1941, sixteen British cities were hit by major aerial raids. Beginning on 7 September 1940, London was bombed by the Luftwaffe for 57 consecutive nights. Overall, more than one million London houses were destroyed or damaged during the Blitz, and more than 40,000 civilians were killed, almost half of them in London.

== Description ==
The painting shows children resting safely in their beds, oblivious to the perils of this world, as their parents look on. Their mother tucks them in while their father holds a newspaper describing the horrors of the ongoing conflict. However, his attention is fully on his children and not on the alarming headlines. According to another view, the children are already asleep, and their parents are checking on them in their shared narrow bed before they themselves turn in for the night. The father appears as the "classic Rockwell onlooker" who serves as a viewer within the painting. Since he is holding his glasses, we assume that he has finished reading the Bennington Banner in his hand. The newspaper's headline reads "Bombings Ki ... Horror Hit...", referencing the Blitz. In the background is a lit hallway and a stairway leading to the first floor.

According to Rockwell, who did not really care much for the work, the theme "was based on a rather smug idea. Painted during the bombing of London, it was supposed to say, 'Thank God we can put our children to bed with a feeling of security, knowing they will not be killed in the night.'"

== Production ==
The models for the work were Jim Martin, Mrs. Edgar Lawrence (Dorothy), and two children of Rockwell's carpenter Walt Squires, all neighbors of Rockwell in Arlington, Vermont. At Rockwell's request, the Bennington Banner produced a dummy edition to use for this work. Freedom from Fear was published in the March 13, 1943 Issue of The Saturday Evening Post with a matching essay by Stephen Vincent Benét as part of the Four Freedoms series. Coincidentally, the day it was published, poet, novelist, and short-story writer Benét died.

== History ==
The fourth is freedom from fear—which, translated into world terms, means a world-wide reduction of armaments to such a point and in such a thorough fashion that no nation will be in a position to commit an act of physical aggression against any neighbor—anywhere in the world.

— Franklin Delano Roosevelt's January 6, 1941 State of the Union address introducing the theme of the Four Freedoms

This painting is the only one of the Four Freedoms which had been newly created prior to the commissioning of the series. It had originally been created to depict the Battle of Britain, but went unpublished by The Saturday Evening Post. The United States Department of the Treasury toured Rockwell's Four Freedoms paintings around the country after their publication in 1943. The Four Freedoms Tour raised over $130,000,000 in war bond sales. Rockwell's Four Freedoms paintings were also reproduced as commemorative covers for postage stamps sold during the War Bond shows.

== Critical review ==
The scene has been described as overly intimate. Both the arrangement of the furniture and the lighting contribute to this intimacy. Deborah Solomon describes the scene as having "some of the feeling of a French interior, with lovely haut-art touches. Bruce Cole of The Wall Street Journal stated "This reference to the war is so specific that it conveys little about fear or Roosevelt's plan for universal disarmament. Rockwell just could not get his hands around these airy abstractions."
