= Ben Hibbs =

American journalist (1901-1975)

Ben Hibbs (July 23, 1901 – March 30, 1975) was born in Fontana, Kansas and earned an A.B. from the University of Kansas in 1923.

In 1942, Hibbs began a twenty-year association with the editorial staff of The Saturday Evening Post. During the Eisenhower administration, Hibbs persuaded the President to sign a contract calling for him to write four articles a year for publication in The Post beginning after Eisenhower left the White House. During Hibbs’ final year with The Post, 1962, he served as senior editor and began working directly with General Eisenhower on articles he prepared for the magazine.

Hibbs left The Post in January 1963 and joined the editorial staff of Reader’s Digest, owned by DeWitt Wallace. When Eisenhower’s contract with The Post expired in 1964, Hibbs was responsible for the General’s signing a new contract agreeing to write three articles a year for Reader’s Digest at a fee of $30,000 per article. Hibbs was the editor assigned to collaborate with Eisenhower in producing these articles.

The general procedure followed in producing an Eisenhower article was begun when a topic, originated by the General, Hibbs, or The Reader’s Digest editors, was decided upon. Eisenhower and Hibbs then agreed to a meeting time several weeks in advance and proceeded to accumulate ideas and facts for the article. They would then meet several times at either Gettysburg or Palm Springs to discuss the article, working from an outline prepared by Hibbs. From these conversations, and the notes Hibbs compiled from them, a draft of the article was created. It was then sent to Eisenhower for his comments and editing before being submitted to the executive editor of The Reader’s Digest, Hobart Lewis, for final editing.

Hibbs first met Eisenhower during the last year of World War II, when the General requested that reporters from the United States be flown to Europe to document the horrors of the Nazi concentration camps then being liberated by the U.S. Army. Hibbs and the other correspondents were shown the Dachau concentration camp and the Buchenwald concentration camp before being introduced to Eisenhower at his SHAEF (Supreme Headquarters Allied Expeditionary Force) headquarters. Following the war, Hibbs attempted to purchase for The Post the magazine rights to General Eisenhower’s memoirs, Crusade in Europe, but was unsuccessful when Eisenhower sold those rights to Life.

Hibbs actively promoted the candidacy of Eisenhower for the Presidency of the United States in 1952. He wrote an editorial entitled "Will the Republicans Commit Suicide in Chicago" concerning the Taft-Eisenhower battle over the seating of Republican delegates from Texas.

Hibbs was never a part of the inner White House Group during the Eisenhower administrations. However, he did remain an acquaintance of the President and was invited to attend stag dinners and other social functions. His close association with Eisenhower developed after the President left office and began writing articles for The Post and Reader’s Digest.
