= Laura Claridge =

American author (born 1962)

Laura P. Claridge (born 1952 in Clearwater, Florida) was an American author known primarily for her biographies of major 20th century figures, forcing re-examination of popular icons including Art Deco painter Tamara de Lempicka, Emily Post and Norman Rockwell. Claridge was a tenured English professor at the United States Naval Academy until 1997. She received an award from the National Endowment for the Humanities, and her 2008 biography of Emily Post received the J Anthony Lukas Award, administered by Harvard University's Neiman Foundation for Journalism and the Columbia University Graduate School of Journalism. She had written for the Wall Street Journal, Boston Globe, Los Angeles Times, Vogue, and the Christian Science Monitor. Claridge had appeared on the Today Show on NBC, CNN, BBC, CBS, NPR and ABC.

== Biography ==
Claridge was born in Clearwater, Florida. She received her Ph.D. from the University of Maryland. She later taught at Converse College, Wofford College, and the United States Naval Academy.

She began her writing career as a British Romantic and feminist scholar. With Elizabeth Langland, she edited Out of Bounds: Male Writers and Gender(ed) Criticism (1990). In 1992, she wrote Romantic Potency: The Paradox of Desire. Tamara de Lempicka: A Life of Deco and Decadence was published in 1998, as well as the following year in the UK, Germany, Spain, and Poland. Norman Rockwell: A Life, the first critical biography of the popular American artist, appeared in the fall of 2001. Emily Post: Mistress of American Manners, Daughter of the Gilded Age was published in the fall of 2008. Laura Claridge's biography of the pioneering publisher and co-founder of Knopf Publishing, Blanche Knopf, The Lady with the Borzoi was published by Farrar, Straus, and Giroux in April 2016. The Times Literary Supplement hailed it as "an impressive achievement," while The New York Times made it an Editor's Choice.

Claridge lived in Saugerties, New York, until her death at age 74.

== Bibliography ==
=== Books ===
- Claridge, Laura (2016). The Lady with the Borzoi: Blanche Knopf, Literary Tastemaker Extraordinaire. New York: Farrar, Straus and Giroux. ISBN 978-0-374-11425-1.
- Claridge, Laura (2008). Emily Post: Daughter of the Gilded Age, Mistress of American Manners. New York: Random House. ISBN 978-0-8129-6741-8.
- Claridge, Laura (2004). Booknotes: On American Character. PublicAffairs.

(Compilation edited by CSPAN's Brian Lamb. Contains "Laura Claridge on Norman Rockwell's Portraits of America" in addition to writers including Michael Moore, Maya Lin, Ann Coulter, Arthur Schlesinger Jr, Simon Winchester, Isaac Stern, Sandra Day O'Connor and others.)

- Claridge, Laura (2001). Norman Rockwell: A Life. New York: Random House.
- Claridge, Laura (1999). Tamara de Lempicka: A Life of Deco and Decadence. New York: Random House/Clarkson Potter.
- Claridge, Laura (1992). Romantic Potency: The Paradox of Desire. Ithaca: Cornell University.
- Claridge, Laura (1990). Out of Bounds: Male Writers and Gender(ed) Criticism. Amherst: University of Massachusetts Press.
  - co-editor, with Elizabeth Langland
