= Deborah Solomon =

American journalist (born 1957)

- Born: August 9, 1957 (age 69); New York City, U.S.
- Occupations: Journalist; art critic; biographer
- Spouse: Kent Sepkowitz
- Children: 2

Deborah Solomon (born August 9, 1957) is an American art critic, journalist and biographer. She writes for The New York Times, where she was previously a columnist. Her weekly column, "Questions For" ran in The New York Times Magazine from 2003 to 2011. She was subsequently the art critic for WNYC Public Radio, the New York City affiliate of NPR. She is sometimes confused with another reporter, Deborah B. Solomon, who is a financial journalist now working at The New York Times after a long career at The Wall Street Journal.

== Early life and education ==
Solomon was born in New York City and grew up in New Rochelle, New York. Her parents, Jerry and Sally Solomon, owned an art gallery. In an interview with Francis Ford Coppola, Solomon disclosed that her father was born in Romania and fled as a child in 1938. She was educated at Cornell University, where she majored in art history and served as the associate editor of The Cornell Daily Sun. She earned a Bachelor of Arts degree in 1979. The following year, she received a master's degree from the Columbia University Graduate School of Journalism. Solomon was awarded a Guggenheim Fellowship in 2001 in the category of biography.

== Career ==
=== Journalism ===
Solomon began her career writing about art for various publications, including The New Criterion. For most of the 1990s, she served as the chief art critic of The Wall Street Journal. She has written extensively about American painting and is a frequent interviewer on art subjects. She has also written three biographies of American artists.

In 2003, The New York Times Magazine hired her to author a regular weekly column in which she interviewed various people. She became "an expert at forcing her subjects... to say something" and developed a reputation as a "bulldog" interviewer, "one of the toughest interviewers around." According to Kat Stoeffel in an opinion piece for The New York Observer, Solomon's weekly "Questions For" column "has been a slow-burning controversy since Ms. Solomon’s debut in 2003. Ms. Solomon’s editing practices (despite the weekly disclaimer) led some of her subjects–including Tim Russert, Ira Glass, and Amy Dickinson–to cry foul. But then some weeks’ interviews–Das Racist comes to mind–seemed to redeem the whole practice."

On November 29, 2010, at the 92nd Street Y in New York, Solomon interviewed actor Steve Martin regarding his new novel, An Object of Beauty, which is based in the New York art world. The interview became "a debacle" when, midway through the conversation, a Y representative handed Solomon a note asking her to talk more about Martin's movie career. The next day, the Y issued an apology and refund offer to the audience. In an op-ed in The New York Times, Martin, a serious art collector, praised Solomon as an "art scholar" and said he would have rather "died onstage with art talk" than discuss movie trivia as the Y apparently preferred.

On February 4, 2011, Solomon stepped down from writing her weekly column to write in house and continue her biography of Norman Rockwell. She was "encouraged by the paper’s top brass to continue writing for the paper" and has stated she will continue "asking as many impertinent questions as possible.” In 2010, Solomon was ranked by the Daily Beast as one of "The Left's Top 25 Journalists."

=== Books ===
Solomon has written three biographies of American artists: Jackson Pollock: A Biography (Simon & Schuster, 1987, ISBN 978-0-8154-1182-6); Utopia Parkway: The Life and Work of Joseph Cornell (Farrar, Straus & Giroux, 1997, ISBN 0-374-18012-1); and American Mirror: The Life and Art of Norman Rockwell (Farrar, Straus & Giroux, 2013, ISBN 978-0-374-11309-4). She is currently at work on a full-scale biography of the American artist Jasper Johns, who authorized the book, and about whom she has written since 1988. Johns has specified that the book cannot be published until after his death.

Utopia Parkway was described in Slate as a "fascinating account of Cornell's life" which "narrowed the distance between the life and the art, chronicling everything with a sympathy and even a generosity one would hardly have dreamt possible in our cynical and deconstructive age."

The Norman Rockwell biography, American Mirror, received the most attention. It was "controversial" but garnered "generally positive reviews". The book was described as an "engaging and ultimately sad" portrait of Rockwell which "fully justifies a fresh look at his life";, as a "sympathetic and probing new biography"; and as a "brilliantly insightful chronicle of the life of illustrator Norman Rockwell". Controversy arose because in the book she suggests that Rockwell may have been a closeted homosexual. In a review for The New York Times, Garrison Keillor noted sarcastically ("Oh, come on!") that she "does seem awfully eager to find homoeroticism" in Rockwell's work. She also "detected a pattern of pedophilia" in his selection and portrayal of child models. Rockwell's family angrily denied the implications. The artist's son Thomas Rockwell told The Boston Globe, "The biography is so poor and so inflammatory, we just had to respond... It's being presented as the definitive biography and it's so wrong, we just felt we had to correct the record." Rockwell's granddaughter Abigail has written several articles denouncing Solomon's book as a "disaster" and a "fraud".

== Personal life ==
Solomon is married to Kent Sepkowitz, an infectious-disease specialist and the Deputy Physician-in-Chief at Memorial Sloan Kettering Cancer Center and frequent contributor to various publications. They have two sons.

== Awards and honors ==
- 1998 New York Public Library Books to Remember Award, for Utopia Parkway
- 2001 John Simon Guggenheim Memorial Foundation Fellowship in the field of biography
- 2014 Los Angeles Times Book Award, finalist in the biography category, for American Mirror
- 2014 PEN/Jacqueline Bograd Weld Award for Biography, shortlisted for American Mirror
- 2018 Commencement speaker at the New York Academy of Art; earned an honorary doctorate in fine arts.
- 2025 Named a 2025-2026 Fellow at the Leon Levy Center for Biography, at the Graduate Center of the City University of New York.
