= I Am More Than a Wolf Whistle =

Memoir by Carolyn Bryant Donham

- Author: Carolyn Bryant Donham; Marsha Bryant
- Language: English
- Subject: Lynching of Emmett Till
- Genre: Memoir
- Publication date: July 2022 (leaked)
- Publication place: United States
- Pages: 99

I Am More than a Wolf Whistle: The Story of Carolyn Bryant Donham is a memoir by Carolyn Bryant Donham, the white woman who accused Emmett Till, a 14-year-old African American boy, of grabbing her and making sexual advances at a Mississippi store in 1955, which resulted in Till's lynching at the hands of Donham's husband and brother-in-law.

The first-third of the memoir focuses on Donham's early life in the South, in which Donham recalls growing up on the Archer Plantation outside of Cruger, Mississippi and a relationship with her boyfriend. The last two-thirds of the book focuses on the events surrounding Till's interaction with Donham, his kidnapping and death, and the aftermath of the events. It concludes with Donham's statement where she considers herself a victim alongside Till.

The existence of I Am More than a Wolf Whistle was first revealed when historian Timothy Tyson interviewed Donham in 2008. Donham gave a manuscript copy of the memoir to Tyson, making an agreement that the book would not be released until 2036. The print was given to the Southern Historical Collection at the University of North Carolina. Till's cousin and civil rights activist Deborah Watts called for the manuscript to be released in 2021.

In July 2022, an unserved arrest warrant was discovered by the Emmett Till Legacy Foundation in a Mississippi County Courthouse basement, which led to Tyson releasing her copy of I Am More than a Wolf Whistle to the Federal Bureau of Investigation (FBI) and newspaper outlets. The book received an overwhelmingly negative response from historians, writers, and critics, who noted Donham's lack of contribution, historical revisionism, and its use of offensive racial tropes. Shortly after the memoir was leaked, an attempt was made to indict Donham on charges of kidnapping and manslaughter, which was declined. She died on April 25, 2023, at 88 years old.

== Background ==
Emmett Till, a 14-year-old African American resident of Chicago, visited relatives in Mississippi during the summer of 1955. On August 24, he visited a grocery store in Money, Mississippi called Bryant's Grocery, which was owned by Donham and her husband Roy Bryant, both of whom were white. Till allegedly interacted with Donham in some way, though accounts of the events differ. Four days later, after hearing about the interaction, Donham's husband Roy and Roy's half-brother John William "J. W." Milam kidnapped, tortured, and lynched Till. Given the limited scope of the civil rights statutes in effect at the time, the Federal Bureau of Investigation (FBI) did not investigate Till's murder immediately. However, Mississippi state authorities arrested Roy Bryant and Milam, who were indicted for murder and quickly acquitted by a local, all-white jury.

== Writing and release ==
The memoir was written by Carolyn Bryant Donham (pictured in 1955), who accused Till of making sexual advances.

I Am More than a Wolf Whistle was dictated by Donham to her daughter-in-law Marsha Bryant, who transcribed the recollections. The manuscript is also dedicated to Marsha. The public first learned of the book when historian Timothy Tyson interviewed Donham in 2008. Donham made an agreement with Tyson during the interview process that the book would not be released until 2036. She gave a copy of I Am More than a Wolf Whistle to Tyson, who in turn gave it to the Southern Historical Collection at the University of North Carolina, where it was held in their archives. Till's cousin and civil rights activist Deborah Watts called for the release of the manuscript in 2021 in an op-ed for USA Today, hoping its release would lead to Donham's indictment.

In July 2022, an unserved arrest warrant for Donham was found by the Emmett Till Legacy Foundation in a Mississippi County Courthouse basement. The discovery led to renewed calls for her arrest, which gained traction and coverage. Tyson released a copy of the manuscript to the FBI and subsequently to newspaper outlets, saying "The potential for an investigation was more important than the archival agreements, though those are important things. But this is probably the last chance for an indictment in this case." After the release of the manuscript, Tyson said he has not spoken to Donham since the interview in 2008. Donham was 88 years old at the time of the book's release. Journalist Stacey Patton from NewsOne, a division of Urban One, first broke the story of the manuscript, which quickly spread; PDFs were subsequently posted online.

== Content ==
The 99-page manuscript of I Am More than a Wolf Whistle focuses on two main aspects of Donham's life. The first third of the book focuses on her early life in the South, including her childhood being raised on the Archer Plantation outside of Cruger, Mississippi. Donham recalls her "hired help" Annie Freeman, whom she said she loved, recounting Freeman had skin "the color of hot chocolate". The recollections continue with Donham's boyfriend at the time showing her a "hanging tree", which Donham remembered would be a "terrific tree to climb" if she were a tomboy. The last two-thirds of the book focus on the interaction, aftermath, trial, and subsequent developments of the Till events. I Am More than a Wolf Whistle concludes with her statement that she considered herself a victim alongside Till. She claimed that he touched her without provocation but emphasized that she did not believe he should have been killed for doing so. Donham said that both she and Till paid "a price for it", describing Till's death as "the loss [of] his life" while her own life had been altered.

== Reception and response ==
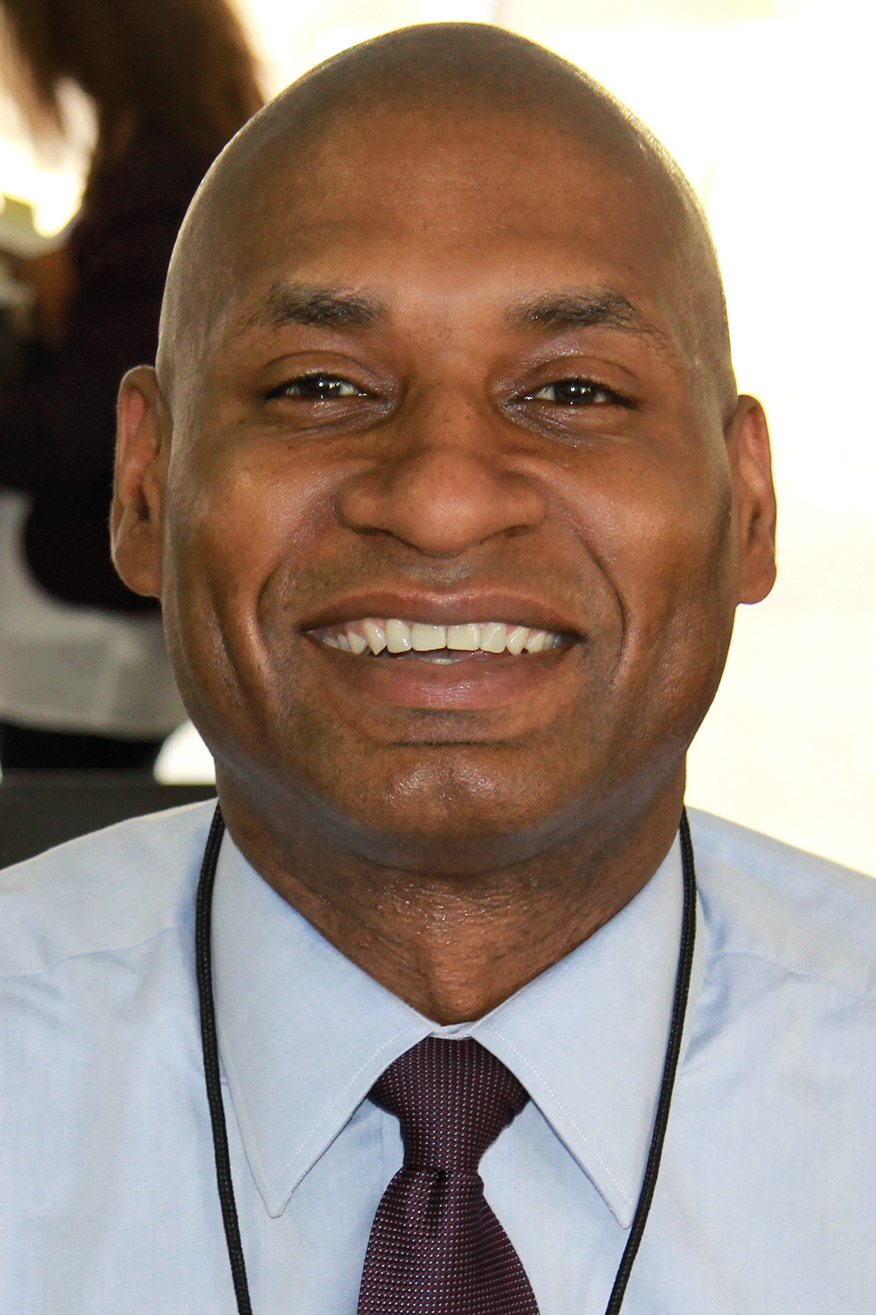
The New York Times writer Charles M. Blow criticized the memoir for its lack of redeeming nature from Donham.

I Am More than a Wolf Whistle received an overwhelmingly negative response, with a number of writers and historians noting the inconsistencies, historical revisionism, and lack of contrition by Donham. Jerry Mitchell from the Mississippi Center for Investigative Reporting noted a number of inconsistencies in the book, writing in his article for The Boston Globe that Donham's claims contradicted earlier statements she had made, as well as those of other witnesses. He also stated that Donham "conjures the 'black beast rapist' mythology" in describing the 14-year-old Till as a "man" who appeared in his "late teens or early 20s".

Natasha Decker from MadameNoire considered I Am More than a Wolf Whistle to contain "shocking new information... but not one of thorough confession, self-accountability, or guilt." Author and historian Chris Benson, who co-wrote the book A Few Days Full of Trouble on Till's lynching, said Donham's book has "several key contradictions" and the public will likely be "outraged" by her unrepentance. NewsOne's Patton described Donham as 'racist' and characterized the book as a hagiography attempt by avoiding responsibility for Till's lynching. Patton also criticized the book's portrayal of Black people, particularly Black children, in which she described as relying on offensive racial tropes.

Filmmaker Keith Beauchamp, director of the documentary The Untold Story of Emmett Louis Till (2005), said he was "totally disturbed and outraged" by what he read, arguing that I Am More than a Wolf Whistle provided further evidence of what he described as Donham's culpability in Till's kidnapping and murder. Online magazine Bossip wrote the book was a "malevolent manifesto" and called for Donham to be jailed. Journalist Charles M. Blow wrote an op-ed for the New York Times in which he lambasted Donham and the memoir, writing, "She has failed at every turn to offer a redeeming word or action for the boy's murder and her part in it. The words we've seen in this memoir don't cut it."

== Aftermath ==
Shortly after the memoir was leaked, an attempt was made to indict Donham on charges of kidnapping and manslaughter. On August 9, 2022, after hearing more than seven hours of testimony from investigators and witnesses, a grand jury in Mississippi declined to indict Donham, who died on April 25, 2023, at 88 years old.
