= Statue of Emmett Till =

Statue in Greenwood, Mississippi, U.S.

Coordinates: 33°31′00″N 90°10′55″W

- Artist: Matt Glenn
- Year: 2022
- Medium: Bronze, granite
- Subject: Emmett Till
- Dimensions: 2.7 m (9 ft); bronze statue: 7 feet (2.1 m), granite base: 2 feet (0.6 m)
- Location: Greenwood, Mississippi

A statue of Emmett Till was unveiled in Greenwood, Mississippi's Rail Spike Park in October 2022. State senator David Lee Jordan allocated $150,000 (equivalent to $178,221 in 2025) in state funding for the statue. As of October 2022, this is the only "stand-alone" statue of Till in the United States. There is another statue in Pueblo, Colorado that honors both Dr. Martin Luther King, Jr. and Till.

The Greenwood monument consists of a 7 feet (2.1 m) tall bronze statue of Till on a 2 feet (0.61 m) tall granite base. Till is touching the brim of his hat and wearing a dress shirt, slacks, and a necktie.

Shortly after installation, it was noted that the plaque on the statue contained errors, including using the word "Legislator" instead of "Legislature" and the sentence "After being falsely accused of whistling at and touching a white woman, Emmett was kidnapped and murdered on August 28, 1955." Most research and eyewitness accounts do not dispute Till's whistling. As of July 2023, the plaque still contained errors.
