= Emmett Till =

American lynching victim (1941–1955)

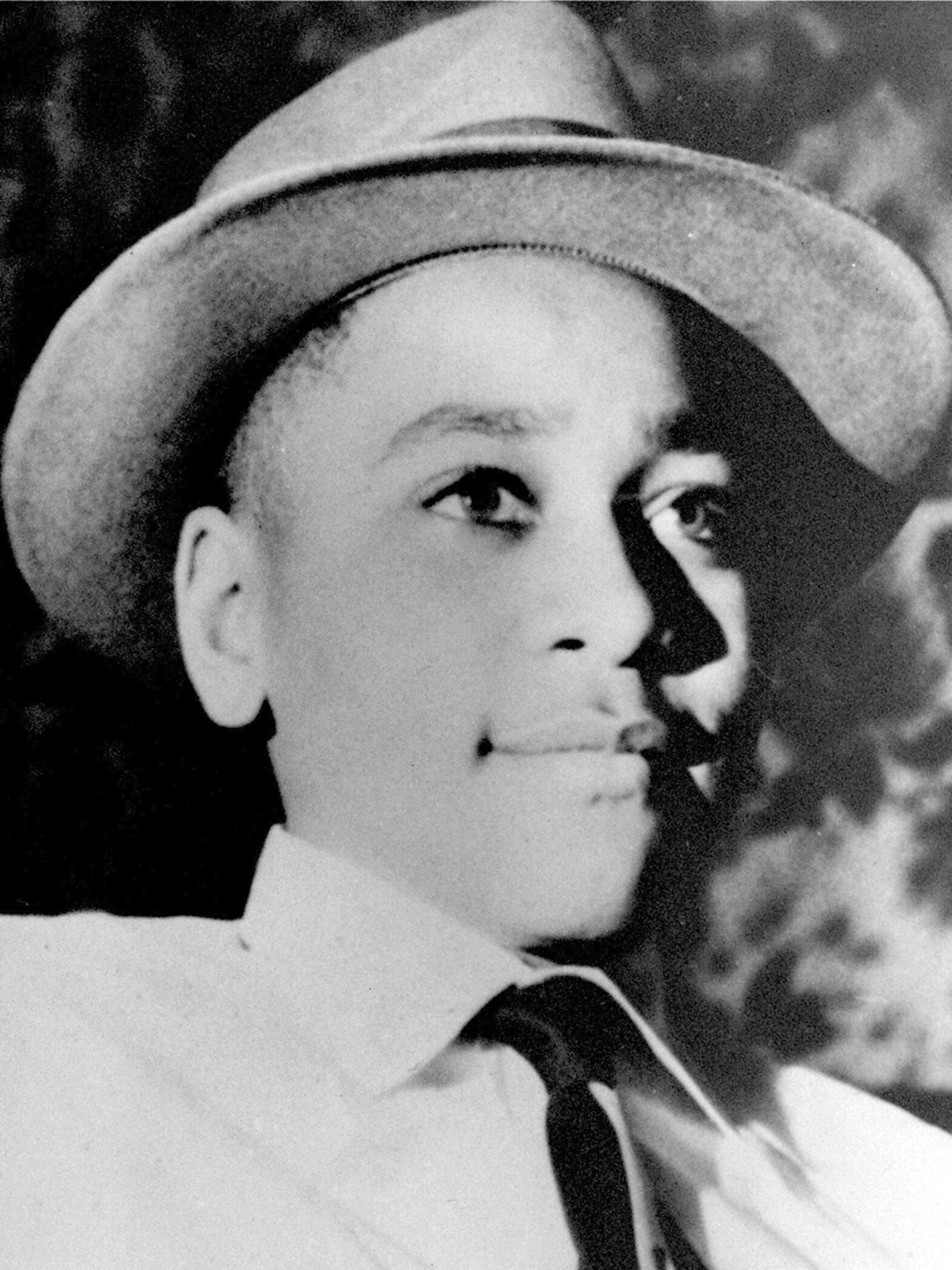
- Till in a photograph taken by his mother on Christmas Day, 1954
- Born: Emmett Louis Till; July 25, 1941; Chicago, Illinois, U.S.
- Died: August 28, 1955 (aged 14); Drew, Mississippi, U.S.
- Cause of death: Lynching (bullet wound and mutilation)
- Resting place: Burr Oak Cemetery
- Parents: Mamie Till-Mobley; Louis Till
- Awards: Congressional Gold Medal (posthumous, 2022)

Emmett Louis Till (July 25, 1941 – August 28, 1955) was an African-American boy who, at 14 years old, was abducted and lynched in Mississippi in 1955. The brutality of his murder and the acquittal of his killers drew attention to the long history of violent persecution of African Americans in the United States. Till posthumously became an icon of the civil rights movement.

Till was born and raised in Chicago, Illinois. During summer vacation in August 1955, he was visiting relatives near Money, Mississippi, in the Mississippi Delta region. Till spoke to 21-year-old Carolyn Bryant, the white, married proprietor of a local grocery store. Although what happened at the store is a matter of dispute, Till was accused of flirting with, touching, or whistling at Bryant. Till's interaction with Bryant, perhaps unwittingly, violated the unwritten code of behavior for a black male interacting with a white female in the Jim Crow–era South. Several nights after the encounter, Bryant's husband Roy and his half-brother J. W. Milam went to Till's great-uncle's house armed, and abducted Till, age 14. They beat and mutilated him before shooting him in the head and sinking his body in the Tallahatchie River. Three days later, Till's mutilated and bloated body was discovered and retrieved from the river.

Till's body was returned to Chicago, where his mother insisted on a public funeral service with an open casket, which was held at Roberts Temple Church of God in Christ. It was later said that "The open-coffin funeral held by Mamie Till Bradley (Note: At the time of Emmett's murder in 1955, Emmett's mother was often referred to as Mamie Till Bradley, using her second husband's surname. In 1957, she married Gene Mobley and then became known as Mamie Till Mobley.) exposed the world to more than her son Emmett Till's bloated, mutilated body. Her decision focused attention on not only American racism and the barbarism of lynching but also the limitations and vulnerabilities of American democracy." Tens of thousands attended his funeral or viewed his open casket, and images of Till's mutilated body were published in black-oriented magazines and newspapers, rallying black support and white sympathy across the United States. Intense scrutiny was brought to bear on the lack of black civil rights in Mississippi, with newspapers around the U.S. critical of the state. Although local newspapers and law enforcement officials initially decried the violence against Till and called for justice, they responded to national criticism by defending Mississippians, ultimately giving support to the killers.

In September 1955, an all-white jury acquitted Bryant and Milam of Till's murder. Protected against double jeopardy, the two men publicly admitted in a 1956 interview with Look magazine that they had tortured and murdered Till, selling the story for $4,000 (equivalent to $47,000 in 2025). Till's murder was seen as a catalyst for the next phase of the civil rights movement. In December 1955, the Montgomery bus boycott began in Alabama and lasted more than a year, resulting eventually in a U.S. Supreme Court ruling that segregated buses were unconstitutional.

According to historians, events surrounding Till's life and death continue to resonate. An Emmett Till Memorial Commission was established in 2006 by Tallahatchie County residents, and the county courthouse in Sumner was restored and includes the Emmett Till Interpretive Center. Fifty-one sites in the Mississippi Delta are memorialized as associated with Till. The Emmett Till Antilynching Act, an American law making lynching a federal hate crime, was signed into law on March 29, 2022, by President Joe Biden.

== Early childhood ==
Emmett Till was born to Mamie and Louis Till on July 25, 1941, in Chicago, Illinois. Emmett's mother, Mamie [née Carthan], was born in the small Delta town of Webb, Mississippi. The Delta region encompasses the large, multi-county area of northwestern Mississippi in the Yazoo and Mississippi river watersheds. When Carthan was two years old, her family moved to Argo, Illinois, near Chicago, as part of the Great Migration of rural black families out of the South to the North to escape violence, lack of opportunities, and unequal treatment under the law. Argo received so many Southern migrants that it was named "Little Mississippi"; Carthan's mother's home was often used by other recent migrants as a way station while they were trying to find jobs and housing.

Mississippi was the poorest state in the U.S. in the 1950s, and the Delta counties were some of the poorest in Mississippi. Mamie Carthan was born in Tallahatchie County, where the average income per white household in 1949 was $690 (equivalent to $9,300 in 2025). For black families, the figure was $462 (equivalent to $6,300 in 2025). In the rural areas, economic opportunities for blacks were almost nonexistent, and most worked as sharecroppers who lived on white-owned land. Blacks had essentially been disenfranchised and excluded from voting and the political system since 1890 when the white-dominated legislature passed a new constitution that raised barriers to voter registration. Whites had also passed ordinances establishing racial segregation and Jim Crow laws.

Mamie largely raised Emmett with her mother; she and Louis Till separated in 1942 after Mamie discovered that he had been unfaithful. Louis later assaulted Mamie, choking her to unconsciousness, to which she responded by throwing scalding water at him. For violating a restraining order to stay away from Mamie, Louis Till was forced by a judge in 1943 to choose between jail or enlisting in the U.S. Army. In 1945, a few weeks before his son's fourth birthday, Louis Till was court-martialed and executed in Italy for the murder of an Italian woman and the rape of two others.

At the age of six, Emmett contracted polio, which left him with a persistent stutter. Mamie and Emmett moved to Detroit, where she met and married "Pink" Bradley in 1951. Emmett preferred living in Chicago, so he returned there to live with his grandmother; his mother and stepfather rejoined him later that year. After the marriage dissolved in 1952, "Pink" Bradley returned alone to Detroit.

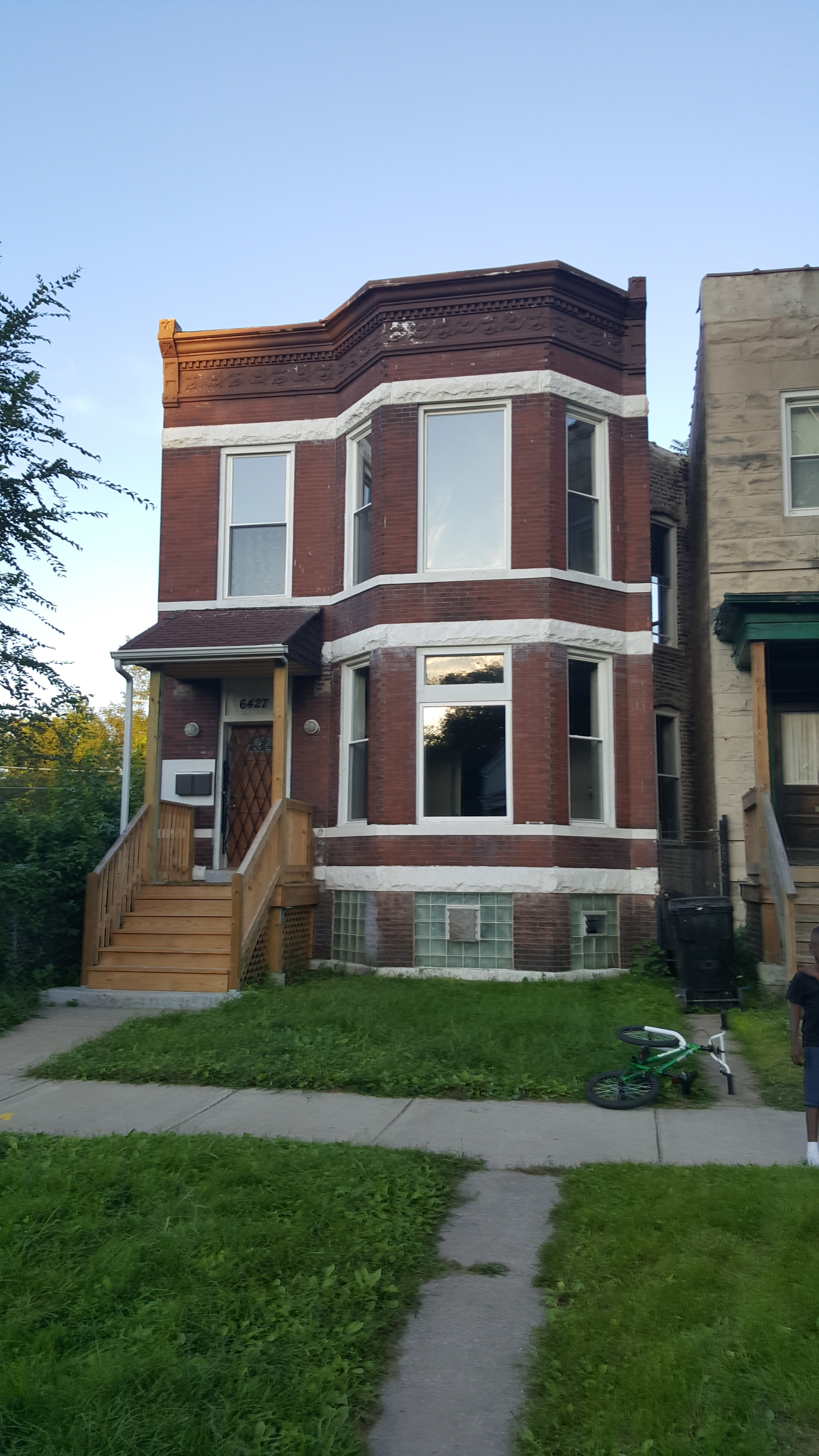
The Chicago two-flat at 6427 S. St. Lawrence Avenue where Emmett Till lived with his mother in mid-1955

Mamie Till-Bradley and Emmett lived together in a busy neighborhood in Chicago's South Side near distant relatives. She began working as a civilian clerk for the U.S. Air Force for a better salary. She recalled that Till was industrious enough to help with household chores, although he sometimes got distracted. Following the couple's separation, Bradley visited Mamie and began threatening her. At 11 years old, Till, with a butcher knife in hand, told Bradley he would kill him if the man did not leave. Till was typically happy, however. He and his cousins and friends pulled pranks on each other (Till once took advantage of an extended car ride when his friend fell asleep and placed the friend's underwear on his head), and they also spent their free time in pickup baseball games. Till was a smart dresser, and was often the center of attention among his peers.

=== Plans to visit relatives in Mississippi ===
In 1955, Mamie Till-Bradley's uncle, 64-year-old Mose Wright, visited her and Emmett in Chicago during the summer and told him stories about living in the Mississippi Delta. Emmett wanted to see for himself. Wright planned to accompany Till with a cousin, Wheeler Parker; another cousin, Curtis Jones, would join them soon after. Wright was a sharecropper and part-time minister who was often called "Preacher". He lived in Money, Mississippi, a small town in the Delta that consisted of three stores, a school, a post office, a cotton gin, and a few hundred residents, 8 miles (13 km) north of Greenwood. Before Till departed for the Delta, his mother cautioned him that Chicago and Mississippi were two different worlds, and he should know how to behave in front of white people in the South. Till assured her that he understood.

Statistics on lynchings began to be collected in 1882. Since that time, more than 500 African Americans have been killed by extrajudicial violence in Mississippi alone, with more than 3,000 across the South. Most of the incidents took place between 1876 and 1930; though far less common by the mid-1950s, these racially motivated murders still occurred. Throughout the South, interracial relationships were prohibited as a means to maintain white supremacy. Even the suggestion of sexual contact between black men and white women could carry severe penalties for black men. A resurgence of the enforcement of such Jim Crow laws was evident following World War II, when African-American veterans started pressing for equal rights in the South.

Racial tensions increased after the Supreme Court's 1954 decision in Brown v. Board of Education to end segregation in public education, which it ruled unconstitutional. Many segregationists believed the ruling would lead to interracial dating and marriage. Whites strongly resisted the court's ruling; one Virginia county closed all its public schools to prevent integration, while other jurisdictions simply ignored the ruling. In other ways, whites used stronger measures to keep blacks politically disenfranchised, which they had been since the turn of the century. Segregation in the South was used to constrain blacks forcefully from any semblance of social equality.

A week before Till arrived in Mississippi, a black activist named Lamar Smith was shot and killed in front of the county courthouse in Brookhaven for political organizing. Three white suspects were arrested, but they were soon released.

== Encounter between Till and Carolyn Bryant ==
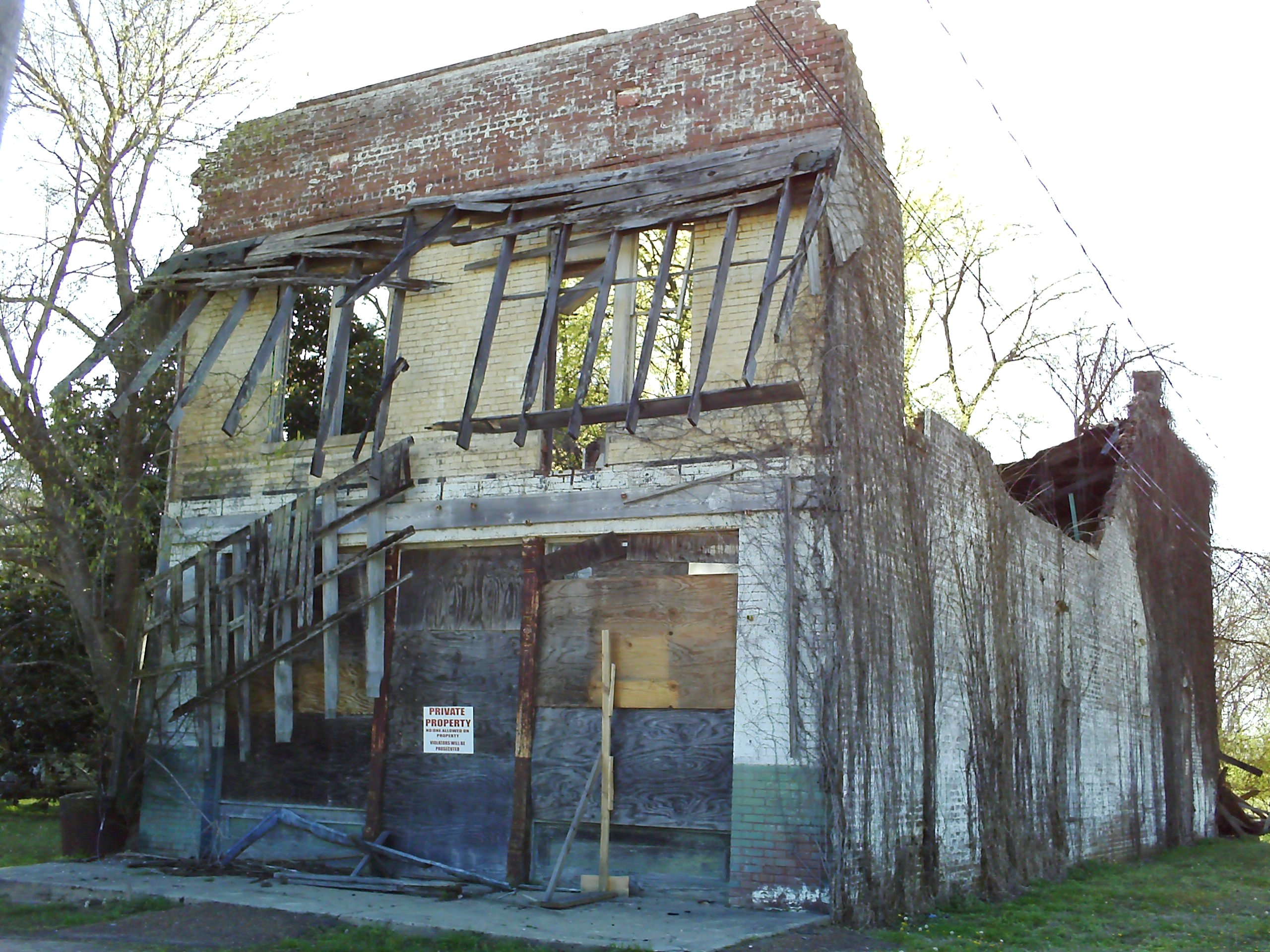
The remains of Bryant's Grocery and Meat Market in 2009

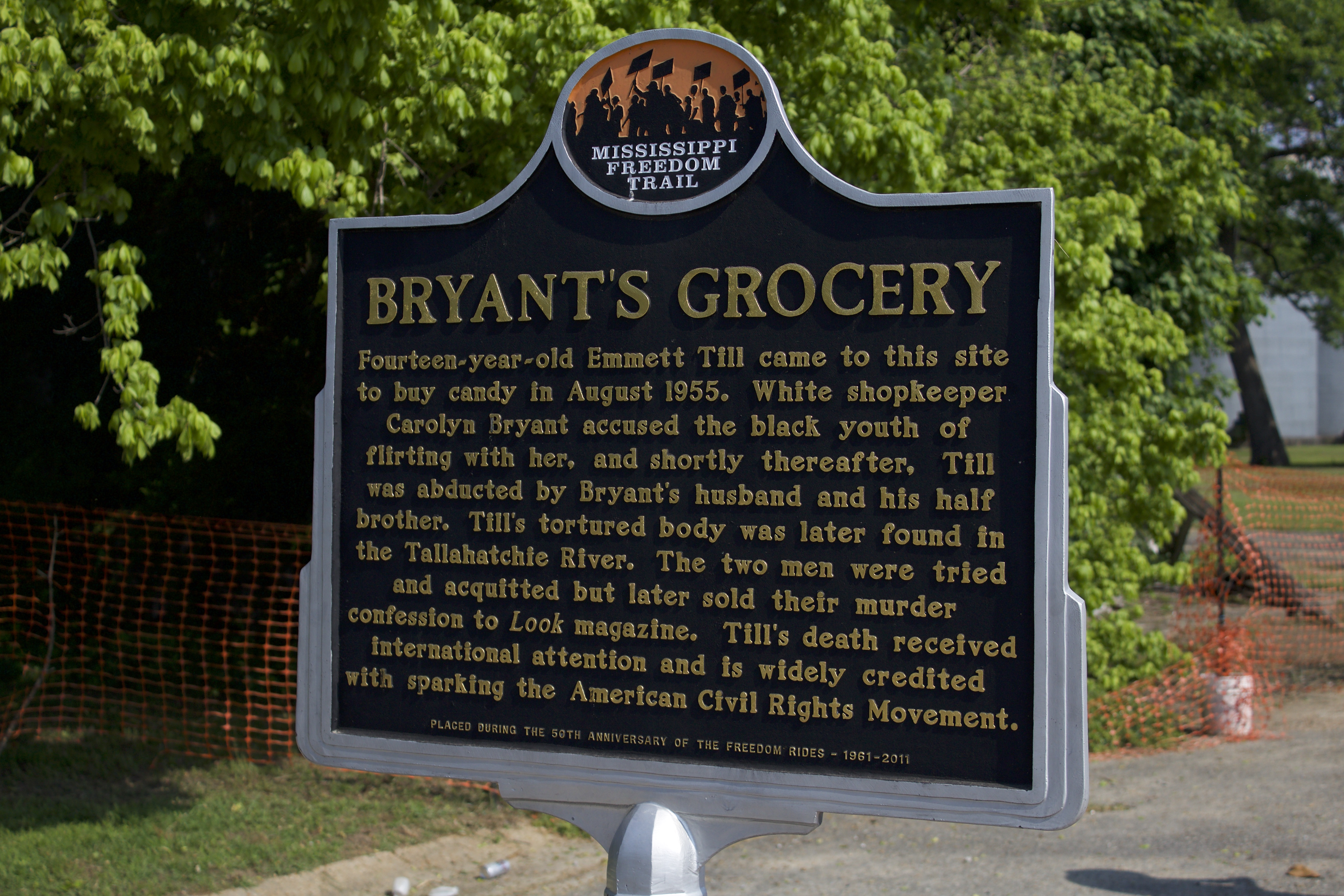
Bryant's Grocery Mississippi Freedom Trail Marker, 2018

Till arrived at the home of Mose and Elizabeth Wright in Money, Mississippi, on August 21, 1955. On the evening of August 24, Till and several young relatives and neighbors were driven by his cousin Maurice Wright to Bryant's Grocery and Meat Market to buy candy. Till's companions were children of sharecroppers and had been picking cotton all day. The market mostly served the local sharecropper population and was owned by a white couple, 24-year-old Roy Bryant and his 21-year-old wife Carolyn.

The facts of what took place in the store are still disputed. Journalist William Bradford Huie reported that Till showed the youths outside the store a photograph of a white girl in his wallet, and bragged that she was his girlfriend. Till's cousin Curtis Jones said the photograph was of an integrated class at the school Till attended in Chicago. (Note: Accounts are unclear; Till had just completed the seventh grade at the all-black McCosh Elementary School in Chicago. In 2018, a Chicago woman reported that she had been one of a small number of white students in Till's class. According to Mamie Till Mobley, Till had purchased a wallet which included a stock photo of actress Hedy Lamarr.) According to Huie and Jones, one or more of the local boys then dared Till to speak to Bryant. However, in his 2009 book, Till's cousin Simeon Wright, who was present, disputed the accounts of Huie and Jones. According to Wright, Till did not have a photo of a white girl, and nobody dared him to flirt with Bryant. Speaking in 2015, Wright said: "We didn't dare him to go to the store—the white folk said that. They said that he had pictures of his white girlfriend. There were no pictures. They never talked to me. They never interviewed me." The FBI report completed in 2006 notes: "[Curtis] Jones recanted his 1955 statements prior to his death and apologized to Mamie Till-Mobley". (Note: Simeon Wright, Mamie Till Mobley, Wheeler Parker, and historian Devery Anderson (2015) stated that Jones exaggerated his role as an eyewitness: he was in the Wright home the night Till was abducted, but had not yet arrived in Mississippi at the time of the store incident.)

According to both Simeon Wright and Wheeler Parker, Till wolf-whistled at Bryant. Wright said, "I think [Emmett] wanted to get a laugh out of us or something", adding, "He was always joking around, and it was hard to tell when he was serious." Wright stated that following the whistle, he became immediately alarmed. "Well, it scared us half to death", Wright recalled. "You know, we were almost in shock. We couldn't get out of there fast enough, because we had never heard of anything like that before. A black boy whistling at a white woman? In Mississippi? No." Wright stated "The Ku Klux Klan and night riders were part of our daily lives". Following his disappearance, a newspaper account stated that Till sometimes whistled to alleviate his stuttering. His speech was sometimes unclear; Mamie said he had particular difficulty with pronouncing "b" sounds, and he may have whistled to overcome problems asking for bubble gum. She said that, to help with his articulation, Mamie taught Till how to whistle softly to himself before pronouncing his words.

During the murder trial, (Note: During the trial, Carolyn Bryant's testimony was taken outside the presence of the jury and ruled inadmissible.) Bryant testified that Till grabbed her hand while she was stocking candy and said, "How about a date, baby?" Bryant said that after she freed herself from his grasp, Till followed her to the cash register, grabbed her waist and said, "What's the matter baby, can't you take it?" (Note: Notes later obtained from the defense give a different story, with Bryant earlier claiming she was "insulted" but not mentioning him touching her.) Bryant said she freed herself, and Till said, "You needn't be afraid of me, baby", used "one 'unprintable' word" and said "I've been with white women before." Bryant also alleged that one of Till's companions came into the store, grabbed him by the arm, and ordered him to leave.

Decades later, Simeon Wright also challenged the account given by Carolyn Bryant at the trial. Wright claims he entered the store "less than a minute" after Till was left inside alone with Bryant, and he saw no inappropriate behavior and heard "no lecherous conversation". Wright said Till "paid for his items and we left the store together." In their 2006 investigation of the cold case, the FBI noted that a second anonymous source, who was confirmed to have been in the store at the same time as Till and his cousin, supported Wright's account.

Author Devery Anderson writes that in an interview with the defense's attorneys, Bryant told a version of the initial encounter that included Till grabbing her hand and asking her for a date, but not Till approaching her and grabbing her waist, mentioning past relationships with white women, or having to be dragged unwillingly out of the store by another boy. Anderson further notes that many remarks prior to Till's kidnapping made by those involved indicate that it was his remarks to Bryant that angered his killers, rather than any alleged physical harassment. For instance, Mose Wright (a witness to the kidnapping) said that the kidnappers mentioned only "talk" at the store, and Sheriff George Smith only spoke of the arrested killers accusing Till of "ugly remarks". Anderson suggests that this evidence taken together implies that the more extreme details of Bryant's story were invented after the fact as part of the defense's legal strategy.

After Wright and Till left the store, Bryant went outside to retrieve a pistol from underneath the seat of a car. Till and his companions saw her do this and left immediately. It was acknowledged that Till whistled while Bryant was going to her car. However, one witness, Roosevelt Crawford, maintained that Till's whistle was directed not at Bryant, but at the checkers game that was taking place outside the store.

Carolyn's husband, Roy Bryant, was on an extended trip hauling shrimp to Texas and did not return home until August 27. Historian Timothy Tyson said an investigation by civil rights activists concluded Carolyn Bryant did not initially tell her husband Roy about the encounter with Till, and that Roy was told by a person who frequented their store. Roy was reportedly angry at his wife for not telling him. Carolyn Bryant told the FBI she did not tell her husband because she feared he would assault Till.

== Lynching ==
Lynching of Emmett Till
- Location of Drew within Sunflower County, Mississippi
- Location: Drew, Mississippi, U.S.
- Date: August 28, 1955
- Target: Emmett Louis Till
- Attack type: Lynching; kidnapping; hate crime; torture murder; child murder; shooting; mutilation; racial terrorism
- Victim: Emmett Louis Till
- Perpetrators: Roy Bryant and J. W. Milam
- Motive: Retaliation for allegedly offending a white woman, anti-black racism
- Accused: Carolyn Bryant (Note: Unserved arrest warrant, not formally charged)
- Charges: Roy Bryant and J. W. Milam: Murder
- Verdict: Roy Bryant and J. W. Milam: Not guilty (Note: Bryant and Milam admitted to the murder in an interview after their acquittal.)

After Roy Bryant was informed of what had happened, he aggressively questioned several young black men who entered the store. That evening, Bryant, with a black man named J. W. Washington, approached a black teenager walking alongside a road. Bryant ordered Washington to seize the boy, put him in the back of a pickup truck, and took him to be identified by a companion of Carolyn's who had witnessed the episode with Till. Friends or parents vouched for the boy in Bryant's store, and Carolyn's companion denied that the boy Bryant and Washington seized was the one who had accosted her. Somehow, Bryant learned that the boy in the incident was from Chicago and was staying with Mose Wright. (Note: Some recollections of this part of the story relate that news of the incident traveled in both black and white communities very quickly. Others say that Carolyn Bryant refused to tell her husband about it. According to some accounts, Till's eldest cousin Maurice Wright, perhaps put off by Till's bragging and smart clothes, told Roy Bryant at his store about Till's interaction with Bryant's wife.) Several witnesses overheard Bryant and his 36-year-old half-brother, John William "J. W." Milam, discussing taking Till from his house.

In the early morning hours of August 28, 1955, sometime between 2:00 and 3:30 a.m., Bryant and Milam drove to Mose Wright's house. Armed with a pistol and a flashlight, he asked Wright if he had three boys in the house from Chicago. At the time, Till was sharing a bed with another cousin and there were a total of eight people in the cabin. Milam asked Wright to take them to "the nigger who did the talking". Till's great-aunt offered the men money, but Milam refused as he rushed Emmett to put on his clothes. Mose Wright informed the men that Till was from up north and did not know any better. Milam reportedly then asked, "How old are you, preacher?" to which Wright responded, "sixty-four." Milam threatened that if Wright told anybody, he would not live to see sixty-five. The men marched Till out to the truck. Wright said he heard them ask someone in the car if this was the boy, and heard someone say "yes." When asked if the voice was that of a man or a woman Wright said that "it seemed like it was a lighter voice than a man's." In a 1956 interview with Look magazine, in which they confessed to the killing, Bryant and Milam said they would have brought Till by the store in order to have Carolyn identify him, but stated they did not do so because they said Till admitted to being the one who had talked to her.

Milam and Bryant tied up Till in the back of a green pickup truck and drove toward Money, Mississippi. According to some witnesses, they took Till back to Bryant's Groceries and recruited two black men. The men then drove to a barn in Drew, pistol-whipping Till on the way and reportedly knocked him unconscious. Willie Reed, who was 18 years old at the time, saw the truck passing by and later recalled seeing two white men in the front seat, and "two black males" in the back. Some have speculated that the two black men worked for Milam and were forced to help with the beating, although they later denied being present.

Willie Reed said that while walking home, he heard the beating and crying from the barn. Reed told a neighbor and they both walked back up the road to a well near the barn, where they were approached by Milam. Milam asked if they heard anything. Reed responded, "No." Others also passed by the shed and heard yelling. A local neighbor spotted "Too Tight" (Leroy Collins) at the back of the barn washing blood off the truck and noticed Till's boot. Upon questioning, Milam explained he had killed a deer and that the boot belonged to him.

Some have claimed that Till was shot and tossed over the Black Bayou Bridge in Glendora, Mississippi, near the Tallahatchie River. The group drove back to Roy Bryant's home in Money, where they reportedly burned Till's clothes.

Well, what else could we do? He was hopeless. I'm no bully; I never hurt a nigger in my life. I like niggers—in their place—I know how to work 'em. But I just decided it was time a few people got put on notice. As long as I live and can do anything about it, niggers are gonna stay in their place. Niggers ain't gonna vote where I live. If they did, they'd control the government. They ain't gonna go to school with my kids. And when a nigger gets close to mentioning sex with a white woman, he's tired o' livin'. I'm likely to kill him. Me and my folks fought for this country, and we got some rights. I stood there in that shed and listened to that nigger throw that poison at me, and I just made up my mind. 'Chicago boy,' I said, 'I'm tired of 'em sending your kind down here to stir up trouble. Goddam you, I'm going to make an example of you—just so everybody can know how me and my folks stand.'

— J. W. Milam, Look magazine, 1956

In an interview with William Bradford Huie that was published in Look magazine in 1956, Bryant and Milam said that they intended to beat Till and throw him off an embankment into the river to frighten him. They told Huie that while they were beating Till, he called them bastards, declared he was as good as they were and said that he had sexual encounters with white women. They put Till in the back of their truck, and drove to a cotton gin to take a 70-pound (32 kg) fan—the only time they admitted to being worried, thinking that by this time in early daylight they would be spotted and accused of theft—and drove for several miles along the river looking for a place to dispose of Till. They shot him by the river and weighted his body with the fan. (Note: Several major inconsistencies between what Bryant and Milam told interviewer William Bradford Huie and what they had told others were noted by the FBI in 2006. The pair of men told Huie they were sober, yet reported years later that they had been drinking. In the interview, they said they had driven what would have been 164 miles (264 km) looking for a place to dispose of Till's body, to the cotton gin to obtain the fan, and back again, which the FBI noted would have been impossible in the time available before they were seen to have returned. Several witnesses recalled that they saw Bryant, Milam, and two or more black men with Till's beaten body in the back of the pickup truck in Glendora, yet they did not tell Huie they were in Glendora. (FBI, [2006], pp. 86–96.))

Mose Wright stayed on his front porch for 20 minutes waiting for Till to return. He did not go back to bed. Wright and another man went into Money, got gasoline, and drove around unsuccessfully trying to find Till. They had returned home by 8:00 a.m. After hearing from Wright that he would not call the police because he feared for his life, Curtis Jones placed a call to the Leflore County sheriff, and another to his mother in Chicago. Distraught, she called Emmett's mother Mamie Till-Bradley. Wright and his wife Elizabeth drove to Sumner, where Elizabeth's brother contacted the sheriff.

Bryant and Milam were questioned by Leflore County sheriff George Smith. They admitted they had taken the boy from his great-uncle's yard, but claimed they had released him the same night in front of Bryant's store. Bryant and Milam were arrested for kidnapping. Word spread that Till was missing, and soon Medgar Evers, Mississippi state field secretary for the National Association for the Advancement of Colored People (NAACP), and Amzie Moore, head of the NAACP's Bolivar County chapter, became involved. They disguised themselves as cotton pickers and went into the cotton fields in search of any information that might help find Till.

Three days after his abduction and murder, Till's swollen and disfigured body was found by two boys who were fishing in the Tallahatchie River. His head was badly mutilated: he had been shot above the right ear, an eye was dislodged from the socket, there was evidence that he had been beaten on the back and hips, and his body was weighted by a fan blade fastened around his neck with barbed wire. Till was nude, but wearing his father's silver ring with the initials "L. T." and "May 25, 1943" carved in it. (Note: Many years later, there were allegations that Till had been castrated. (Mitchell, 2007) John Cothran, the deputy sheriff who was at the scene where Till was removed from the river testified, however, that apart from the decomposition typical of a body being submerged in water, his genitals had been intact. (FBI [2006]: Appendix Court transcript, p. 176.) Mamie Till-Mobley also confirmed this in her memoirs. (Till-Bradley and Benson, p. 135.)) His face was unrecognizable due to trauma and having been submerged in water. Mose Wright was called to the river to identify Till. The silver ring that Till was wearing was removed, returned to Wright, and passed on to the district attorney as evidence.

== Funeral and reaction ==
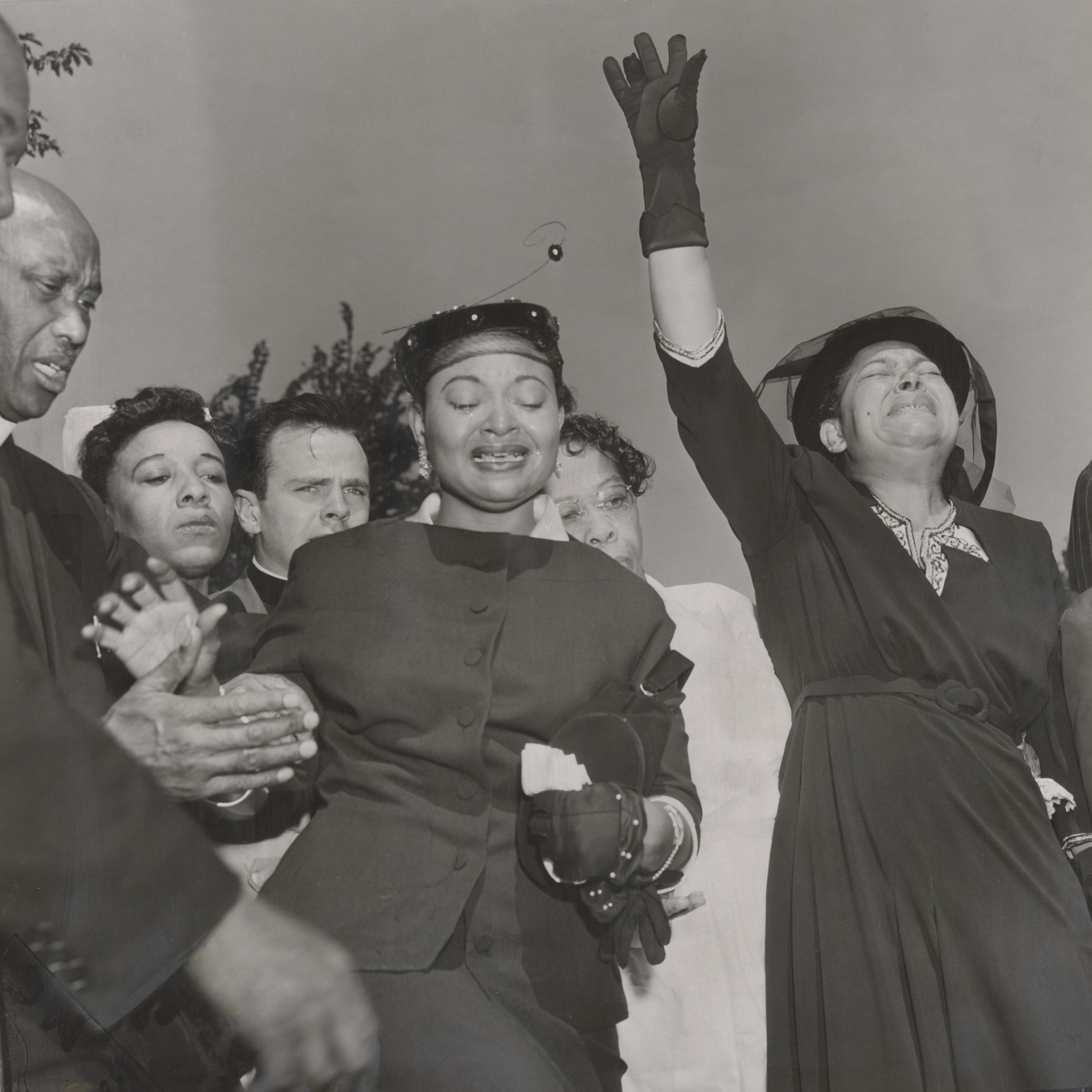
Mamie Till at Emmett's funeral

Although lynchings and racially motivated murders had occurred throughout the South for decades, the circumstances surrounding Till's murder and the timing acted as a catalyst to attract national attention to the case of a 14-year-old boy who had allegedly been killed for breaching a social caste system. Till's murder aroused feelings about segregation, law enforcement, relations between the North and South, the social status quo in Mississippi, the activities of the NAACP and the White Citizens' Councils, and the Cold War, all of which were played out in a drama staged in newspapers all over the U.S. and internationally.

After Till went missing, a three-paragraph story was printed in The Greenwood Commonwealth and was quickly picked up by other Mississippi newspapers. They reported on his death when the body was found. The next day, when a picture of him his mother had taken the previous Christmas showing them smiling together appeared in the Jackson Daily News and Vicksburg Evening Post, editorials and letters to the editor were printed expressing shame at the people who had caused Till's death. One read, "Now is the time for every citizen who loves the state of Mississippi to 'Stand up and be counted' before hoodlum white trash brings us to destruction." The letter said that Negroes were not the downfall of Mississippi society, but whites like those in White Citizens' Councils that condoned violence.

Till's body was clothed, packed in lime, placed into a pine coffin, and prepared for burial. It may have been embalmed while in Mississippi. Mamie Till-Bradley demanded that the body be sent to Chicago; she later said that she worked to halt an immediate burial in Mississippi and called several local and state authorities in Illinois and Mississippi to make sure that her son was returned to Chicago. A doctor did not examine Till postmortem.

Mississippi's governor, Hugh L. White, denounced the murder, asserting that local authorities should pursue a "vigorous prosecution". He sent a telegram to the national offices of the NAACP, promising a full investigation and assuring them "Mississippi does not condone such conduct." Delta residents, both black and white, also distanced themselves from Till's murder, finding the circumstances abhorrent. Local newspaper editorials denounced the murderers without question. Leflore County Deputy Sheriff John Cothran stated, "The white people around here feel pretty mad about the way that poor little boy was treated, and they won't stand for this."

However, discourse about Till's murder soon became more complex. Robert B. Patterson, executive secretary of the segregationist White Citizens' Council, used Till's death to claim that racial segregation policies were to provide for blacks' safety and that their efforts were being neutralized by the NAACP. In response, NAACP executive secretary Roy Wilkins characterized the incident as a lynching and said that Mississippi was trying to maintain white supremacy through murder. He said, "there is in the entire state no restraining influence of decency, not in the state capital, among the daily newspapers, the clergy, nor any segment of the so-called better citizens." Mamie Till-Bradley told a reporter that she would seek legal aid to help law enforcement find her son's killers and that the State of Mississippi should share the financial responsibility. She was misquoted; it was reported as "Mississippi is going to pay for this."

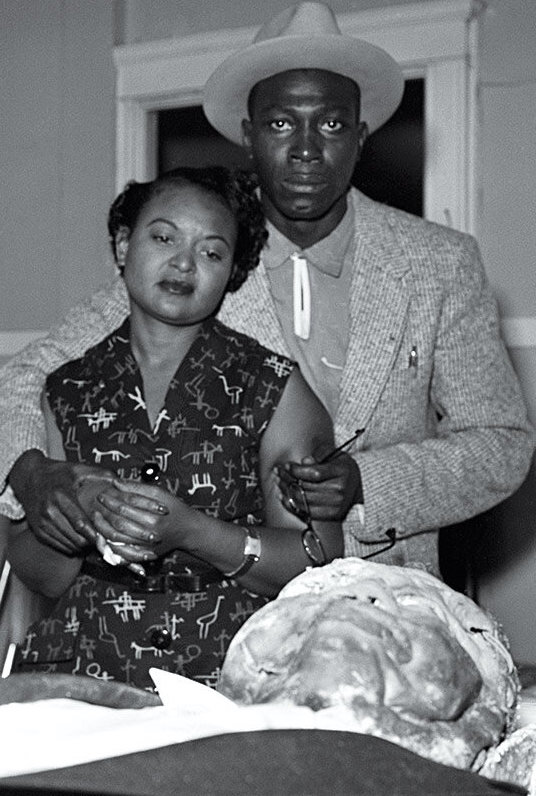
Till's mother looks over his mutilated corpse. With her is her fiancé Gene Mobley. Mamie Till had insisted on an open-casket funeral. Images of Till's body, printed in The Chicago Defender and Jet magazine, made international news and directed attention to the oppression of blacks in the U.S. South.

The A. A. Rayner Funeral Home in Chicago received Till's body. Upon arrival, Bradley insisted on viewing it to make a positive identification, later stating that the stench from it was noticeable two blocks away. She decided to have an open-casket funeral, saying: "There was just no way I could describe what was in that box. No way. And I just wanted the world to see." Tens of thousands of people lined the street outside the mortuary to view Till's body, and days later thousands more attended his funeral at Roberts Temple Church of God in Christ.

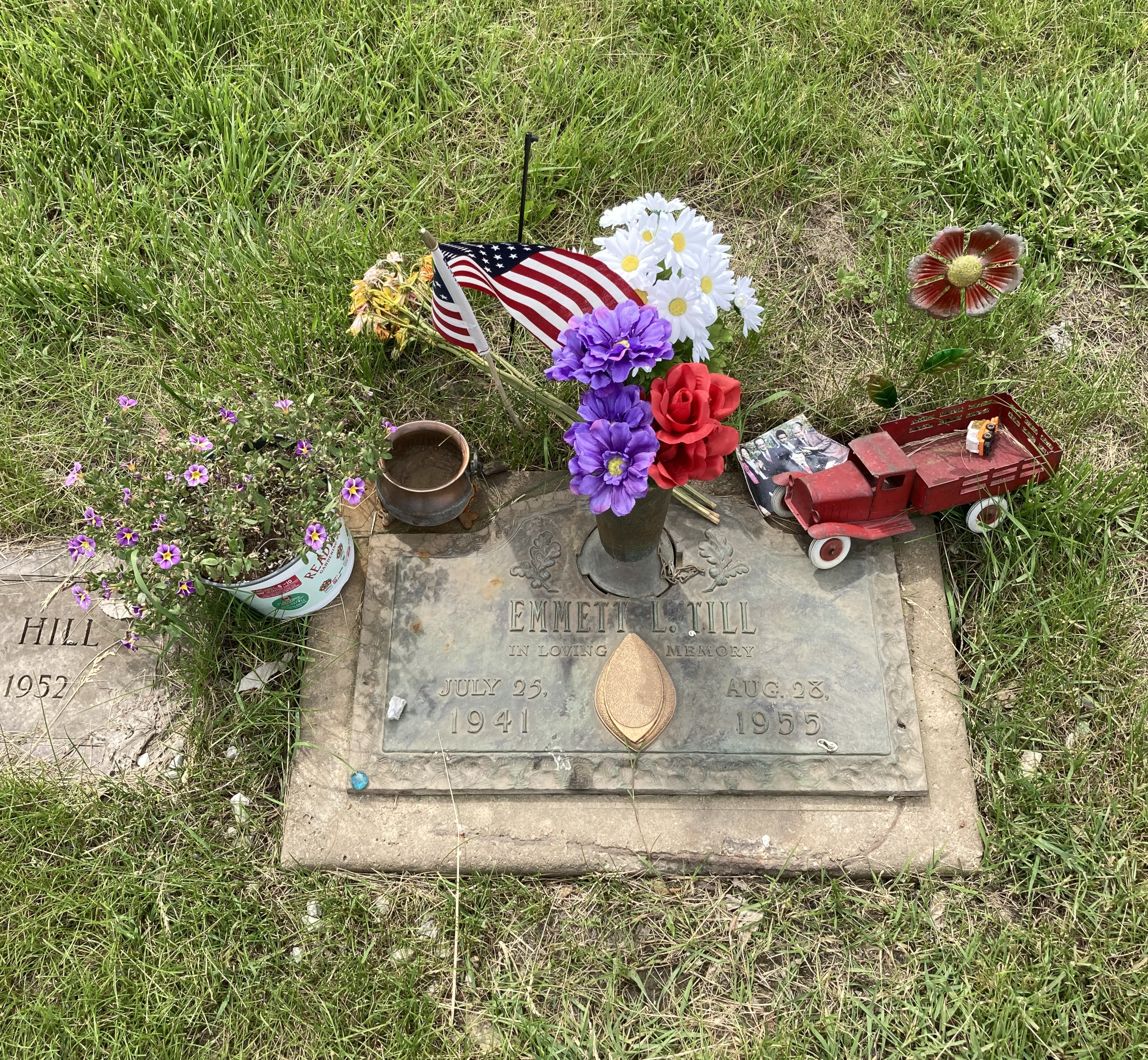
Till's grave at Burr Oak Cemetery

Photographs of Till's mutilated corpse circulated around the country, notably appearing in Jet magazine and The Chicago Defender, both black publications, generating intense public reaction. According to The Nation and Newsweek, Chicago's black community was "aroused as it has not been over any similar act in recent history". (Note: When Jet publisher John H. Johnson died in 2005, people who remembered his career considered his decision to publish Till's open-casket photograph his greatest moment. Michigan congressman Charles Diggs recalled that for the emotion the image stimulated, it was "probably one of the greatest media products in the last 40 or 50 years". (Dewan, 2005)) Time later selected one of the Jet photographs showing Mamie Till over the mutilated body of her dead son, as one of the 100 "most influential images of all time": "For almost a century, African Americans were lynched with regularity and impunity. Now, thanks to a mother's determination to expose the barbarousness of the crime, the public could no longer pretend to ignore what they couldn't see." On September 6, Till was buried at Burr Oak Cemetery in Alsip, Illinois.

News about Emmett Till spread to both coasts. Chicago Mayor Richard J. Daley and Illinois Governor William Stratton also became involved, urging Mississippi Governor White to see that justice was done. The tone in Mississippi newspapers changed dramatically. They falsely reported riots in the funeral home in Chicago. Bryant and Milam appeared in photos smiling and wearing military uniforms, and Carolyn Bryant's beauty and virtue were extolled. Rumors of an invasion of outraged blacks and northern whites were printed throughout the state, and were taken seriously by the Leflore County Sheriff. T. R. M. Howard, a local businessman, surgeon, and civil rights proponent and one of the wealthiest black people in the state, warned of a "second civil war" if "slaughtering of Negroes" were allowed.

Following Roy Wilkins' comments, white opinion began to shift. According to historian Stephen J. Whitfield, a specific brand of xenophobia in the South was particularly strong in Mississippi. Whites were urged to reject the influence of Northern opinion and agitation. This independent attitude was profound enough in Tallahatchie County that it earned the nickname "The Freestate of Tallahatchie", according to a former sheriff, "because people here do what they damn well please", making the county often difficult to govern.

Tallahatchie County Sheriff Clarence Strider, who initially positively identified Till's body and stated that the case against Milam and Bryant was "pretty good", on September 3 announced his doubts that the body pulled from the Tallahatchie River was that of Till. He speculated that the boy was probably still alive. Strider suggested that the recovered body had been planted by the NAACP: a corpse stolen by T. R. M. Howard, who colluded to place Till's ring on it. Strider changed his account after comments were published in the press denigrating the people of Mississippi, later saying: "The last thing I wanted to do was to defend those peckerwoods. But I just had no choice about it." (Note: Following the trial, Strider told a television reporter that should anyone who had sent him hate mail arrive in Mississippi, "the same thing's gonna happen to them that happened to Emmett Till".)

Bryant and Milam were indicted for murder. The state's prosecuting attorney, Hamilton Caldwell, was not confident that he could get a conviction in a case of white violence against a black male accused of insulting a white woman. A local black paper was surprised at the indictment and praised the decision, as did The New York Times. The high-profile comments published in Northern newspapers and by the NAACP were of concern to the prosecuting attorney, Gerald Chatham; he worried that his office would not be able to secure a guilty verdict, despite the compelling evidence. Having limited funds, Bryant and Milam initially had difficulty finding attorneys to represent them, but five attorneys at a Sumner law firm offered their services pro bono. Their supporters placed collection jars in stores and other public places in the Delta to raise money, eventually gathering $10,000 for their legal defense (equivalent to $120,000 in 2025).

== Trial ==
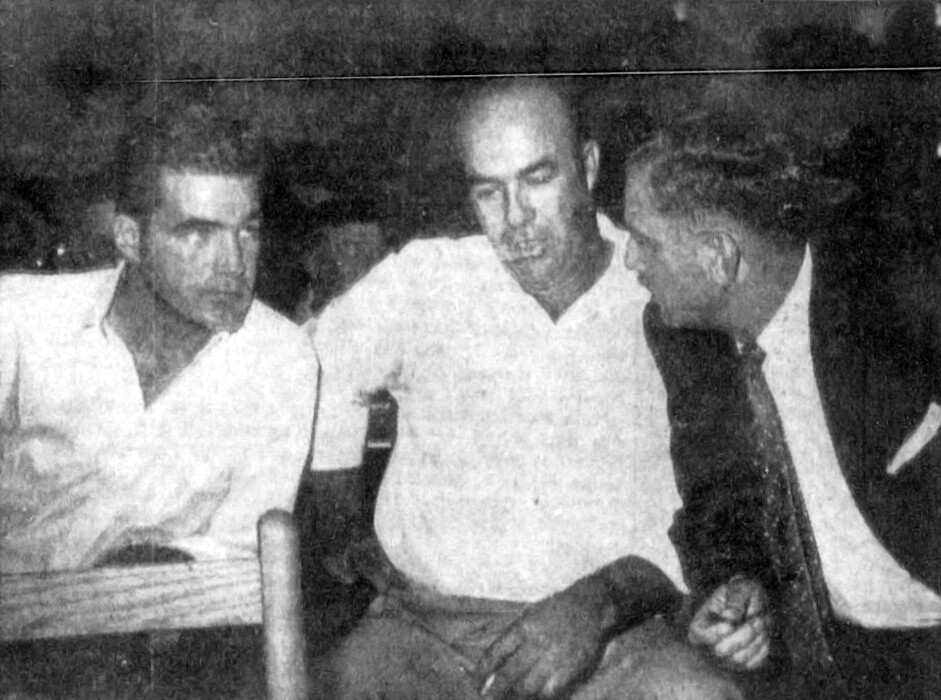
Bryant (left) and Milam (center) conferring with their attorney

The trial was held in the Tallahatchie County Courthouse in Sumner, the western seat of Tallahatchie County, because Till's body was found in this area. Sumner had one boarding house; the small town was besieged by reporters from all over the country. David Halberstam called the trial "the first great media event of the civil rights movement". A reporter who had covered the trials of Bruno Hauptmann and Machine Gun Kelly remarked that this was the most publicity for any trial he had ever seen. No hotels were open to black visitors. Mamie Till-Bradley arrived to testify, and the trial also attracted black Michigan congressman Charles Diggs. Bradley, Diggs, and several black reporters stayed at T. R. M. Howard's home in Mound Bayou.

The day before the start of the trial, a young black man named Frank Young arrived to tell Howard that he knew of two witnesses to the crime. Levi "Too Tight" Collins and Henry Lee Loggins were black employees of Leslie Milam, J. W.'s brother, in whose shed Till was beaten. Collins and Loggins were spotted with J. W. Milam, Bryant, and Till. The prosecution team was unaware of Collins and Loggins. Sheriff Strider, however, booked them into the Charleston, Mississippi, jail to keep them from testifying.

The trial was held in September 1955 and lasted for five days. The courtroom was filled to capacity with 280 spectators; black attendees sat in segregated sections. Press from major national newspapers attended, including black publications; black reporters were required to sit in the segregated black section and away from the white press, farther from the jury. Sheriff Strider welcomed black spectators coming back from lunch with a cheerful, "Hello, niggers!" Some visitors from the North found the court to be run with surprising informality. Jury members were allowed to drink beer on duty, and many white male spectators wore handguns.

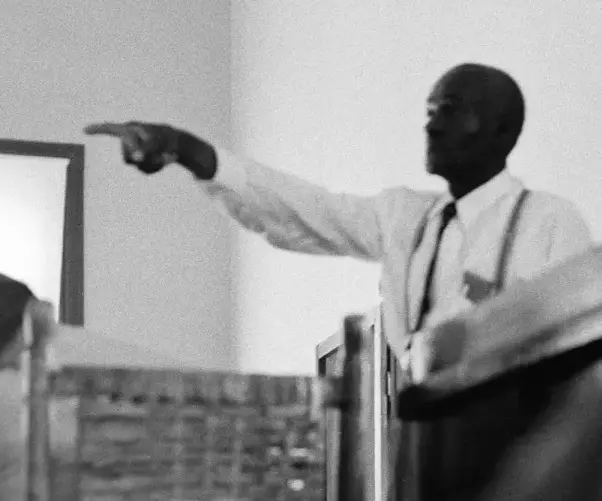
Till's uncle, Mose Wright, identifying J. W. Milam during Milam's trial, an act that "signified intimidation of Delta blacks was no longer as effective as [in] the past". Wright had "crossed a line that no one could remember a black man ever crossing in Mississippi". Photojournalist Ernest Withers defied the judge's orders banning photography during the trial to capture this shot.

The defense sought to cast doubt on the identity of the body pulled from the river. They said it could not be positively identified, and they questioned whether Till was dead at all. The defense also asserted that although Bryant and Milam had taken Till from his great-uncle's house, they had released him that night. The defense attorneys attempted to prove that Mose Wright—who was addressed as "Uncle Mose" by the prosecution and "Mose" by the defense—could not identify Bryant and Milam as the men who took Till from his cabin. They noted that only Milam's flashlight had been in use that night, and no other lights in the house were turned on. Milam and Bryant had identified themselves to Wright the evening they took Till; Wright said he had only seen Milam clearly. Wright's testimony was considered remarkably courageous. It may have been the first time in the South that a black man had testified to the guilt of a white man in court—and lived.

Journalist James Hicks, who worked for the black news wire service, the National Negro Publishers Association (later renamed the National Newspaper Publishers Association), was present in the courtroom; he was especially impressed that Wright stood to identify Milam, pointing to him and saying "There he is", (Note: The trial transcript says "There he is", although witnesses recall variations of "Dar he", "Thar he", or "Thar's the one". Wright's family protested that Mose Wright was made to sound illiterate by newspaper accounts and insisted he said "There he is." (Mitchell, 2007)) calling it a historic moment and one filled with "electricity". A writer for the New York Post noted that following his identification, Wright sat "with a lurch which told better than anything else the cost in strength to him of the thing he had done". A reporter who covered the trial for the New Orleans Times-Picayune said it was "the most dramatic thing I saw in my career".

Mamie Till-Bradley testified that she had instructed her son to watch his manners in Mississippi and that should a situation ever come to him being asked to get on his knees to ask forgiveness of a white person, he should do it without a thought. The defense questioned her identification of her son in the casket in Chicago and a $400 life insurance policy she had taken out on him (equivalent to $4,800 in 2025).

While the trial progressed, Leflore County Sheriff George Smith, Howard, and several reporters, both black and white, attempted to locate Collins and Loggins. They could not, but found three witnesses who had seen Collins and Loggins with Milam and Bryant on Leslie Milam's property. Two of them testified that they heard someone being beaten, blows, and cries. One testified so quietly the judge ordered him several times to speak louder; he said he heard the victim call out: "Mama, Lord have mercy. Lord have mercy." Sheriff Strider testified for the defense of his theory that Till was alive and that the body retrieved from the river was white. A doctor from Greenwood stated on the stand that the body was too decomposed to identify, and therefore had been in the water too long for it to be Till.

Carolyn Bryant was allowed to testify in court, but because Judge Curtis Swango ruled in favor of the prosecution's objection that her testimony was irrelevant to Till's abduction and murder, the jury was not present. In the event that the defendants were convicted, the defense wanted her testimony on record to aid in a possible appeal.

In the concluding statements, one prosecuting attorney said that what Till did was wrong, but that his action warranted a spanking, not murder. Gerald Chatham passionately called for justice and mocked the sheriff and doctor's statements that alluded to a conspiracy. Mamie Bradley indicated she was very impressed with his summation. The defense stated that the prosecution's theory of the events the night Till was murdered was improbable, and said the jury's "forefathers would turn over in their graves" if they convicted Bryant and Milam. Only three outcomes were possible in Mississippi for capital murder: life imprisonment, the death penalty, or acquittal. On September 23 the all-white, all-male jury (both women and blacks had been banned) acquitted both Milam and Bryant after a 67-minute deliberation; one juror said, "If we hadn't stopped to drink pop, it wouldn't have taken that long." (Note: Note: Blacks were generally excluded from juries because they were disenfranchised; jurors were drawn only from registered voters.)

In post-trial analyses, the blame for the outcome varied. Mamie Till-Bradley was criticized for not crying enough on the stand. The jury was noted to have been picked almost exclusively from the hill country section of Tallahatchie County, which, due to its poorer economic make-up, found whites and blacks competing for land and other agrarian opportunities. Unlike the population living closer to the river (and thus closer to Bryant and Milam in Leflore County), who possessed a noblesse oblige outlook toward blacks, according to historian Stephen Whitaker, those in the eastern part of the county were virulent in their racism. The prosecution was criticized for dismissing any potential juror who knew Milam or Bryant personally, for fear that such a juror would vote to acquit. In hindsight, this may have been a mistake, as most people who knew Milam and Bryant disliked them. One juror voted twice to convict, but on the third discussion, voted with the rest of the jury to acquit. In later interviews, the jurors acknowledged that they knew Bryant and Milam were guilty, but simply did not believe that life imprisonment or the death penalty were fit punishment for whites who had killed a black man. However, two jurors said as late as 2005 that they believed the defense's case. They also said that the prosecution had not proved that Till had died, nor that it was his body that was removed from the river.

In November 1955, a grand jury declined to indict Bryant and Milam for kidnapping, despite their own admissions of having taken Till. Mose Wright and a young man named Willie Reed, who testified to seeing Milam enter the shed from which screams and blows were heard, both testified in front of the grand jury. After the trial, T. R. M. Howard paid the costs of relocating to Chicago for Wright, Reed, and another black witness who testified against Milam and Bryant, in order to protect the three witnesses from reprisals for having testified. Reed, who later changed his name to Willie Louis to avoid being found, continued to live in the Chicago area until his death on July 18, 2013. He avoided publicity and even kept his history secret from his wife until she was told by a relative. Reed began to speak publicly about the case in the PBS documentary The Murder of Emmett Till, which was broadcast in 2003.

== Media discourse ==
Newspapers in major international cities, as well as religious and socialist publications, reported outrage about the verdict and strong criticism of American society, while Southern newspapers, particularly in Mississippi, wrote that the court system had done its job. Till's story continued to make the news for weeks following the trial, sparking debate in newspapers, among the NAACP and various high-profile segregationists about justice for blacks and the propriety of Jim Crow society.

In October 1955, the Jackson Daily News reported facts about Till's father that had been suppressed by the U.S. military. While serving in Italy, Louis Till was court-martialed for the rape of two women and the killing of a third. He was found guilty and executed by hanging by the Army near Pisa in July 1945. Mamie Till-Bradley and her family knew none of this, having been told only that Louis had been killed for "willful misconduct". Mississippi senators James Eastland and John C. Stennis probed Army records and revealed Louis Till's crimes. Although Emmett Till's murder trial was over, news about his father was carried on the front pages of Mississippi newspapers for weeks in October and November 1955. This renewed debate about Emmett Till's actions and Carolyn Bryant's integrity. Stephen Whitfield writes that the lack of attention paid to identifying or finding Till is "strange" compared to the amount of published discourse about his father. According to historians Davis Houck and Matthew Grindy, "Louis Till became a most important rhetorical pawn in the high-stakes game of north versus south, black versus white, NAACP versus White Citizens' Councils." In 2016, reviewing the facts of the rapes and murder for which Louis Till had been executed, John Edgar Wideman posited that, given the timing of the publicity about Emmett's father, although the defendants had already confessed to taking Emmett from his uncle's house, the post-murder trial grand jury refused to even indict them for kidnapping. Wideman also suggested that the conviction and punishment of Louis Till may have been racially motivated, referring to his trial as a "kangaroo court-martial".

If the facts as stated in the Look magazine account of the Till affair are correct, this remains: two adults, armed, in the dark, kidnap a fourteen-year-old boy and take him away to frighten him. Instead of which, the fourteen-year-old boy not only refuses to be frightened, but unarmed, alone, in the dark, so frightens the two armed adults that they must destroy him ... What are we Mississippians afraid of?

— William Faulkner, "On Fear", 1956

Protected against double jeopardy, Bryant and Milam struck a deal with Look magazine in 1956 to tell their story to journalist William Bradford Huie for between $3,600 and $4,000. The interview took place in the law firm of the attorneys who had defended Bryant and Milam. Huie did not ask the questions; Bryant and Milam's own attorneys did. Neither attorney had heard their clients' accounts of the murder before. According to Huie, the older Milam was more articulate and sure of himself than the younger Bryant. Milam admitted to shooting Till and neither of them believed they were guilty or that they had done anything wrong.

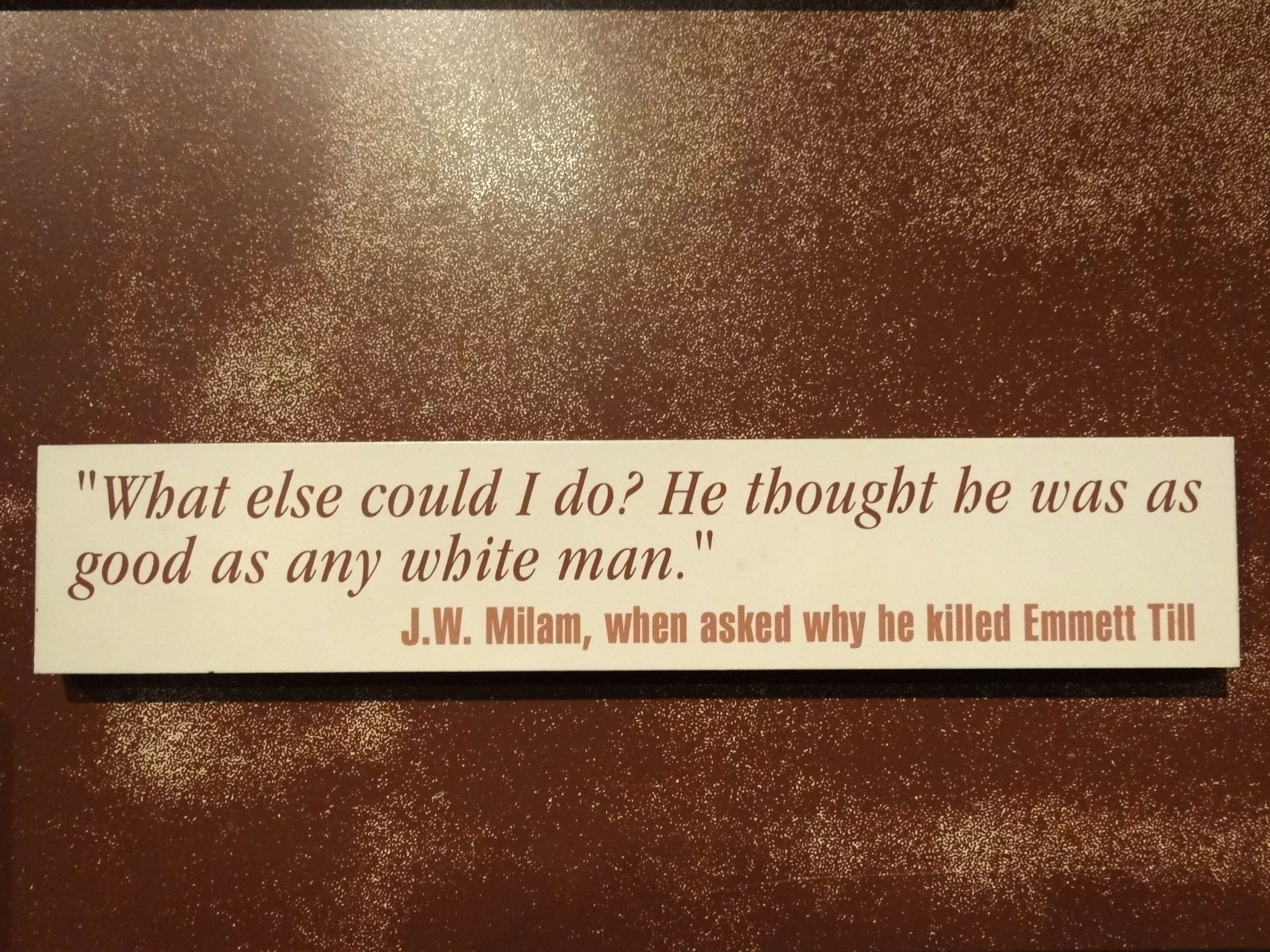
Quote from Milam on why he killed Till. Displayed at the National Civil Rights Museum, Memphis, Tennessee

Reaction to Huie's interview with Bryant and Milam was explosive. Their brazen admission that they had murdered Till caused prominent civil rights leaders to push the federal government harder to investigate the case. Till's murder contributed to congressional passage of the Civil Rights Act of 1957: it authorized the U.S. Department of Justice to intervene in local law enforcement issues when individual civil rights were being compromised. Huie's interview, in which Milam and Bryant said they had acted alone, overshadowed inconsistencies in earlier versions of the stories. As a consequence, details about others who had possibly been involved in Till's abduction and murder, or the subsequent cover-up, were forgotten, according to historians David and Linda Beito. (Note: A month after Huie's article appeared in Look, T. R. M. Howard worked with Olive Arnold Adams of The New York Age to publish a version of the events that agreed more with the testimony at the trial and what Howard had been told by Frank Young. It appeared as a booklet titled Time Bomb: Mississippi Exposed and the Full Story of Emmett Till. Howard also acted as a source for an as-yet-unidentified reporter using the pseudonym Amos Dixon in the California Eagle. Dixon wrote a series of articles implicating three black men, and Leslie Milam, whom he reported had participated in Till's murder in some way. Time Bomb and Dixon's articles had no lasting effect in the shaping of public opinion. Huie's article in the far more widely circulated Look became the most commonly accepted version of events.)

== Later events ==
Till's murder increased fears among the local black community that they would be subjected to violence and that the law would not protect them. According to Deloris Melton Gresham, whose father was killed a few months after Till, "At that time, they used to say that 'it's open season on n*****s.' Kill'em and get away with it."

After Bryant and Milam admitted to Huie that they had killed Till, the support base of the two men eroded in Mississippi. Many of their former friends and supporters, including those who had contributed to their defense funds, cut them off. Blacks boycotted their shops, which went bankrupt and closed, and banks refused to grant them loans to plant crops. After struggling to secure a loan and find someone who would rent to him, Milam managed to secure 217 acres (88 ha) and a $4,000 loan to plant cotton, but blacks refused to work for him. Milam was forced to pay whites higher wages.

Eventually, Milam and Bryant relocated to Texas, but they continued to generate animosity from locals. In 1961, while in Texas, when Bryant recognized the license plate of a Tallahatchie County resident, he called out a greeting and identified himself. The resident, upon hearing the name, drove away without speaking to Bryant. After several years, they returned to Mississippi. Milam found work as a heavy equipment operator, but ill health forced him into retirement. Over the years, Milam was tried for offenses including assault and battery, writing bad checks, and using a stolen credit card. He died of spinal cancer on December 31, 1980, at the age of 61.

Bryant worked as a welder while in Texas, until increasing blindness forced him to resign. At some point, he and Carolyn divorced; he remarried in 1980. Bryant opened a store in Ruleville, Mississippi. He was convicted in 1984 and 1988 of food stamp fraud. In a 1985 interview, Bryant denied killing Till despite having admitted to it in 1956, but said: "if Emmett Till hadn't got out of line, it probably wouldn't have happened to him." Fearing economic boycotts and retaliation, Bryant lived a private life and refused to be photographed or reveal the exact location of his store, explaining: "this new generation is different and I don't want to worry about a bullet some dark night". He died of cancer on September 1, 1994, at the age of 63.

Mamie Till married Gene Mobley, became a teacher, and changed her surname to Till-Mobley. She continued to educate people about her son's murder. In 1992, Till-Mobley had the opportunity to listen while Bryant was interviewed about his involvement in Till's murder. With Bryant unaware that Till-Mobley was listening, he asserted that Till had ruined his life, expressed no remorse, and said: "Emmett Till is dead. I don't know why he can't just stay dead."

In 1996, documentary filmmaker Keith Beauchamp, who was greatly moved by Till's open-casket photograph, started background research for a feature film he planned to make about Till's murder. He asserted that as many as 14 people may have been involved, including Carolyn Bryant Donham (who by this point had remarried). Beauchamp spent the next nine years producing The Untold Story of Emmett Louis Till, released in 2003.

That same year, PBS aired an installment of American Experience titled The Murder of Emmett Till. In 2005, CBS journalist Ed Bradley aired a 60 Minutes report investigating the Till murder, part of which showed him tracking down Carolyn Bryant at her home in Greenville, Mississippi.

A 1991 book written by Stephen J. Whitfield, another by Christopher Metress in 2002, and Mamie Till-Mobley's memoirs the next year all posed questions as to who was involved in the murder and cover-up. Federal authorities in the 21st century worked to resolve the questions about the identity of the body pulled from the Tallahatchie River.

In 2004, the U.S. Department of Justice (DOJ) announced that it was reopening the case to determine whether anyone other than Milam and Bryant was involved. David T. Beito, a University of Alabama professor, stated that Till's murder "has this mythic quality like the Kennedy assassination". The DOJ had undertaken to investigate numerous cold cases dating to the civil rights movement, in the hope of finding new evidence in other murders as well.

Till's body was exhumed, and the Cook County coroner conducted an autopsy in 2005. Using DNA from Till's relatives, dental comparisons to images taken of Till, and anthropological analysis, the exhumed body was positively identified as that of Till. It had extensive cranial damage, a broken left femur, and two broken wrists. Metallic fragments found in the skull were consistent with bullets being fired from a .45 caliber gun.

In February 2007, a Leflore County grand jury, composed primarily of black jurors and empaneled by Joyce Chiles, a black prosecutor, found no credible basis for Beauchamp's claim that 14 people took part in Till's abduction and murder. Beauchamp was angry with the finding. David Beito and Juan Williams, who worked on the reading materials for the Eyes on the Prize documentary, were critical of Beauchamp for trying to revise history and taking attention away from other cold cases. The grand jury failed to find sufficient cause for charges against Carolyn Bryant Donham. Neither the FBI nor the grand jury found any credible evidence that Henry Lee Loggins, identified by Beauchamp as a suspect who could be charged, had any role in the crime. Other than Loggins, Beauchamp refused to name any of the people he alleged were involved.

=== Historical markers ===
For 50 years nobody talked about Emmett Till. I think we just have to be resilient and know there are folks out there that don't want to know this history or who want to erase the history. We are just going to be resilient in continuing to put them back up and be truthful in making make sure that Emmett didn't die in vain.

— Patrick Weems, executive director of the Emmett Till Memorial Commission, speaking in October 2019 at the unveiling of a bulletproof historical marker (the previous three markers at the site having been shot up) near the Tallahatchie River.

The first highway marker remembering Emmett Till, erected in 2006, was defaced with "KKK", and then completely covered with black paint.

In 2007, eight markers were erected at sites associated with Till's lynching. The marker at the "River Spot" where Till's body was found was torn down in 2008, presumably thrown in the river. A replacement sign received more than 100 bullet holes over the next few years. A third replacement was installed in June 2018, and in July it was vandalized by bullets. The same month, three University of Mississippi students were suspended from their fraternity after posing in front of the bullet-riddled marker, with guns, and uploading the photo to Instagram. As stated by reporter Jerry Mitchell, "It is not clear whether the fraternity students shot the sign or are simply posing before it." In 2019, a fourth sign was erected. It is made of steel, weighs 500 pounds (230 kg), is over 1 inch (2.5 cm) thick, and is said by its manufacturer to be indestructible.

=== Claim that Carolyn Bryant recanted her testimony ===
In 2017, historian and author Timothy Tyson claimed that during a 2008 interview with him Carolyn Bryant retracted her testimony that Till had grabbed her around her waist and uttered obscenities. Bryant and her daughter-in-law, who were present during Tyson's interviews, disagreed, stating that she never recanted. The jury did not hear Bryant's testimony at the trial as the judge had ruled it inadmissible, but the court spectators heard. The defense wanted Bryant's testimony as evidence for a possible appeal in case of a conviction. Tyson also reported that Bryant said she could not remember the rest of the events that occurred between her and Till in the grocery store, but said that: "nothing that boy did could ever justify what happened to him."

An editorial in The New York Times said, regarding Bryant's alleged admission that portions of her testimony were false: "This admission is a reminder of how black lives were sacrificed to white lies in places like Mississippi. It also raises anew the question of why no one was brought to justice in the most notorious racially motivated murder of the 20th century, despite an extensive investigation by the F.B.I."

The New York Times quoted Wheeler Parker, a cousin of Till's, who said: "I was hoping that one day she [Bryant] would admit it, so it matters to me that she did, and it gives me some satisfaction. It's important to people understanding how the word of a white person against a black person was law, and a lot of black people lost their lives because of it. It really speaks to history, it shows what black people went through in those days."

The U.S. Department of Justice reopened the investigation into Till's death in 2017. Tyson's account of the alleged recantation wasn't considered credible by the DOJ due to numerous inconsistencies and financial motives and the investigation was closed in 2021 stating "There is insufficient evidence to prove that she ever told the professor that any part of her testimony was untrue".

=== Discovery of unserved arrest warrant ===
In June 2022, an arrest warrant for the kidnapping suspects, dated August 29, 1955, and signed by the Leflore County Clerk, was discovered in a courthouse basement by members of the Emmett Till Legacy Foundation. The warrant listed J W Milam, Roy Bryant and Mrs. Roy Bryant. Following the discovery, Till's family called for Carolyn Bryant's arrest (at that time she was remarried and known as Carolyn Donham). However, the district attorney declined to charge Donham, citing no new evidence to reopen the case. In August 2022, a grand jury ultimately concluded there was insufficient evidence to indict Donham.

In December 2022, the city of Bowling Green, Kentucky canceled its annual Christmas parade scheduled for December 3, 2022, due to threats of violence against groups who planned to protest outside Donham's home, an apartment at Shive Lane. The protests took place peacefully.

=== Carolyn Bryant Donham memoir ===
In 2022, I Am More Than a Wolf Whistle, the 99-page memoir of Carolyn Bryant Donham, was copied and given to NewsOne by an anonymous source. The text had been given to the University of North Carolina to hold privately until 2036.

The memoir had been prepared by Donham's daughter-in-law Marsha Bryant, who had shared the material with Timothy Tyson, with the understanding that Tyson would edit the memoir. However, Tyson said there had been no such agreement, and placed the memoir at the Southern Historical Collection at the University of North Carolina-Chapel Hill library archives, with access restricted for 20 years or until Donham's death.

Donham died on April 25, 2023, at the age of 88.

== Influence on civil rights ==
Till's case became emblematic of the injustices suffered by blacks in the South. Myrlie Evers, the widow of Medgar Evers, said years later that the case "struck a spark of indignation that ... touched off a world-wide clamor and cast the glare of a world spotlight on Mississippi's racism."

Mamie Till toured the country in one of the NAACP's most successful fundraising campaigns ever. Journalist Louis Lomax acknowledges Till's death to be the start of what he terms the "Negro revolt", and scholar Clenora Hudson-Weems characterizes Till as a "sacrificial lamb" for civil rights. NAACP operative Amzie Moore considers Till the start of the Civil Rights Movement, at the very least in Mississippi.

The 1987 Emmy award-winning documentary series Eyes on the Prize, begins with the murder of Emmett Till. Accompanying written materials for the series, Eyes on the Prize and Voices of Freedom (for the second time period), exhaustively explore the major figures and events of the Civil Rights Movement. Stephen Whitaker states that, as a result of the attention Till's death and the trial received,

Mississippi became in the eyes of the nation the epitome of racism and the citadel of white supremacy. From this time on, the slightest racial incident anywhere in the state was spotlighted and magnified. To the Negro race throughout the South and to some extent in other parts of the country, this verdict indicated an end to the system of noblesse oblige. The faith in the white power structure waned rapidly. Negro faith in legalism declined, and the revolt officially began on December 1, 1955, with the Montgomery, Alabama, bus boycott.

I thought of Emmett Till and I just couldn't go back.

— Rosa Parks, on her refusal to move to the back of the bus, launching the Montgomery bus boycott.

In Montgomery a few months after the murder, Rosa Parks attended a rally for Till, led by Martin Luther King Jr. Soon after, she was arrested for refusing to give up her seat on a segregated bus to a white passenger. The incident sparked a year-long well-organized grassroots boycott of the public bus system. The boycott was designed to force the city to change its segregation policies. Parks later said when she did not get up and move to the rear of the bus, "I thought of Emmett Till and I just couldn't go back."

According to author Clayborne Carson, Till's death and the widespread coverage of the students integrating Little Rock Central High School in 1957 were especially profound for younger blacks: "It was out of this festering discontent and an awareness of earlier isolated protests that the sit-ins of the 1960s were born." After seeing pictures of Till's mutilated body, in Louisville, Kentucky, young Cassius Clay (later famed boxer Muhammad Ali) and a friend took out their frustration by vandalizing a local railyard, causing a locomotive engine to derail.

In 1963, Sunflower County resident and sharecropper Fannie Lou Hamer was jailed and beaten for attempting to register to vote. The next year, she led a massive voter registration drive in the Delta region, and volunteers worked on Freedom Summer throughout the state. Before 1954, 265 black people were registered to vote in three Delta counties, where they were a majority of the population. At this time, blacks made up 41% of the total state population. The summer Emmett Till was killed, the number of registered voters in those three counties dropped to 90, and by the end of 1955, 14 Mississippi counties had no registered black voters. The Mississippi Freedom Summer of 1964 registered 63,000 black voters in a simplified process administered by the project; they formed their own political party because they were closed out of the Democratic Regulars in Mississippi.

== Legacy and honors ==
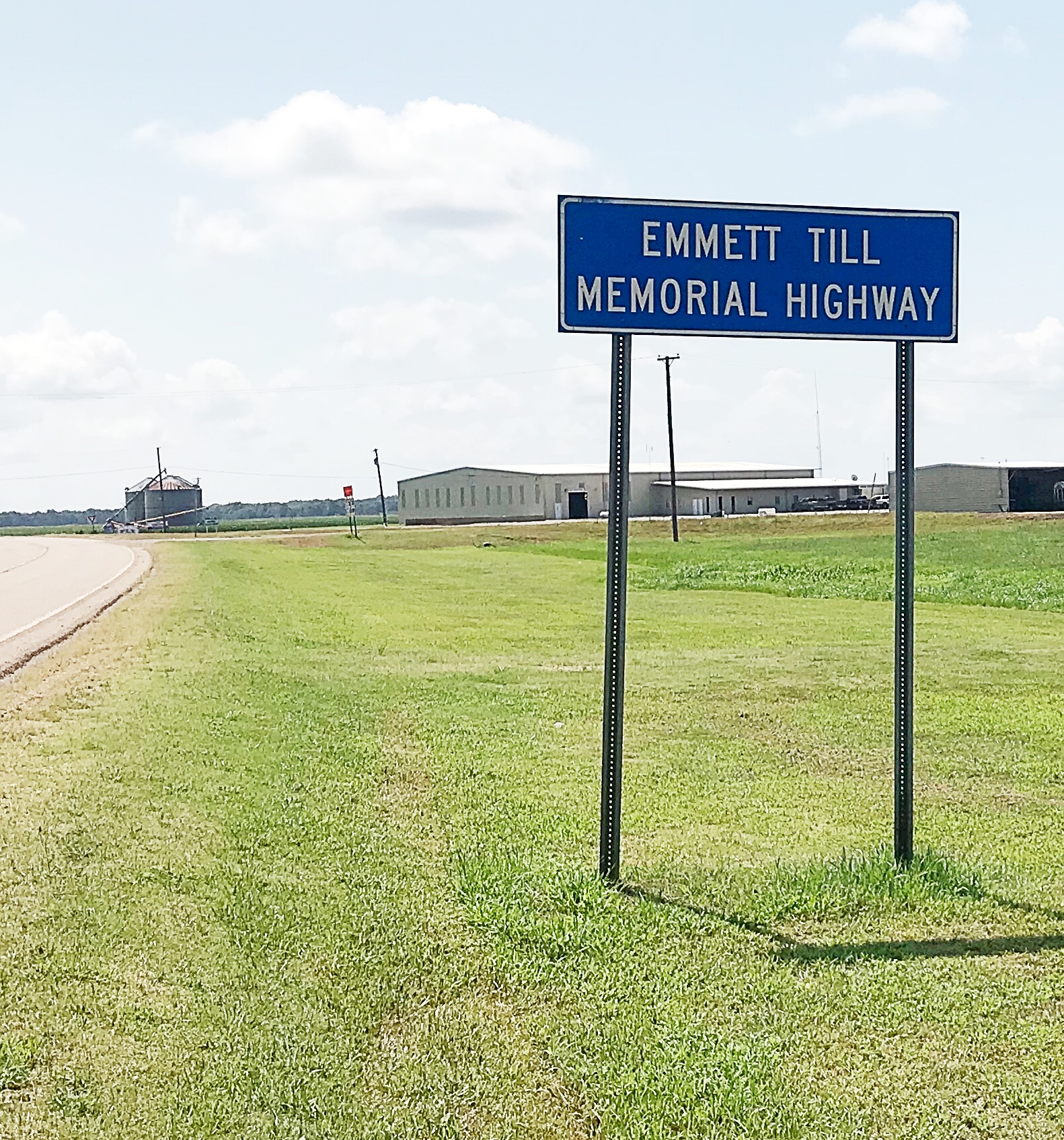
Emmett Till Memorial Highway, US 49E, Tutwiler, Mississippi, 2019

- A statue was unveiled in Denver in 1976 (and has since been moved to Pueblo, Colorado) featuring Till with Martin Luther King Jr.
- In 1984, a section of 71st Street in Chicago was named Emmett Till Road and in 2005, the 71st street bridge was named in his honor.
- In 1989, Till was included among the 40 names of people who had died in the Civil Rights Movement; they are listed as martyrs on the granite sculpture of the Civil Rights Memorial in Montgomery, Alabama.
- A demonstration for Till was held in 2000 in Selma, Alabama, on the 35th anniversary of the march over the Edmund Pettus Bridge. His mother Mamie Till-Mobley attended and later wrote in her memoirs: "I realized that Emmett had achieved the significant impact in death that he had been denied in life. Even so, I had never wanted Emmett to be a martyr. I only wanted him to be a good son. Although I realized all the great things that had been accomplished largely because of the sacrifices made by so many people, I found myself wishing that somehow we could have done it another way."
- In 2005, James McCosh Elementary School in Chicago, where Till had been a student, was renamed the Emmett Louis Till Math And Science Academy.
- In 2006, the Emmett Till Memorial Highway was dedicated between Greenwood and Tutwiler, Mississippi; this was the route his body was taken to the train station, to be returned to his mother for burial in Chicago. It intersects with the H. C. "Clarence" Strider Memorial Highway.
- In 2006, the Emmett Till Memorial Commission was established by the Tallahatchie Board of Supervisors
- In 2007, the Emmett Till Memorial Commission issued a formal apology to Till's family at an event attended by 400 people. It reads:
  We the citizens of Tallahatchie County recognize that the Emmett Till case was a terrible miscarriage of justice. We state candidly and with deep regret the failure to effectively pursue justice. We wish to say to the family of Emmett Till that we are profoundly sorry for what was done in this community to your loved one.
- The same year, Georgia congressman John Lewis sponsored a bill to provide a plan for investigating and prosecuting unsolved (cold case) Civil Rights-era murders. The Emmett Till Unsolved Civil Rights Crime Act was signed into law in 2008.
- In 2008, a memorial plaque that was erected in Tallahatchie County, next to the Tallahatchie River at Graball Landing where Till's body was retrieved, was stolen and never recovered. The plaque was a "frequent target for racist vandalism". The location is in a remote area and down a gravel road, meaning that vandals had to go out of the way to get to it. Its replacement was soon also shot up, as was the replacement sign after that. In October 2019, a new bulletproof sign costing over $10,000, and weighing over 500 pounds (230 kg) was installed. In November 2019, a group of white supremacists was caught making a propaganda video in front of the sign raising new concerns that more vandalism was being planned. The group was carrying a white flag with a black St. Andrews cross, a flag commonly used by a racist Neo-Confederate group called the League of the South. The group quickly scattered when they set off alarms designed to protect the sign.
- The Tallahatchie County Courthouse in Sumner, site of the 1955 trial of Till's killers, was restored and re-opened in 2012. The Emmett Till Interpretive Center opened across the street and is also serving as a community center.
- The Emmett Till Memorial Project is an associated website and smartphone app to commemorate Till's death and his life. It identifies 51 sites in the Mississippi Delta associated with him. On August 29, 2015, the Center held a 60th-anniversary event.
- In 2015, Florida State University Libraries created the Emmett Till archives.
- In 2020, the National Trust for Historic Preservation named Roberts Temple Church of God in Christ, the site of Till's funeral, as one of America's most endangered historic places.
- In 2022, the U.S. Senate voted to award Till and his mother, Mamie Till-Mobley, the Congressional Gold Medal, forwarding the measure for concurrent action in the U.S. House of Representatives. The House passed the measure on December 21, 2022.
- In March 2022, Congress passed the Emmett Till Antilynching Act.
- In October 2022, a bronze statue commemorating Till was unveiled in Greenwood, Mississippi's Rail Spike Park, partially funded by the State of Mississippi.
- On July 25, 2023 (what would have been Till's 82nd birthday), President Biden signed a proclamation establishing the Emmett Till and Mamie Till-Mobley National Monument which honors Till and his mother. The monument will be managed by the National Park Service, and will preserve three areas related to Emmett Till's life and death: Graball Landing in Mississippi, Roberts Temple Church of God in Christ in Chicago, and the Tallahatchie County Second District Courthouse in Mississippi.
- From Memory to Movement: Emmett at 85, a group art exhibition, was mounted at the Blanc Gallery in Chicago, in partnership with the Emmett Till and Mamie Till-Mobley Institute, in the summer of 2026 to commemorate the 85th anniversary of his birth.

=== Casket ===
The story of Emmett Till is one of the most important of the last half of the 20th century. And an important element was the casket ... It is an object that allows us to tell the story, to feel the pain and understand loss. I want people to feel like I did. I want people to feel the complexity of emotions.

— Lonnie Bunch III, director of the Smithsonian's National Museum of African American History and Culture

During a renewed investigation of the crime in 2005, the Department of Justice exhumed Till's remains to conduct an autopsy and DNA analysis which confirmed the identification of his body. As required by state reburial law, Till was reinterred in a new casket later that year. In 2009, his original glass-topped casket was rediscovered, rusting in a dilapidated storage shed at the cemetery. The casket was discolored and the interior fabric torn. It bore evidence that animals had been living in it, although its glass top was still intact. The Smithsonian's National Museum of African American History and Culture in Washington, D.C. acquired the casket a month later.

== Representation in culture ==
Langston Hughes dedicated an untitled poem (eventually to be known as "Mississippi—1955") to Till in his October 1, 1955, column in The Chicago Defender. It was reprinted across the country and continued to be republished with various changes from different writers. William Faulkner, a prominent white Mississippi native who often focused on racial issues, wrote two essays on Till: one before the trial in which he pleaded for American unity and one after, a piece titled "On Fear" that was published in Harper's in 1956. In it he questioned why the tenets of segregation were based on irrational reasoning.

Till's murder was the focus of a 1957 television episode of The United States Steel Hour titled "Noon on Doomsday" written by Rod Serling. He was fascinated by how quickly Mississippi whites supported Bryant and Milam. Although the script was rewritten to avoid mention of Till, and did not say that the murder victim was black, White Citizens' Councils vowed to boycott U.S. Steel. The eventual episode bore little resemblance to the Till case.

Writer James Baldwin loosely based his 1964 drama Blues for Mister Charlie on the Till case. He later divulged that Till's murder had been bothering him for several years.

Anne Moody mentioned the Till case in her autobiography, Coming of Age in Mississippi, in which she states she first learned to hate during the fall of 1955. Audre Lorde's poem "Afterimages" (1981) focuses on the perspective of a black woman thinking of Carolyn Bryant 24 years after the murder and trial. Bebe Moore Campbell's 1992 novel Your Blues Ain't Like Mine centers on the events of Till's death. Toni Morrison mentions Till's death in the novel Song of Solomon (1977) and later wrote the play Dreaming Emmett (1986), which follows Till's life and the aftermath of his death. The play is a feminist look at the roles of men and women in black society, which she was inspired to write while considering "time through the eyes of one person who could come back to life and seek vengeance". Emmylou Harris includes a song called "My Name is Emmett Till" on her 2011 album, Hard Bargain. According to scholar Christopher Metress, Till is often reconfigured in literature as a specter that haunts the white people of Mississippi, causing them to question their involvement in evil, or silence about injustice. The 2021 novel The Trees by Percival Everett uses this theme. The 2002 book Mississippi Trials, 1955 is a fictionalized account of Till's death. The 2015 song by Janelle Monáe "Hell You Talmbout" invokes the names of African-American people—including Emmett Till—who died as a result of encounters with law enforcement or racial violence. In 2016 artist Dana Schutz painted Open Casket, a work based on photographs of Till in his coffin as well as on an account by Till's mother of seeing him after his death.

=== Documentaries ===
- The Murder and the Movement: The Story of the Murder of Emmett Till (1985) by Rich Samuel and produced by Anna Vasser (originally aired on WMAQ-TV in Chicago)
- The Murder of Emmett Till which aired during Season 15 of the TV series American Experience: website links to program transcript and additional materials for the PBS film
- The Untold Story of Emmett Louis Till (2005) by Keith Beauchamp
- Eyes on the Prize: Transcript of 2006 PBS documentary

=== Works inspired by Till ===
This section includes creative works inspired by Till. For non-fiction books on Till, see Bibliography, below.

==== Songs ====
- "The Death of Emmett Till" (1955), written by A. C. Bilbrew, recorded by The Ramparts with Scatman Crothers.
- "The Ballad of Emmett Till" (1956), recorded by Red River Dave (David McEnery), in the TNT label's True Story Series.
- "The Death of Emmett Till" (1962), also known as "The Ballad of Emmett Till", by Bob Dylan.
- "Too Many Martyrs" (1964), by Phil Ochs, mentions and eulogizes Till.
- "My Name is Emmett Till" (2013), from Hard Bargain, the twenty-sixth studio album by Emmylou Harris.
- "Emmett's Ghost" (2021), written and recorded by American blues singer Eric Bibb.
- "True Believer" (2025), written and recorded by Hayley Williams, mentions Till as part of the song's comment on racism in the South.

==== On screen ====
- August 28: A Day in the Life of a People (2016), an anthology film depicting six significant events in African-American history which happened on the same date, August 28. The Smithsonian National Museum of African American History and Culture commissioned Ava DuVernay to create the film which debuted at the museum's opening on September 24, 2016. Events depicted include (among others) Till's lynching.
- My Nephew Emmett (2017), a short film which dramatizes Till's uncle Mose Wright waiting for Till's killers. The film was nominated for the Academy Award for Best Live Action Short Film in 2018.
- Lovecraft Country (2020), a science-fiction television series by HBO which features a fictionalized version of Till, portrayed by Rhyan Hill, as a recurring character who appears in 2 episodes. The episode "Jig-A-Bobo" recreates Till's funeral in Chicago.
- Women of the Movement (2022), a television series which dramatizes Till's life and his mother's activism after his murder.
- Till (2022), a film based on the life of Emmett's mother Mamie Till-Bradley, featuring her life as educator and later activist after his murder.

==== Other ====
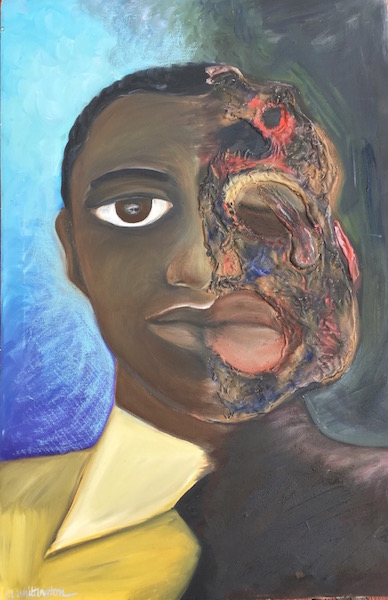
Emmett Till: How She Sent Him and How She Got Him Back (2012), by Lisa Whittington

- "Emmett Till" (1991), a poem by James Emanuel.
- Wolf Whistle (1993), a book by Lewis Nordan.
- Mississippi Trial, 1955 (2003), a juvenile fiction novel by Chris Crowe.
- The State of Mississippi and the Face of Emmett Till (2005), a dramatic play by David Barr.
- A Wreath for Emmett Till (2005), a poem by Marilyn Nelson.
- The Sacred Place (2007), a novel by Daniel Black
- Musical: The Ballad of Emmett Till (2008) by Ifa Bayeza
- Anne and Emmett (2009), a dramatic play by Janet Langhart. An imaginary conversation between Till and Anne Frank, both killed as young teenagers because of racial persecution, the play features recorded narration by Morgan Freeman.
- Gathering of Waters (2012), a fiction novel by Bernice L. McFadden which depicts Till as a spirit which returns to the town of Money to reunite with his first love.
- Emmett Till: How She Sent Him and How She Got Him Back (2012), a painting by Lisa Whittington which is on display at the Mississippi Civil Rights Museum.
- Open Casket (2016), a painting by Dana Schutz which sparked protests and controversy when it was unveiled.
- Ghost Boys (2018), a juvenile novel by Jewell Parker Rhodes which follows the murder of a young black boy and who returns as a ghost, with Till also being another ghost who appears.
- Till (2019), a musical play based on his life, directed by NJ Agwuna.
- The Trees (2021) by Percival Everett, a novel set predominantly in the small town of Money, Mississippi, follows a series of modern-day murders that seem to follow identical patterns and have links to the families of the murderers of Emmett Till.

== Gallery ==
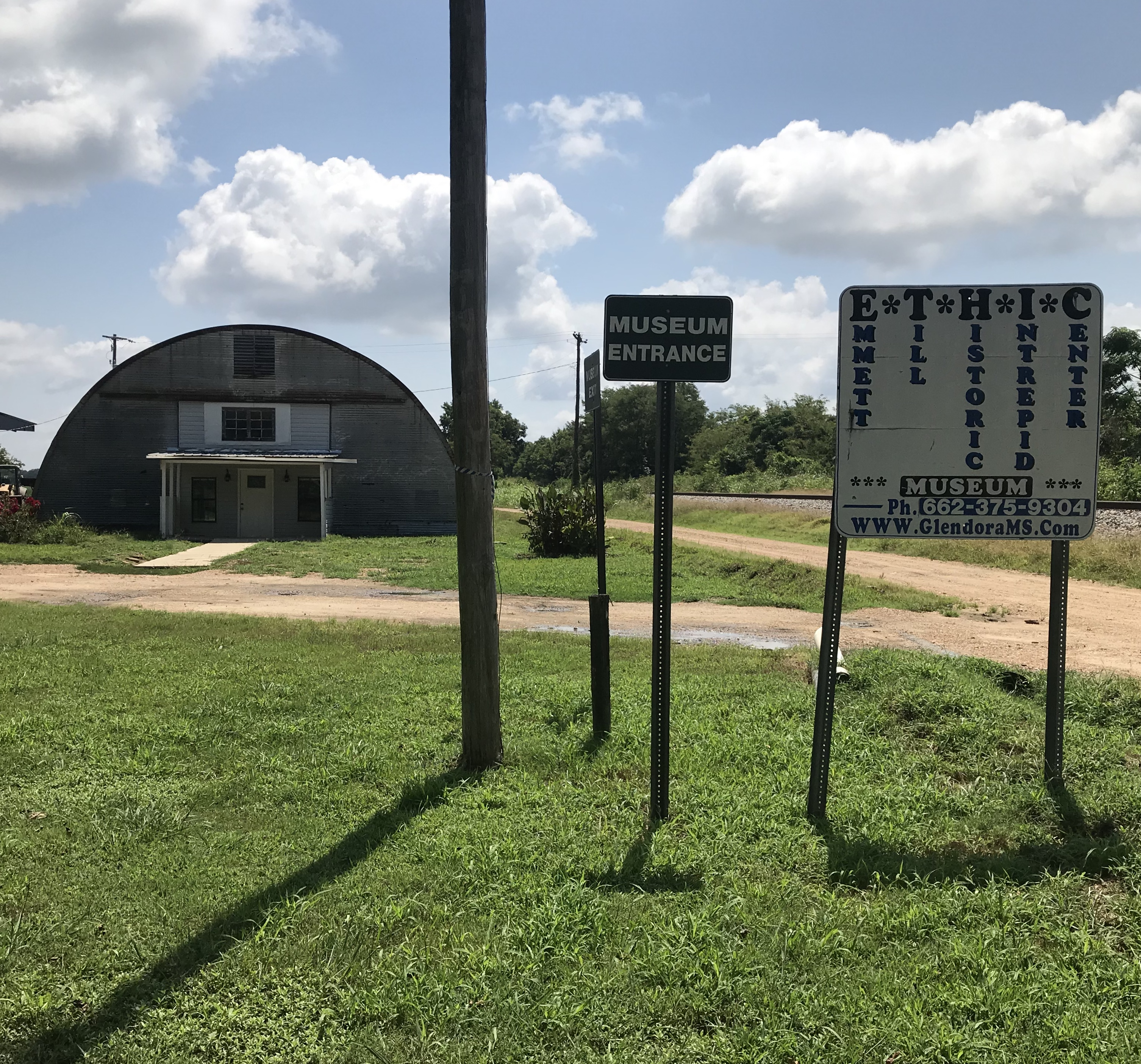
Emmett Till Historic Intrepid Center housed in the old cotton gin of Glendora, Mississippi

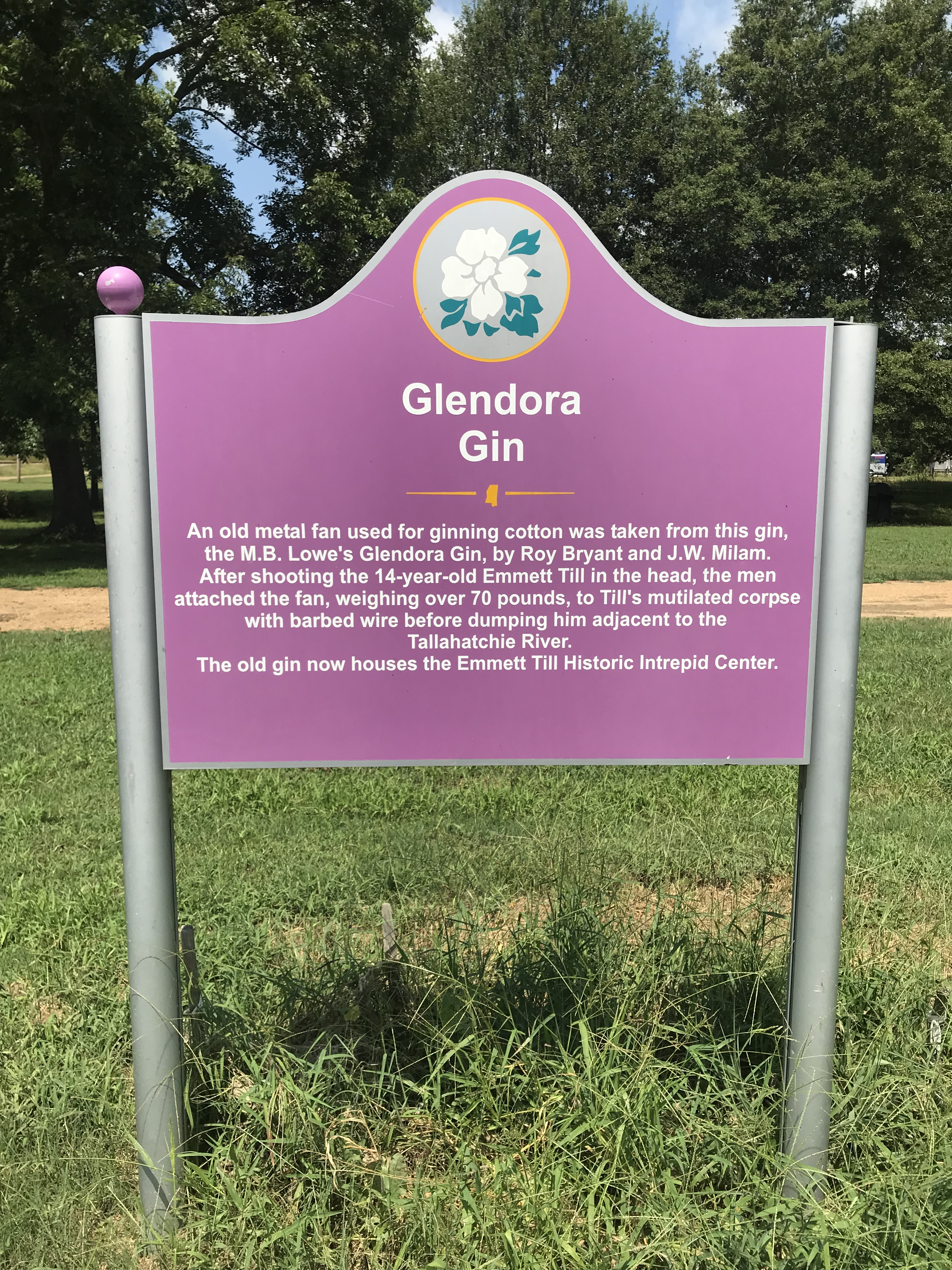
Glendora Gin history sign. Here Milam and Bryant got the fan they used to weigh down Till's body, to sink it in the Tallahatchie River.

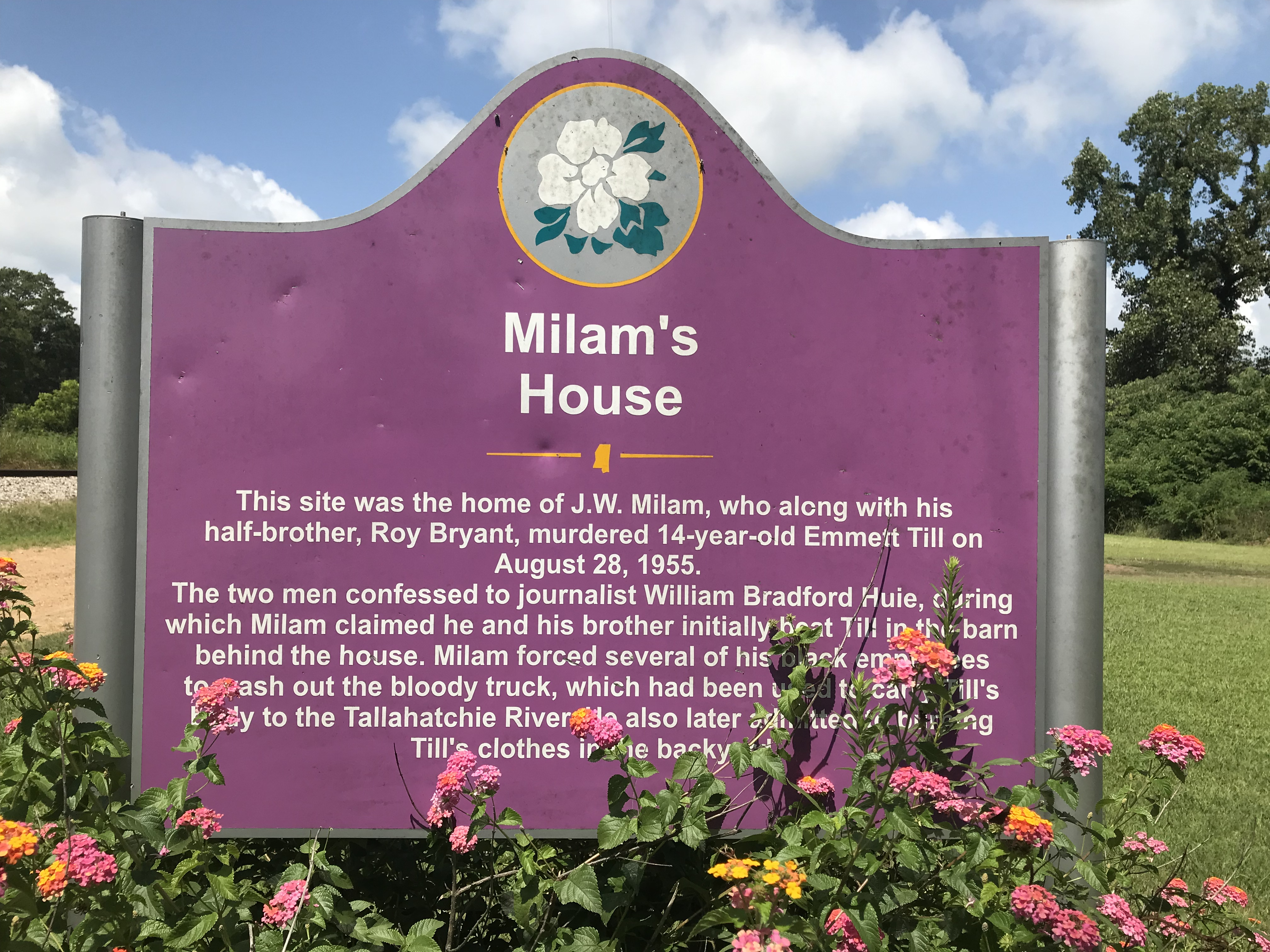
Sign identifying the site of Milam's house, near Glendora Gin

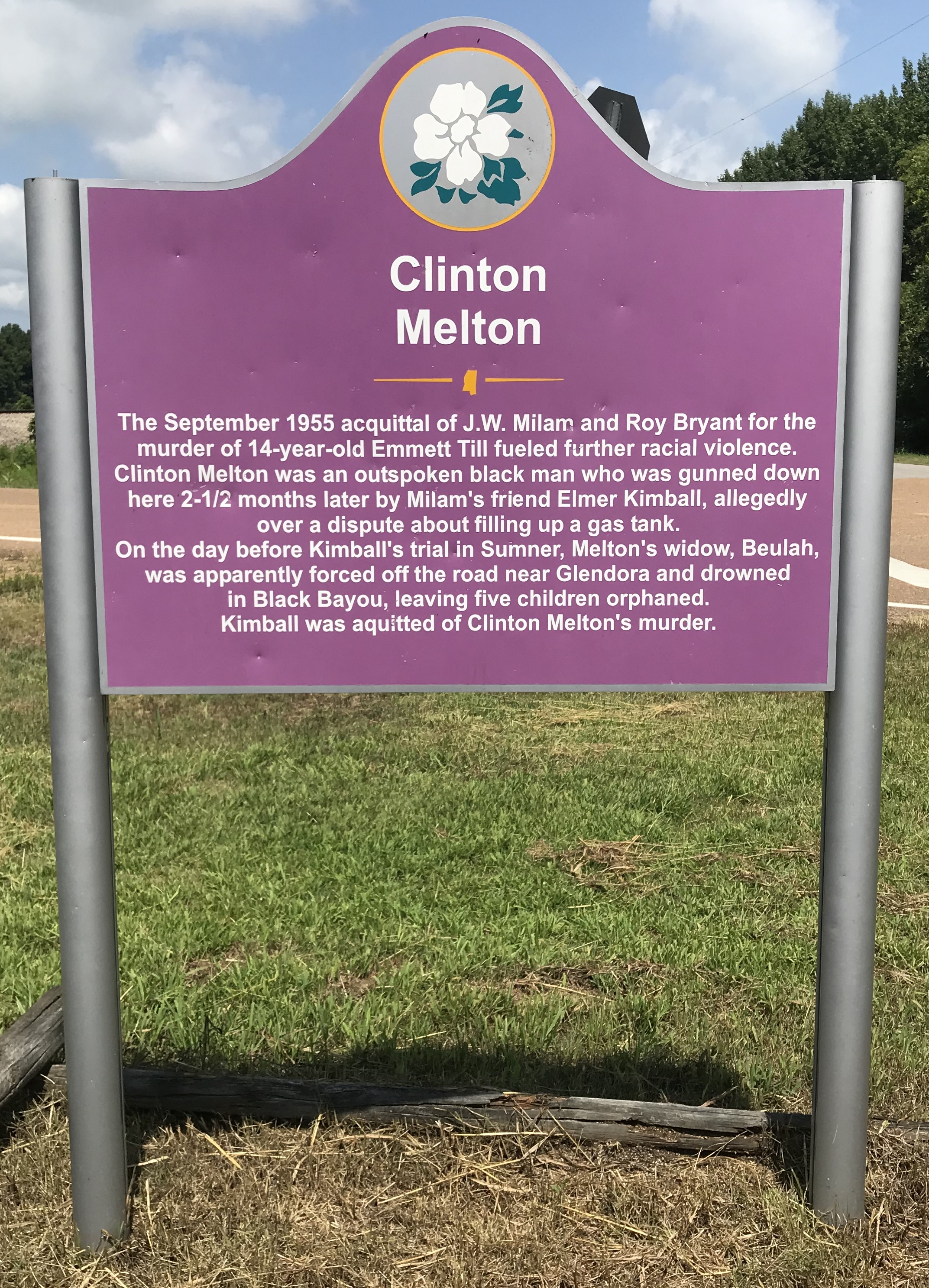
Clinton Melton was the victim of a racially motivated killing a few months after Till. Despite eyewitness testimony, his killer, a friend of Milam's, was acquitted by an all-white jury at the same courthouse.

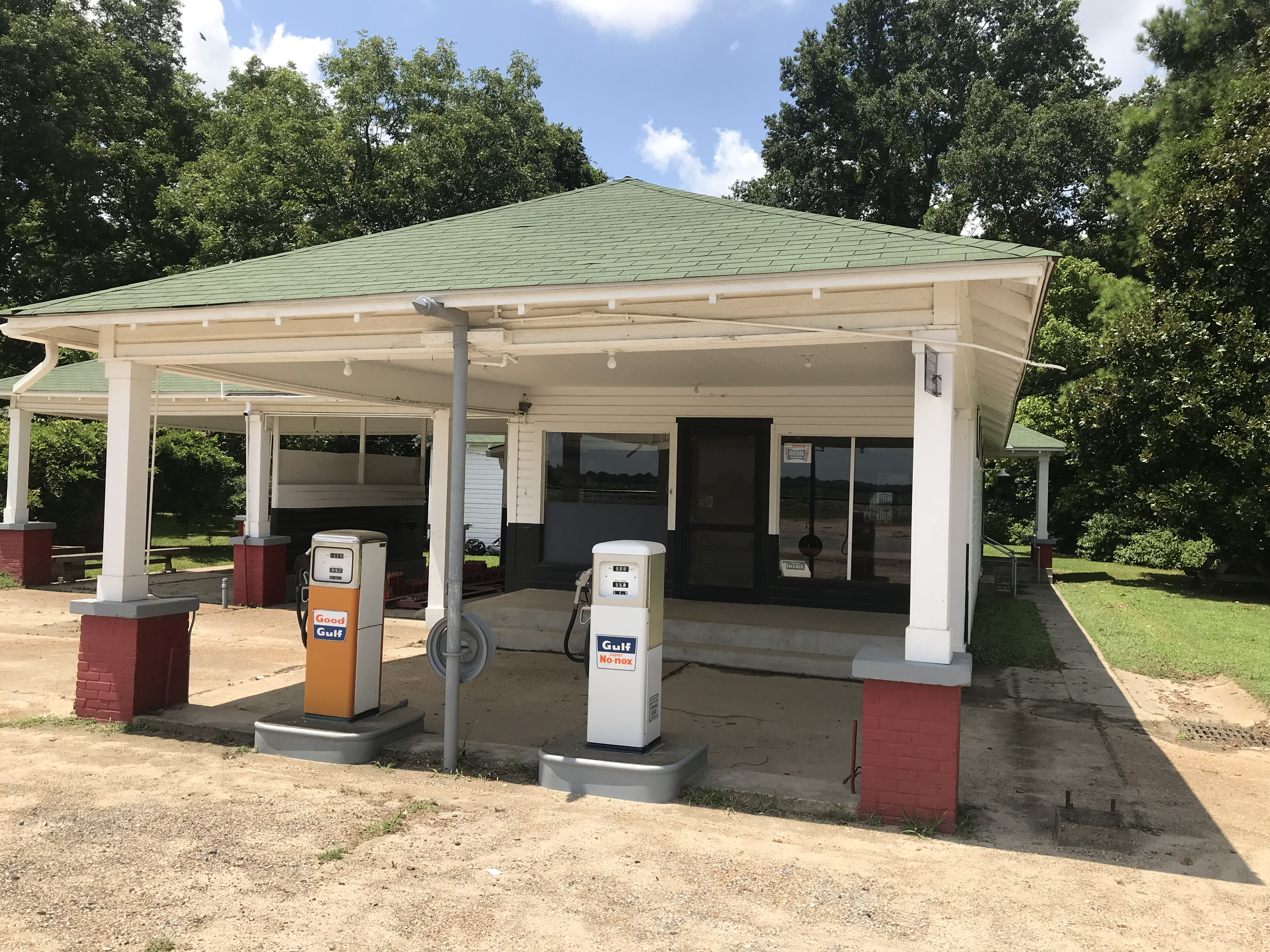
The reconstructed Ben Roy Service Station that stood next to the grocery store where Till encountered Bryant in Money, Mississippi, 2019

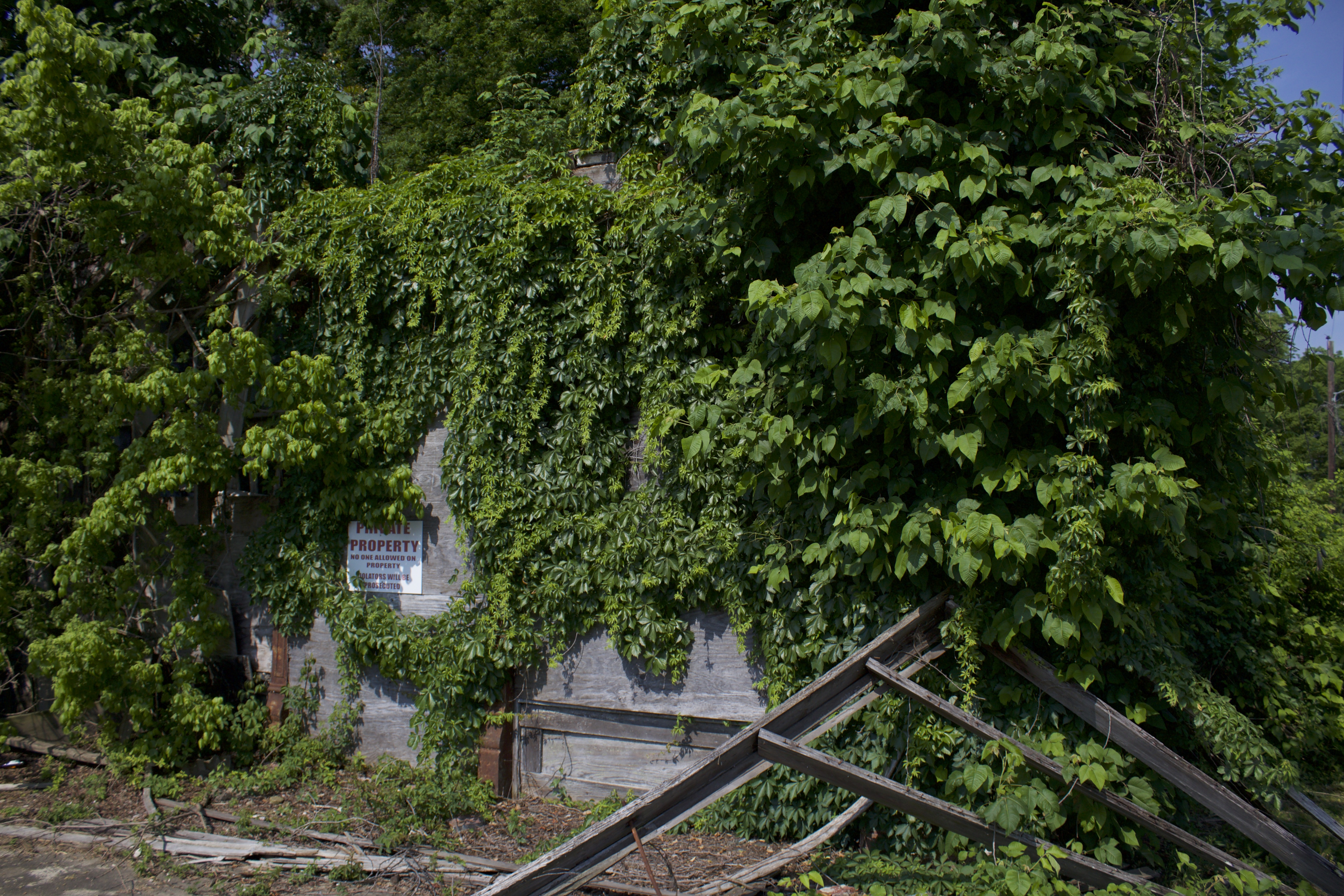
Bryant's Grocery (2018). By 2018, the store was described as "not much left" and given owner's demands, no preservation occurred.

== See also ==
- Duluth lynchings – 1920 lynchings of African-Americans in Minnesota
- George Stinney – African American wrongfully convicted of murder
- Isaac Woodard – American veteran and racial abuse victim (1919–1992)
- Joe Pullen – African-American lynching victim (c. 1883–1923)
- Louis Allen – American businessman and murder victim
- Ossian Sweet – American physician (1895–1960)
- Scottsboro Boys – 1931 false conviction in the US

== Bibliography ==
- Anderson, Devery S. (2015). Emmett Till: The Murder That Shocked the World and Propelled the Civil Rights Movement. Jackson, MS: University Press of Mississippi. ISBN 978-1-4968-0285-9. OCLC 904801152.
- Beito, David; Beito, Linda (2009). Black Maverick: T. R. M. Howard's Fight for Civil Rights and Economic Power. University of Illinois Press. ISBN 9780252034206. OCLC 244246562.
- Carson, Clayborne; Garrow, David; Gill, Gerald; Harding, Vincent; Hine, Darlene Clark, eds. (1991). Eyes on the Prize: Civil Rights Reader Documents, Speeches, and Firsthand Accounts from the Black Freedom Struggle 1954–1990. New York: Viking. ISBN 978-0-670-84217-9. OCLC 23767205.
- Federal Bureau of Investigation (February 9, 2006). Prosecutive Report of Investigation Concerning (Emmett Till) (Report).
- Gorn, Elliott (1998). Muhammad Ali, The People's Champ. Urbana: University of Illinois Press. ISBN 978-0-252-06721-1. OCLC 32014469.
- Hampton, Henry (1990). Voices of Freedom: An Oral History of the Civil Rights Movement from the 1950s through the 1980s. New York: Bantam Books. ISBN 978-0-553-05734-8. OCLC 20628084.
- Houck, Davis; Grindy, Matthew (2008). Emmett Till and the Mississippi Press. University Press of Mississippi. ISBN 9781604733044. OCLC 317329290.
- Kolin, Philip C. (Summer 2008). "The Legacy of Emmett Till". Southern Quarterly. 45 (4): 6–8.
- Metress, Christopher (2002). The Lynching of Emmett Till: A Documentary Narrative. Charlottesville: University of Virginia Press. ISBN 978-0-8139-2122-8. OCLC 49225218.
- Till-Mobley, Mamie; Benson, Chris (2003). Death of Innocence: The Story of the Hate Crime That Changed America. New York: Random House. ISBN 1-4000-6117-2. OCLC 52208468.
- Tyson, Timothy B. (2017). The Blood of Emmett Till. New York: Simon & Schuster. ISBN 978-1-4767-1484-4. OCLC 949922865.
- Whitaker, Hugh Stephen (1963). A Case Study in Southern Justice: The Emmett Till Case (MA). Tallahassee, Florida: Florida State University.
- Whitfield, Stephen (1991). A Death in the Delta: The story of Emmett Till. Baltimore: Johns Hopkins University Press. ISBN 978-0-8018-4326-6. OCLC 23941005.
- Whitten, Ellen (2005). "Revisiting the Murder of Emmett Till". William Winter Institute for Racial Reconciliation. Archived from the original on October 21, 2019.
- Wright, Simeon; Boyd, Herb (2010). Simeon's Story: An Eyewitness Account of the Kidnapping of Emmett Till. Chicago: Lawrence Hill Books. ISBN 978-1-55652-783-8. OCLC 558536178.
