= Emmett Till: How She Sent Him and How She Got Him Back =

2012 painting by Lisa Whittington

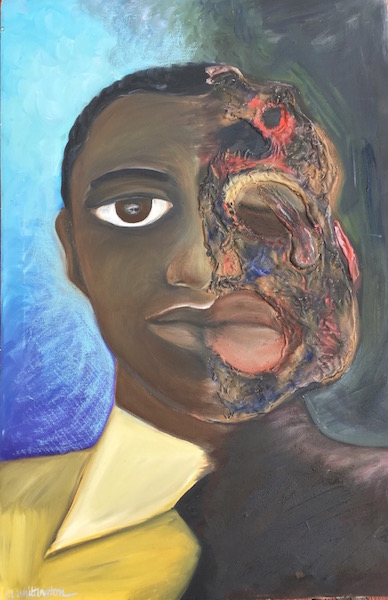
- Artist: Lisa Whittington
- Year: 2012
- Medium: Mixed Media
- Movement: Contemporary art
- Location: Mississippi Civil Rights Museum, Jackson, Mississippi

Emmett Till: How She Sent Him and How She Got Him Back is a 2012 painting by African-American artist Lisa Whittington. The painting is a portrait of Emmett Till, a 14-year old boy who was kidnapped and lynched by two white men in Mississippi for offending a white woman in 1955. The painting depicts Till's face before and after his lynching; Emmett Till's mother, Mamie Till, famously held an open casket funeral for him, showing his mutilated body to visitors and the press. As of February 2019, the painting is displayed at the Mississippi Civil Rights Museum in Jackson, Mississippi.

== Inspiration ==
In an interview with NBC News, Dr. Whittington says that when she "saw a picture of Mamie Till receiving the body of her son at an Illinois terminal after his murder", she was inspired to create the painting. It took her "over ten years" to complete because of the emotional toll it took on her. She worked back and forth between Emmett Till: How She Sent Him and How She Got Him Back, and a separate painting Mamie Till: Grace Under Fire (2018).

== Description ==
The painting is mixed media on canvas, and is 24 inches in length by 36 inches in height. The left side of the painting uses bright colors and clean lines to display Emmett Till's face before he was found lynched. The right side of the painting uses dark colors and texture to display Emmett Till's face after he was found lynched. The detail present in the painting on the right side of the face is consistent with reports done in an autopsy by the FBI, and with witness testimonies given in the same report. It is also accordant with photos of Emmett Till's face before and after the lynching, shared throughout the media after his death.

== Response ==
When another painting depicting Till by Dana Schutz, Open Casket (2016), was controversially shown at the 2017 Whitney Biennial, How She Sent Him and How She Got Him Back was presented by Whittington and other commentators as a positive contrast to Open Casket for its "authentic" and non-abstracted depiction of Black suffering.

== Influences ==
Dr. Lisa Whittington's main influence is Vincent van Gogh. She is fascinated with his work, The Starry Night (1889). In a TED Talk, she says "nobody had ever given [the wind] color until Vincent Van Gogh did that for me." She is also influenced by Frida Kahlo, Jean-Michel Basquiat, Keith Haring, Pablo Picasso, and Romare Bearden.

== Other works ==
Harlem Baby: My Lord What A Morning (2015), I Am A Man (2016), Mamie Till: Grace Under Fire (2018), Emmett, Until (2018), Except As A Punishment For Crime (2019)

== See also ==
- Civil rights movement in popular culture
