= Mississippi–1955 =

1955 poem by Langston Hughes

"Mississippi–1955" or "Mississippi" is a poem written by Langston Hughes in response to the 1955 murder of Emmett Till. Hughes was the first major African American writer to pen a response to the killing, and his poem was widely republished in the weeks that followed. It was initially dedicated to Emmett Till, but did not mention him specifically. Hughes republished the poem in 1965 and 1967, revising it in a way that decreased its specific applicability to Till.

== Background ==
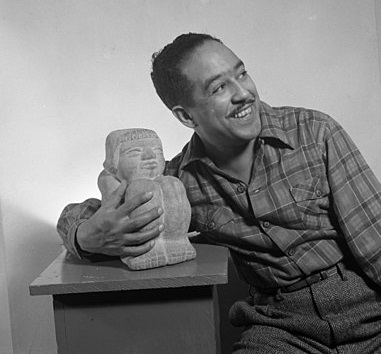
Langston Hughes in 1943

Emmett Till was a fourteen-year-old African American boy who was lynched in Mississippi in 1955, after he allegedly offended a white woman, Carolyn Bryant. Her husband, Roy Bryant, and his half-brother, J. W. Milam, abducted Till, beat and mutilated his body before shooting him in the head and leaving his body in the Tallahatchie River, where it was discovered three days later. Milam and Bryant were arrested and placed on trial for killing Till. The case attracted a large amount of media attention and they were acquitted by an all-white jury on September 24, 1955. Till's killing was one of the sparks of the Civil rights movement of the 1950s and 1960s.

Langston Hughes was "the best-known and most honored African American poet of his generation," a prolific author.

== Writing ==
Langston Hughes began to write "Mississippi–1955" as early as September 16, 1955. He completed it on September 23. The poem was dedicated to Emmett Till's memory. It was published in Hughes' column "Here to Yonder" in The Chicago Defender on October 1. The column was headlined "Langston Hughes Wonders Why No Lynching Probe" and advocated for the United States Congress to intervene and investigate the case. "Mississippi–1955" was included in the article as an untitled 'preface'. This publication had many transcription errors.

The poem later became known as "Mississippi–1955". Hughes gave the NAACP permission to have the poem published in all newspapers that sought to. A slightly revised version, with an added title, was widely republished in October, particularly in African-American newspapers. Many of these republications also had errors.

In September 1965, the poem appeared in the Negro Digest with the dedication removed and other minor revisions made. The title was also shortened to "Mississippi". It was again revised and republished when the poem was included in The Panther and the Lash (1967). This time, Hughes indicated that the poem was taken from the Negro Digest, ignoring its earlier 1955 publication. However, the poem was again in three stanzas and some revisions were reversed. The poem also appeared in the 1994 Collected Poems of Langston Hughes and was mostly unchanged from 1967.

== Content, analysis and reception ==
Hughes was "the first African American poet of note" to write a poem that responded to Till's murder. While the poem was initially dedicated to Emmett Till, it never specifically mentions him and Hughes removed the dedication in later republications. Due to this lack of specificity, the scholar W. Jason Miller feels that there has been "significant confusion about how to read this important poem."

The poem was initially three stanzas, but Hughes combined them in the 1965 republication. The scholar Christopher Metress feels that Hughes' removal of the dedication to Till and 1955 from the title caused the poem to lose "much of its powerful irony"; it wrote Till out and increased a focus on Mississippi. Metress argues that "any trace of Till's remains" are removed from the poem in its 1967 republication. The poem is not one of Hughes' most famous works, and many studies of his life leave it out, which Metress considers a gap in coverage. The professor Myisha Priest wrote an essay that compared the response to Till's killing in "Mississippi" with The Sweet Flypaper of Life. Priest noted that while Till was never referenced in the poem, it does reference the "specter of terror" around the lynching— it focuses more on the event than Till himself.

== Bibliography ==
- Metress, Christopher (2002). The Lynching of Emmett Till: A Documentary Narrative. University of Virginia Press. ISBN 978-0-8139-2122-8.
- Priest, Myisha (2008). "Flesh That Needs to Be Loved: Langston Hughes Writing the Body of Emmett Till". In Pollack, Harriet; Metress, Christopher (eds.). Emmett Till in Literary Memory and Imagination. LSU Press. ISBN 978-0-8071-3540-2.
