= I Have a Dream (sculpture) =

Sculpture in Denver, Colorado, U.S.

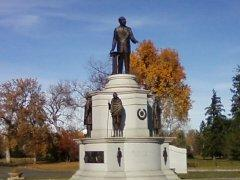
- The memorial in 2008
- Location: Denver, Colorado, U.S.
- 39.746°N 104.954°W

I Have a Dream is a statue of Martin Luther King Jr. and others by Ed Dwight, installed in Denver's City Park, in the U.S. state of Colorado. The memorial was installed in 2002, replacing another statue of King that was relocated to Pueblo. The Denver statue also features depictions of Frederick Douglass, Mahatma Gandhi, Rosa Parks, and Sojourner Truth.

== See also ==
- Civil rights movement in popular culture
- List of artistic depictions of Mahatma Gandhi
- Prathia Hall
