= That Mean Old Yesterday =

2007 book by Stacey Patton

That Mean Old Yesterday: A Memoir
- Author: Stacey Patton
- Language: English
- Genre: Memoir, coming-of-age story
- Publisher: Simon & Schuster
- Publication date: September 4, 2007
- Publication place: United States
- Pages: 336 pp

That Mean Old Yesterday: A Memoir is a 2007 memoir by Stacey Patton.

The book was published by Simon & Schuster.

== Overview ==
A coming-of-age memoir about a young African American woman surviving the foster care system to become an award-winning journalist.

== Critical reception ==
Bangkok Post, "We've all seen, if are not a part of, dysfunctional families," adding, "In her memoir That Mean Old Yesterday, Stacey Patton describes hers. More to the point, this book is about her fight for survival."

Publishers Weekly, "Patton's account is brutal and will likely become controversial, as her racial stereotypes, particularly her assertion that most black children are abused by their parents, may raise eyebrows."

Kirkus Reviews, "Patton's inspiring memoir of survival in an abusive adoptive family offers a well-informed and startling take on violence and racism in America."

AALBC.com, "This book will open your eyes to the realities of child abuse in even the most prestigious African American communities."
