= Statue of Martin Luther King Jr. (Pueblo, Colorado) =

Memorial in Pueblo, Colorado, U.S.

- Martin Luther King, Jr., Prophet for Peace
- Artist: Ed Rose
- Completion date: 1976
- Catalogue: IAS CO000018
- Medium: Bronze, marble
- Dimensions: 5.8 m × 2.1 m × 2.1 m (19 ft × 7 ft × 7 ft)
- Location: Friendly Harbor Community Center; Pueblo, Colorado, U.S.; 38.296012°N 104.612354°W
- Owner: Friendly Harbor Community Center

A 1976 statue of Martin Luther King Jr. and Emmett Till by Ed Rose, sometimes called Martin Luther King Jr., Prophet for Peace, is installed in Pueblo, Colorado. The sculpture was previously installed in Denver's City Park, before being relocated and replaced with another statue of King. The bronze sculpture measures approximately 11 by 4 by 4 feet (3.4 by 1.2 by 1.2 m) and rests on a marble base that measures approximately 8 by 7 by 7 feet (2.4 by 2.1 by 2.1 m).

== See also ==
- Civil rights movement in popular culture
