= The Untold Story of Emmett Louis Till =

2005 film

- Directed by: Keith Beauchamp
- Distributed by: ThinkFilm
- Release date: 2005
- Running time: 68 minutes
- Country: United States
- Language: English

The Untold Story of Emmett Louis Till is a 2005 documentary film about the murder of Emmett Till. It was directed by Keith Beauchamp. The film contributed to the case being reopened by the U.S. Department of Justice.

== Background ==
In August 1955, 14-year-old African American Emmett Till was murdered for whistling at a white woman at a store in Money, Mississippi. The woman's relatives kidnapped Till and murdered him, leaving his body in a river. Till's mother held an open-casket funeral for her son to the public to demonstrate the brutality of racism in the Southern United States. The accused murderers were acquitted despite large amounts of evidence for their involvement in the murder.

== Production ==
In 1996, Beauchamp began investigating the crime as part of a planned documentary feature. His research and work conducting interviews for the film took over nine years, and ultimately contributed to the case being reopened by the U.S. Department of Justice in 2004. The Untold Story of Emmett Louis Till was the first film to investigate the murder and was the second film to be released about it, after The Murder of Emmett Till aired on PBS.

== Plot ==
The film examines the circumstances surrounding the 1955 murder of Emmett Till, and claims that fourteen people were involved. This number included five black employees of the five white men implicated in the murder, "as well as the woman that Till whistled at".

The film is interspersed with interviews, as well as television and news video that includes the men who were accused of the murder. Beauchamp interviews multiple eyewitnesses who were previously scared of retaliation. Beauchamp interviewed Emmett's cousins who were at the house during the kidnapping. The film has the victim's mother, Mamie Till, reminisce about her son's life and his murder.

== Home media ==
The film was released on DVD by ThinkFilm in 2005. The DVD includes an audio commentary by the director and a theatrical trailer.

== Reception ==
Ronnie Scheib of Variety wrote, "Beauchamp expertly excerpts long stretches from the extensive television coverage of the 1955 events, juxtaposing them with present-day interviews with the people who lived though these traumatic happenings." Kam Williams of BlackFilm said, "Now, filmmaker Keith Beauchamp has successfully embarrassed the Feds into re-opening the case. [...] in researching and conducting interviews for his damning documentary, The Untold Story of Emmett Till."

Neely Tucker of The Washington Post said, "That is what is known as poetry, and it is frustrating the documentary doesn't have more of it. For a movie that bills itself as "untold," there's no "gee-whiz" moment of revelation. There are many fine interviews, apparently some of them new, but there is no narration to tell us which ones."

The film won the National Board of Review Award in 2005 for Special Recognition of Films That Reflect Freedom of Expression.

== See also ==
- Till (film)
- 1956 Sugar Bowl
- civil rights movement
- Civil rights movement in popular culture
