= Stacey Patton =

American journalist, author and professor

- Born: United States
- Occupations: Journalist, author, professor
- Notable work: That Mean Old Yesterday

Stacey Patton is an American journalist, writer, author, speaker, commentator and college professor.

== Early life ==
Born in Montclair, New Jersey, Patton ran away from home and was placed in an adoptive home in Trenton, New Jersey. Patton was awarded a scholarship to attend the Lawrenceville School, where she earned honors as a basketball player, and played for the NYU Violets women's basketball team.

== Career ==
Patton has written for The Baltimore Sun, Al Jazeera, BBC America, The New York Times, The Washington Post, The Dallas Morning News, NewsOne, and The Root.

She is also author of the books Spare the Kids: Why Whupping Children Won't Save Black America published by Beacon Press., Not My Cat, a children's book published by Simon & Schuster, and Strung Up: How White America Learned to Lynch Black Children (Beacon Press).

Patton, a former senior enterprise reporter for The Chronicle of Higher Education, was previously a professor of multimedia journalism at Morgan State University's School of Global Journalism and Communication and founder of the anti-child abuse movement Spare the Kids, Inc. She is a research associate professor at Morgan State University and she teaches journalism at Howard University in Washington, D.C.

In 2012, Womanspace of Mercer County, New Jersey, a nonprofit organization that provides help for victims and survivors of domestic and sexual violence, awarded its annual Barbara Boggs Sigmund Award to Patton. She has won reporting awards from the William Randolph Hearst Foundation, National Association of Black Journalists, the Scripps Howard Foundation, National Education Writers Association, and she was the 2015 recipient of the Vernon Jarrett Medal for her reporting on race.

Also in 2012, Patton published an article in The Chronicle of Higher Education challenging scholars and students in the fields of Black/African-American studies to address the "gap" of discussing taboo subjects – such as "black sexual agency, pleasure and intimacy, or same-sex relationships" – within the aforementioned fields. In 2017, the Black Studies Department at the University of Missouri dedicated its annual Black Studies Fall Conference to the discussions brought up in Patton's article.

Patton is also the author of the memoir That Mean Old Yesterday, was published by Simon & Schuster.

After the assassination of Charlie Kirk in 2025, Patton wrote that she had been subject to racist abuse and death threats after she had been placed on Turning Point USA's Professor Watchlist in 2016, and that she held Kirk responsible for this, describing him as a "hateful racist".
