= San Diego Film Critics Society Awards 2022 =

27th San Diego Film Critics Society Awards

27th San Diego Film Critics Society Awards
- Date: January 6, 2023
- Site: San Diego, California, U.S.

Highlights
- Best Picture: The Banshees of Inisherin
- Most awards: The Banshees of Inisherin (6)
- Most nominations: The Banshees of Inisherin (11); Everything Everywhere All at Once (11)

The 27th San Diego Film Critics Society Awards were announced on January 6, 2023. The nominations were announced on January 3, 2023, with The Banshees of Inisherin and Everything Everywhere All at Once leading the nominations with eleven each, followed by The Fabelmans with eight.

The Banshees of Inisherin won the most awards with six wins, including Best Picture.

== Winners and nominees ==
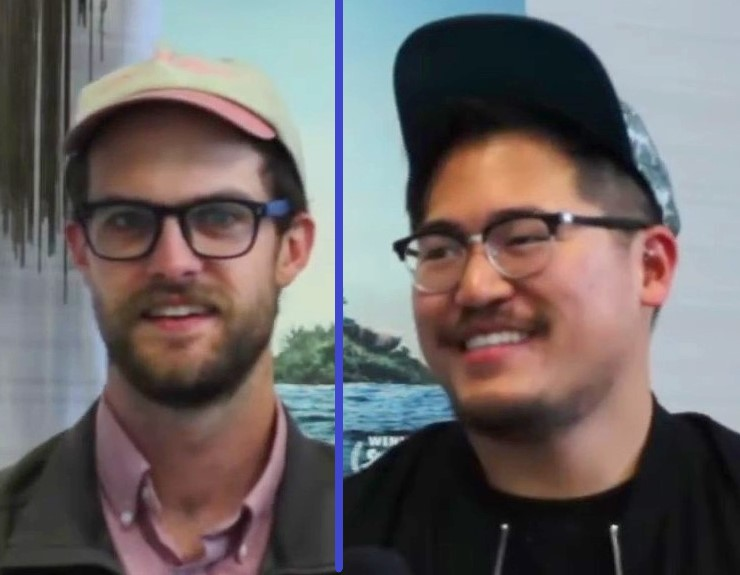
Daniel Scheinert and Daniel Kwan, Best Director winners

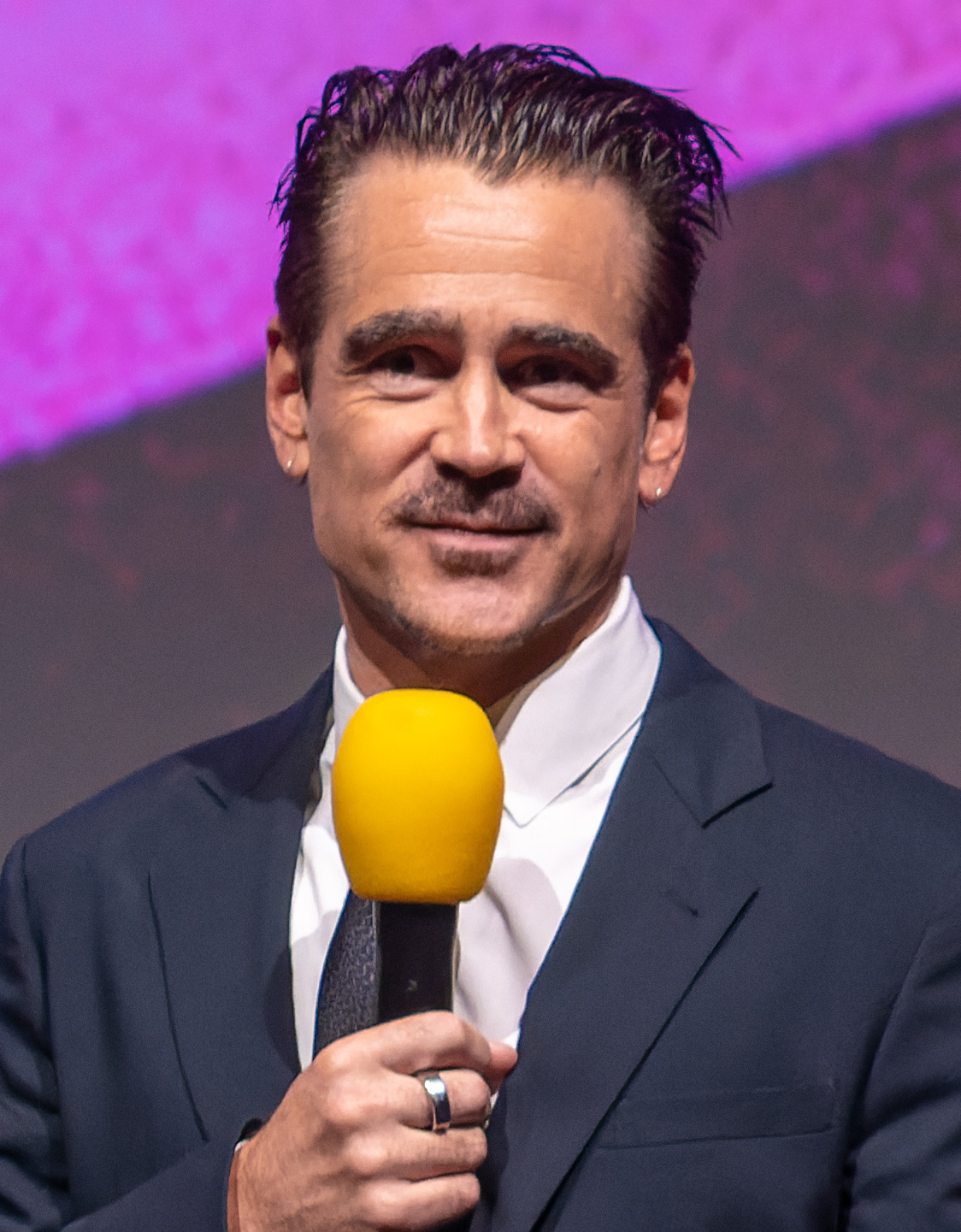
Colin Farrell, Best Actor and Best Body of Work winner

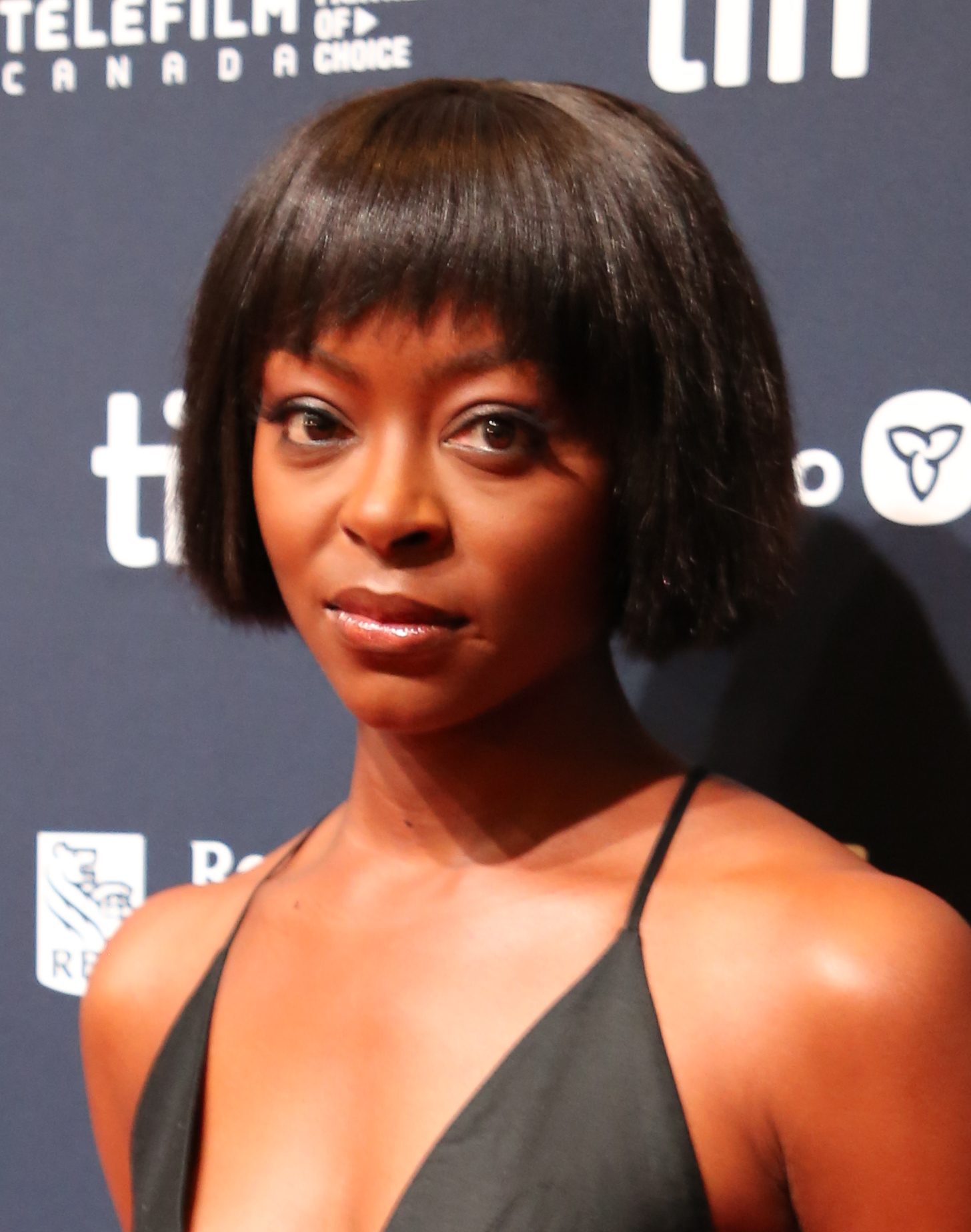
Danielle Deadwyler, Best Actress winner

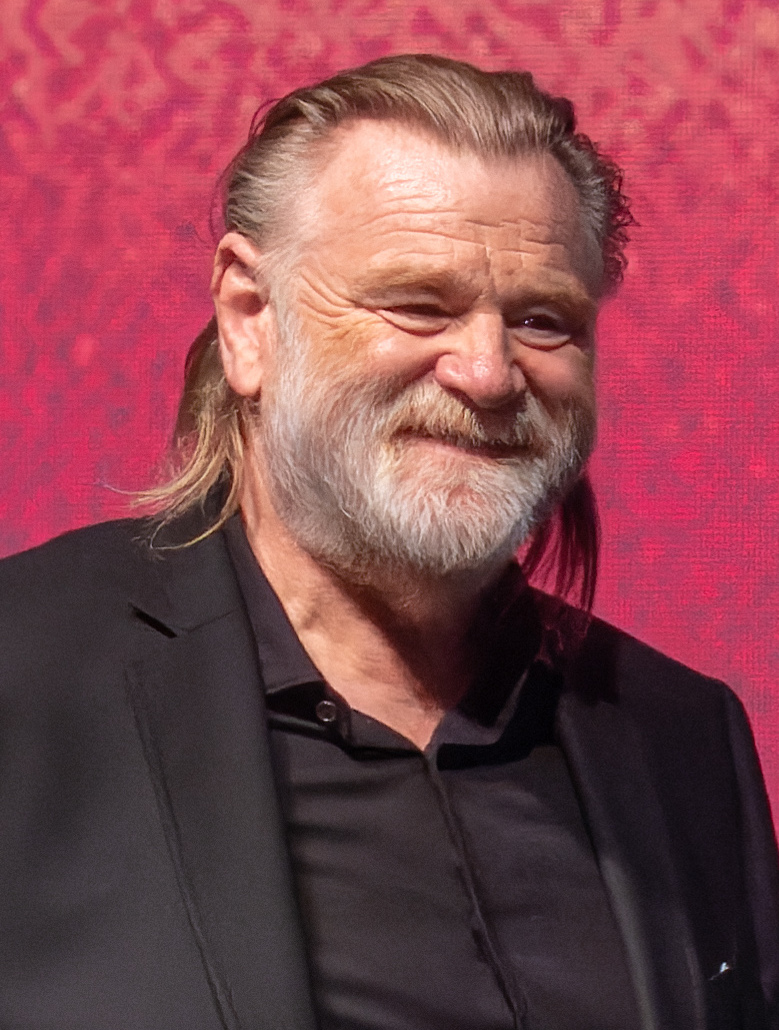
Brendan Gleeson, Best Supporting Actor winner

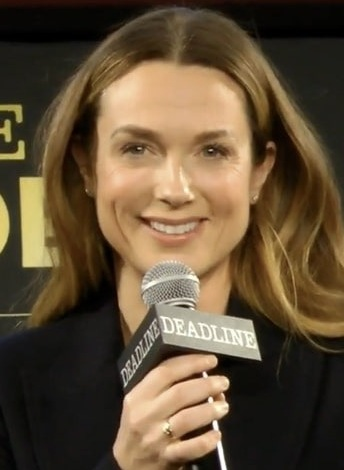
Kerry Condon, Best Supporting Actress winner

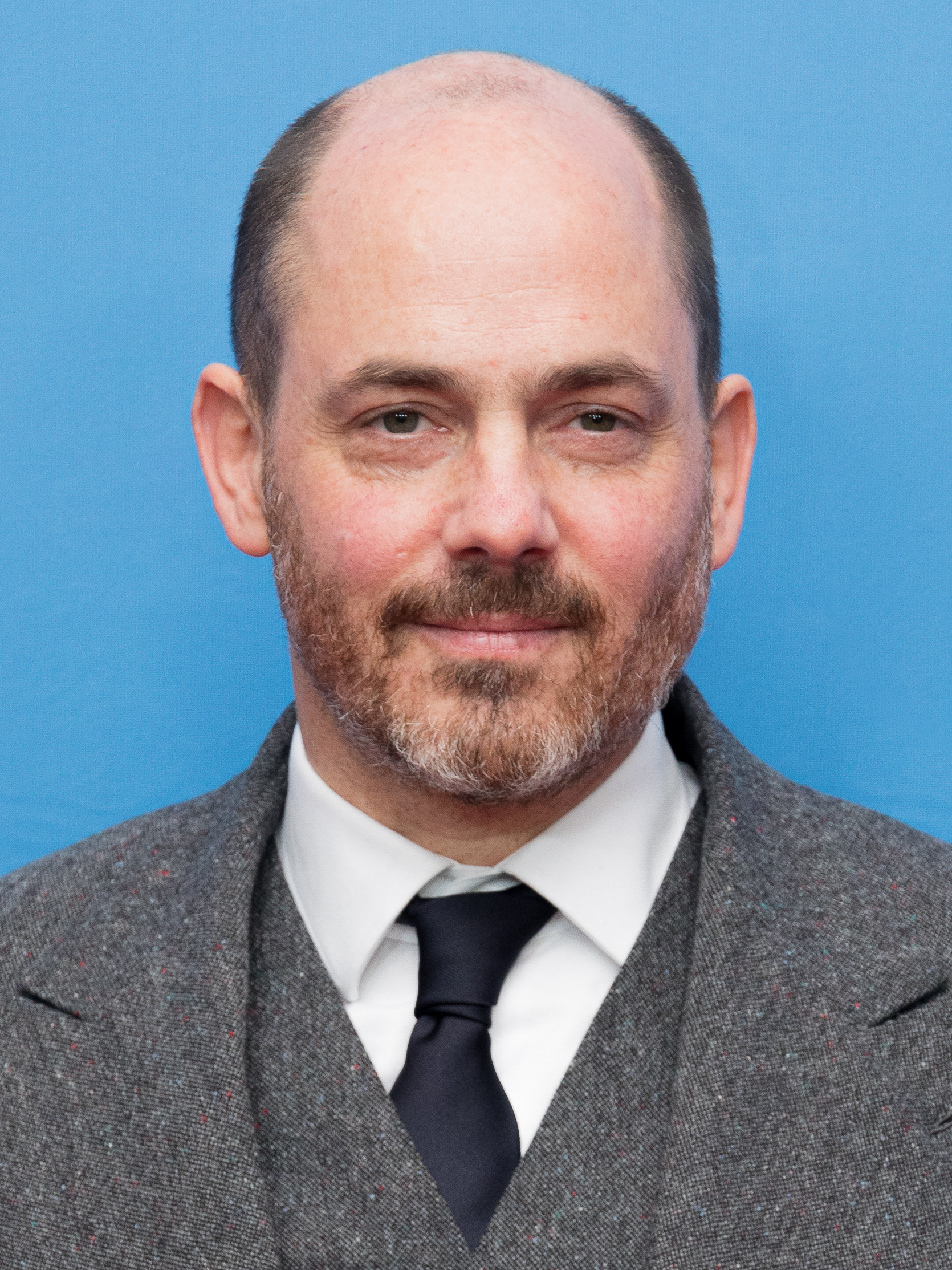
Edward Berger, Best Adapted Screenplay co-winner

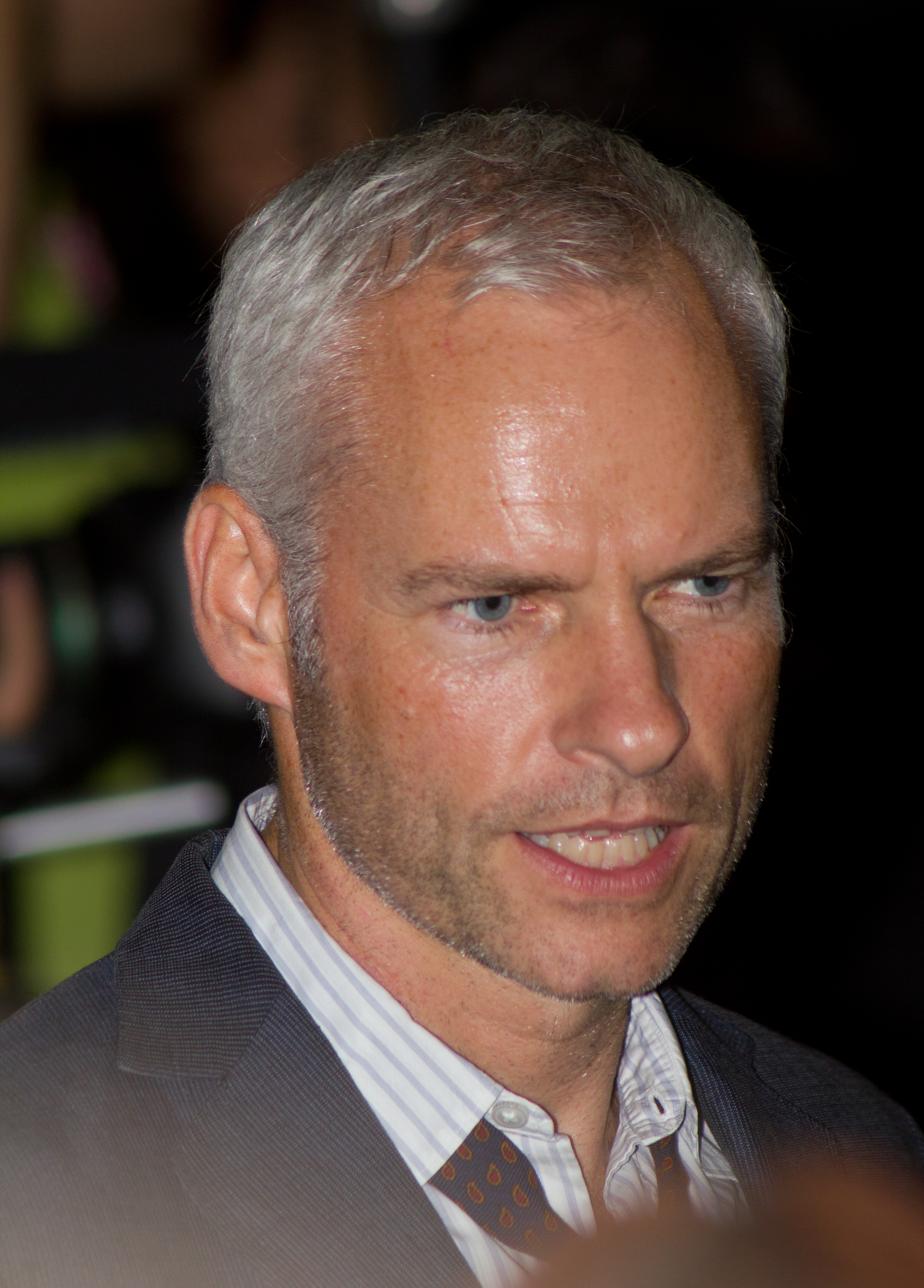
Martin McDonagh, Best Original Screenplay winner

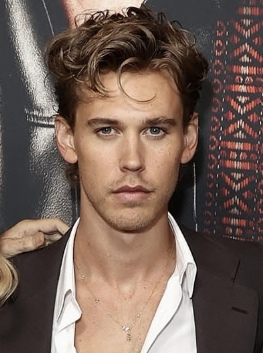
Austin Butler, Best Breakthrough Artist winner

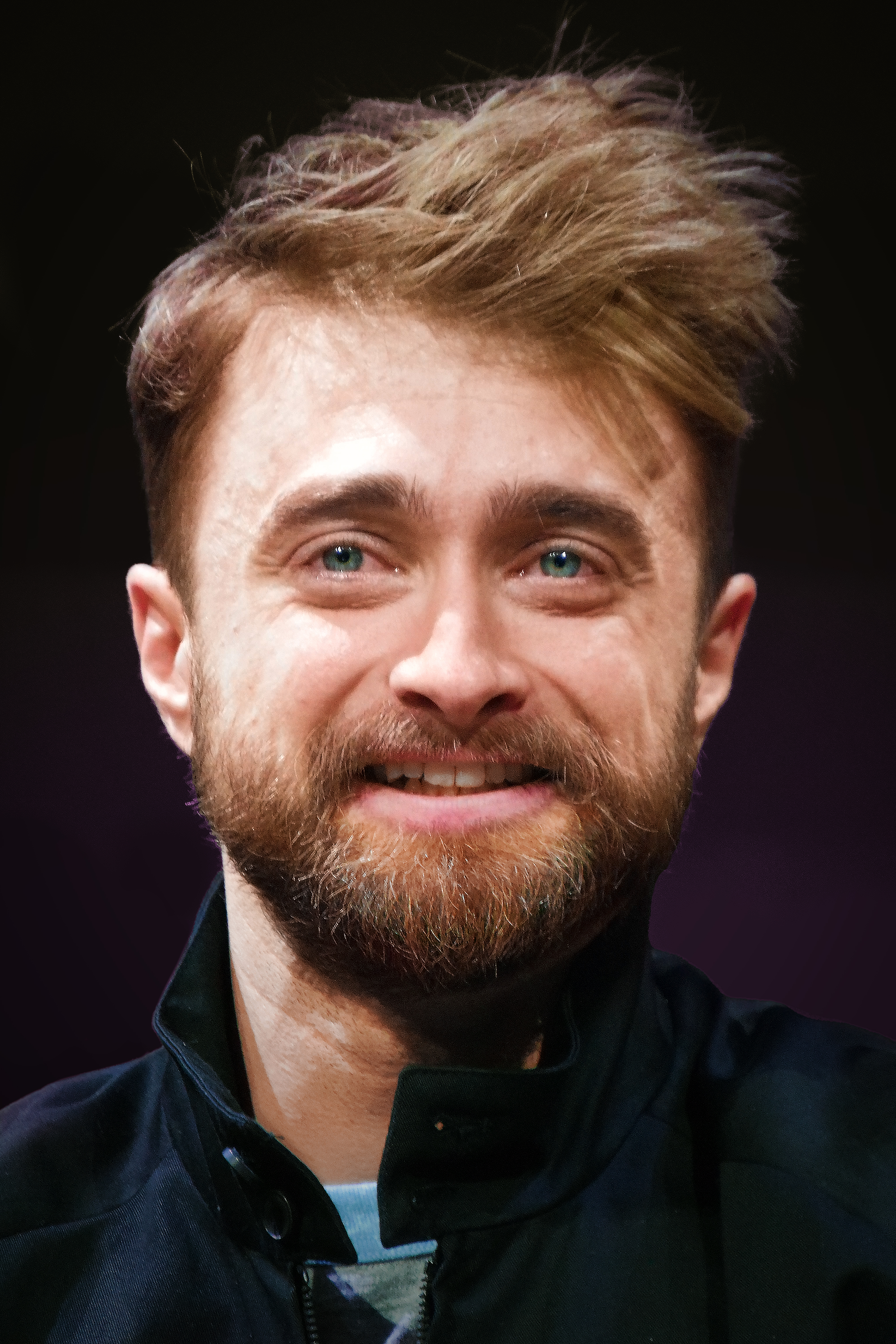
Daniel Radcliffe, Best Comedic Performance winner

Winners are listed at the top of each list in bold, while the runner-ups and nominees for each category are listed under them.

Best Picture	Best Director
**The Banshees of Inisherin**: Runner-Up: Tár; Elvis; Everything Everywhere All at Once; The Fabelmans	**Daniel Kwan and Daniel Scheinert – Everything Everywhere All at Once**: Runner-Up: Steven Spielberg – The Fabelmans; Edward Berger – All Quiet on the Western Front; Todd Field – Tár; Martin McDonagh – The Banshees of Inisherin
Best Actor	Best Actress
**Colin Farrell – The Banshees of Inisherin as Pádraic Súilleabháin**: Runner-Up: Austin Butler – Elvis as Elvis Presley; Ralph Fiennes – The Menu as Chef Slowik; Brendan Fraser – The Whale as Charlie; Gabriel LaBelle – The Fabelmans as Sammy Fabelman	**Danielle Deadwyler – Till as Mamie Till-Mobley**: Runner-Up: Cate Blanchett – Tár as Lydia Tár; Regina Hall – Honk for Jesus. Save Your Soul. as Trinitie Childs; Michelle Williams – The Fabelmans as Mitzi Fabelman; Michelle Yeoh – Everything Everywhere All at Once as Evelyn Quan Wang
Best Supporting Actor	Best Supporting Actress
**Brendan Gleeson – The Banshees of Inisherin as Colm Doherty**: Runner-Up: Brian Tyree Henry – Causeway as James Aucoin; Barry Keoghan – The Banshees of Inisherin as Dominic Kearney; Ke Huy Quan – Everything Everywhere All at Once as Waymond Wang; Mark Rylance – Bones and All as Sully	**Kerry Condon – The Banshees of Inisherin as Siobhán Súilleabháin**: Runner-Up: Stephanie Hsu – Everything Everywhere All at Once as Joy Wang / Jobu Tupaki; Jamie Lee Curtis – Everything Everywhere All at Once as Deirdre Beaubeirdre; Nina Hoss – Tár as Sharon Goodnow; Lashana Lynch – The Woman King as Izogie
Best Adapted Screenplay	Best Original Screenplay
**Edward Berger, Lesley Paterson, and Ian Stokell – All Quiet on the Western Front**: Runner-Up: Guillermo del Toro, Gris Grimly, Patrick McHale, and Matthew Robbins – Guillermo del Toro's Pinocchio; Runner-Up: Samuel D. Hunter – The Whale; Runner-Up: David Kajganich – Bones and All; Runner-Up: Sarah Polley and Miriam Toews – Women Talking	**Martin McDonagh – The Banshees of Inisherin**: Runner-Up: Daniel Kwan and Daniel Scheinert – Everything Everywhere All at Once; Keith Beauchamp, Chinonye Chukwu, and Michael Reilly – Till; Todd Field – Tár; Seth Reiss and Will Tracy – The Menu
Best Breakthrough Artist	Best Comedic Performance
**Austin Butler – Elvis as Elvis Presley**: Runner-Up: Danielle Deadwyler – Till as Mamie Till-Mobley; Runner-Up: Anna Diop – Nanny as Aisha; Runner-Up: Taylor Russell – Bones and All as Maren Yearly; Jessie Buckley – Women Talking as Mariche Loewen	**Daniel Radcliffe – Weird: The Al Yankovic Story as "Weird Al" Yankovic**: Runner-Up: Daniel Craig – Glass Onion: A Knives Out Mystery as Benoit Blanc; Nicolas Cage – The Unbearable Weight of Massive Talent as Himself; Brian Tyree Henry – Bullet Train as Lemon; Brad Pitt – Bullet Train as Ladybug
Best Animated Film	Best Documentary
**Guillermo del Toro's Pinocchio**: Runner-Up: Marcel the Shell with Shoes On; Runner-Up: Turning Red; Puss in Boots: The Last Wish; Wendell & Wild	**Wildcat**: Runner-Up: Fire of Love; All the Beauty and the Bloodshed; Good Night Oppy; Navalny
Best Foreign Language Film	Best Ensemble
**All Quiet on the Western Front**: Runner-Up: Happening; Close; Decision to Leave; RRR	**Everything Everywhere All at Once**: Runner-Up: The Banshees of Inisherin; Runner-Up: Women Talking; Glass Onion: A Knives Out Mystery; The Menu
Best Cinematography	Best Editing
**Linus Sandgren – Babylon**: Runner-Up: Ben Davis – The Banshees of Inisherin; Russell Carpenter – Avatar: The Way of Water; Janusz Kamiński – The Fabelmans; Sayombhu Mukdeeprom – Thirteen Lives	**Paul Rogers – Everything Everywhere All at Once**: Runner-Up: Jonathan Redmond and Matt Villa – Elvis; Runner-Up: Sarah Broshar and Michael Kahn – The Fabelmans; David Brenner, James Cameron, John Refoua, Stephen E. Rivkin, and Ian Silverstein – Avatar: The Way of Water; Mikkel E. G. Nielsen – The Banshees of Inisherin
Best Costume Design	Best Production Design
**Catherine Martin and Rachelle Mejia – Elvis**: Runner-Up: Jenny Beavan – Mrs. Harris Goes to Paris; Ruth E. Carter – Black Panther: Wakanda Forever; Marci Rodgers – Till; Mary Zophres – Babylon	**Florencia Martin – Babylon**: Runner-Up: Rick Carter – The Fabelmans; Katie Byron – Don't Worry Darling; Rick Heinrichs – Glass Onion: A Knives Out Mystery; Jason Kisvarday – Everything Everywhere All at Once
Best Sound Design	Best Visual Effects
**Top Gun: Maverick**: Runner-Up: Elvis; Avatar: The Way of Water; Bullet Train; Tár	**Avatar: The Way of Water**: Runner-Up: Top Gun: Maverick; Doctor Strange in the Multiverse of Madness; Everything Everywhere All at Once; Guillermo del Toro's Pinocchio
Best Use of Music	Best Youth Performance (For a performer under the age of 16)
**Elvis**: Runner-Up: Tár; The Banshees of Inisherin; The Fabelmans; Weird: The Al Yankovic Story	**Jaylin Webb – Armageddon Time as Johnny Davis**: Runner-Up: Jalyn Hall – Till as Emmett Till; Runner-Up: Banks Repeta – Armageddon Time as Paul Graff; Madeleine McGraw – The Black Phone as Gwen; Malea Emma Tjandrawidjaja – After Yang as Mika
Special Award for Body of Work
**Colin Farrell (After Yang, The Banshees of Inisherin, The Batman, and Thirteen Lives)**: Runner-Up: Ethan Hawke (The Black Phone, Glass Onion: A Knives Out Mystery, The Northman, and Raymond & Ray); Runner-Up: Florence Pugh (Don't Worry Darling, Puss in Boots: The Last Wish, and The Wonder)
