= Cross to Bear =

Cross to Bear may refer to:

- "Cross to Bear", a song by Barry Gibb from his 2016 album In the Now
- A Cross to Bear, a 2012 American film directed by Tandria Potts
- My Cross to Bear, an autobiographic memoir of American songwriter-musician Gregg Allman
- It's Not My Cross to Bear, a song by Gregg Allman
