= Catherine Dyer =

American actress

- Occupations: Actress, producer
- Years active: 1993–present

Catherine Dyer is an American actress, director, photographer and producer.

== Life and career ==
Catherine Dyer graduated from the American Academy of Dramatic Arts in New York City. and is currently the co-founder/owner of the premiere acting studio in Atlanta, Drama Inc.

Dyer moved to Los Angeles where she wrote/performed a one-woman-show called Sorry to Keep You Waiting. Later, she worked off-screen as a Development Assistant for Lifetime Television's Original Movies Department. In 1997, she returned to New York City to work as a Supervising Producer on A&E Television documentary series, Biography receiving a Primetime Emmy Award nomination in 2003.

Dyer returned to acting in 2008, playing a recurring role in the Lifetime drama series, Army Wives. She later guest-starred on Drop Dead Diva, Necessary Roughness, Devious Maids, The Originals, Greenleaf and Queen Sugar. In 2016, she had a recurring role as Agent Connie Frazier during the first season of Netflix series, Stranger Things. She later had a recurring roles on The Resident, The Morning Show , and The Terminal List.

Dyer appeared in a number of movies, including Halloween II directed by Rob Zombie (2009), The Blind Side with Sandra Bullock (2009), Sabotage with Arnold Schwarzenegger(2014), Dirty Grandpa with Robert DeNiro (2016), The Darkest Minds (2018), and Nappily Ever After (2018). In 2019, she played main antagonist (received 'Best Villain nomination') in the independent thriller film, The Devil to Pay opposite Danielle Deadwyler. She later was cast in the Netflix thriller, Reptile. with Benicio del Toro and Alicia Silverstone In 2023. Ms. Dyer also played a leading role in the Lifetime thriller The Surrogate Scandal. and she can be seen most recently, in The Rivals of Amziah King with Matthew McConaughey and upcoming in Heartland with Jessica Chastain.

== Filmography ==
- Road Kill (1999)
- Halloween II (2009)
- The Joneses (2009)
- The Blind Side (2009)
- What to Expect When You're Expecting (2009)
- Sabotage (2014)
- Taken 3 (2014)
- Accidental Love (2015)
- Dirty Grandpa (2016)
- Cell (2016)
- The Founder (2016)
- Hot Summer Nights (2017)
- Megan Leavey (2017)
- I, Tonya (2017)
- Simran (2017)
- Forever My Girl (2018)
- Steel Country (2018)
- The Darkest Minds (2018)
- An Actor Prepares (2018)
- Nappily Ever After (2018)
- Gilda Sue Rosenstern: The Motion Picture! (2019)
- The Devil to Pay (2019)
- Pageant Material (2019)
- A Unicorn for Christmas (2022)
- Escape from Love (2023)
- Reptile (2023)
- The Rivals of Amziah King (2026)
- Heartland (2026)
