= Till (film) =

2022 film by Chinonye Chukwu

- Theatrical release poster
- Directed by: Chinonye Chukwu
- Written by: Michael Reilly; Keith Beauchamp; Chinonye Chukwu
- Produced by: Keith Beauchamp; Barbara Broccoli; Whoopi Goldberg; Thomas Levine; Michael Reilly; Frederick Zollo
- Starring: Danielle Deadwyler; Jalyn Hall; Frankie Faison; Haley Bennett; Whoopi Goldberg
- Cinematography: Bobby Bukowski
- Edited by: Ron Patane
- Music by: Abel Korzeniowski
- Production companies: Orion Pictures; Eon Productions; Frederick Zollo Productions
- Distributed by: United Artists Releasing (United States); Universal Pictures (United Kingdom and Ireland)
- Release dates: October 1, 2022 (NYFF); October 14, 2022 (United States); January 6, 2023 (United Kingdom)
- Running time: 130 minutes
- Countries: United Kingdom; United States
- Language: English
- Budget: $20 million
- Box office: $11.5 million

Till is a 2022 biographical drama film directed by Chinonye Chukwu and written by Michael Reilly, Keith Beauchamp, and Chukwu, and produced by Beauchamp, Reilly, and Whoopi Goldberg. It is based on the true story of Mamie Till, an educator and activist who pursued justice after the murder of her 14-year-old son Emmett in August 1955. The film stars Danielle Deadwyler as Mamie and Jalyn Hall as Emmett. Kevin Carroll, Frankie Faison, Haley Bennett, Jayme Lawson, Tosin Cole, Sean Patrick Thomas, John Douglas Thompson, Roger Guenveur Smith, and Goldberg also appear in supporting roles.

The film was officially announced in August 2020, though a project about Emmett Till's murder had been in the works for several years prior. Much of the main cast joined the following summer, and filming took place in Taylorsville and Cartersville in Georgia, and surrounding cities and towns inside Bartow County, Georgia, that fall. It is the second major media property based on Mamie Till to be released in 2022, following the television series Women of the Movement. The film is dedicated in memory of Mamie Till's life and legacy and its release coincided with the October 2022 unveiling of a statue in Emmett Till's memory in Greenwood, Mississippi.

Till had its world premiere at the New York Film Festival on October 1, 2022, was theatrically released in the United States on October 14, 2022, by United Artists Releasing, and was released in the United Kingdom on January 6, 2023, by Universal Pictures. The film received critical acclaim, particularly for Deadwyler's performance, and was named one of the best films of 2022 by the National Board of Review. For her performance, Deadwyler received several awards, including nominations for the BAFTA, Critics' Choice and SAG Award for Best Actress. It grossed $11 million against a production budget of $20 million.

== Plot ==
In August 1955, 14-year-old Emmett Till lives with his mother, Mamie, in Chicago, Illinois. As Emmett leaves to visit relatives in Money, Mississippi, Mamie warns him to be cautious around white people. At a train station, the two meet with Mamie's uncle, Moses "Preacher" Wright, and Emmett's cousin, Wheeler Parker. After spending a day picking cotton on a plantation that uses sharecropping, Emmett and his cousins purchase candy at a local store. Emmett remarks to Carolyn Bryant, a white woman, that she looks like a movie star. She follows him outside, where he whistles at her. Disgusted, Carolyn grabs a revolver as the boys flee.

In the early hours of August 28, Carolyn's husband, Roy, and his half-brother, John William "J. W." Milam, break into the Wrights' house and kidnap Emmett. Ignoring the family's pleas, the Bryants drive off into the night. Emmett is tortured, beaten, and shot in the head, with his body dumped into the Tallahatchie River.

Back in Chicago, Mamie is informed of Emmett's kidnapping. Her cousin, Rayfield Mooty, arranges her to meet with William Huff, the counsel for the NAACP chapter in Chicago. At his office, Huff inquires about Mamie's past marriages as her personal history will be questioned. Meanwhile, the police locate Emmett's body along the river. Upon hearing the news, Mamie collapses in anguish. Despite Mooty's reservations, Mamie asks for Emmett's body to be transferred back to Chicago. After seeing her son's mutilated corpse, Mamie arranges for an open casket funeral to show the world what has been done to Emmett.

Milam and Bryant are charged for their actions in relation to Till's killing. Accompanied by her father, Mamie travels to Mound Bayou to help represent Emmett for the trial. At the Regional Council, headed by T. R. M. Howard, Howard asks Mamie to consider her future after the trial as her activism can help galvanize federal support for voting rights toward Black Americans. On the first day of the trial, the defense team requests a recess after learning of another witness, to which the judge agrees and adjourns.

During the recess, the prosecution locates Willie Reed, who was an eyewitness to Till's killing. The next day, Wright and Reed give their testimonies, and the former identifies Milam as the culprit who held his family at gunpoint. Next, Mamie goes before the trial, testifying she could identify the corpse as her son. The defense then cross-examines Mamie, as she had told the "colored press" she warned Emmett on how to conduct himself in Mississippi. On the witness stand, Carolyn Bryant presents a fabricated testimony that Emmett grabbed her by the waist and said he had previous interracial romances. Angered, Mamie leaves the courtroom sure that she already knows the verdict.

After an hour, the all-white Mississippi jury acquits Milam and Bryant of Till's killing. Later, at an NAACP rally in Harlem, Mamie criticizes the Mississippi criminal justice system for victim blaming and the United States for failing in its promise for equal justice. She returns home and fondly remembers Emmett as she imagines him in his room.

The post-credits state that Mamie's actions galvanized the Civil Rights Act of 1957. She dedicated her life to teaching children while continuing to fight for civil rights in America.

== Cast ==
- Danielle Deadwyler as Mamie Till-Mobley
- Jalyn Hall as Emmett "Bobo" Till, Mamie's deceased son.
- Kevin Carroll as Rayfield Mooty, a member of Civil Rights activism organization NAACP.
- Frankie Faison as John Carthan, Mamie's father and Emmett's grandfather.
- Haley Bennett as Carolyn Bryant, a 21-year-old Southern shopkeeper whose accusations led to Emmett's murder.
- Jayme Lawson as Myrlie Evers, an NAACP member and Medgar Evers's wife.
- Tosin Cole as Medgar Evers, an NAACP member and Myrlie's husband.
- Sean Patrick Thomas as Gene Mobley, Mamie's boyfriend and eventual husband who is also a father figure to Emmett.
- John Douglas Thompson as Mose "Preacher" Wright, Emmett's uncle and Elizabeth's husband.
- Roger Guenveur Smith as T. R. M. Howard, the head of the Regional Council.
- Whoopi Goldberg as Alma Carthan, Mamie's mother and Emmett's grandmother.
- Keisha Tillis as Elizabeth Wright, Emmett's aunt and Mose's wife.
- Marc Collins as Wheeler Parker, Emmett's oldest cousin.
- Diallo Thompson as Maurice Wright, Emmett's cousin.
- Tyrik Johnson as Simeon "Simmy" Wright, Emmett's youngest cousin.
- Keith Arthur Bolden as William Huff, the leader of the NAACP chapter in Chicago.
- Darian Rolle as Willie Reed, a black man who was an eyewitness to Emmett's murder.
- Sean Michael Weber as Roy Bryant, Carolyn's husband and one of the men who kidnapped and murdered Emmett.
- Eric Whitten as John William "J.W." Milam, Roy's half-brother and one of the men who kidnapped and murdered Emmett.

== Production ==
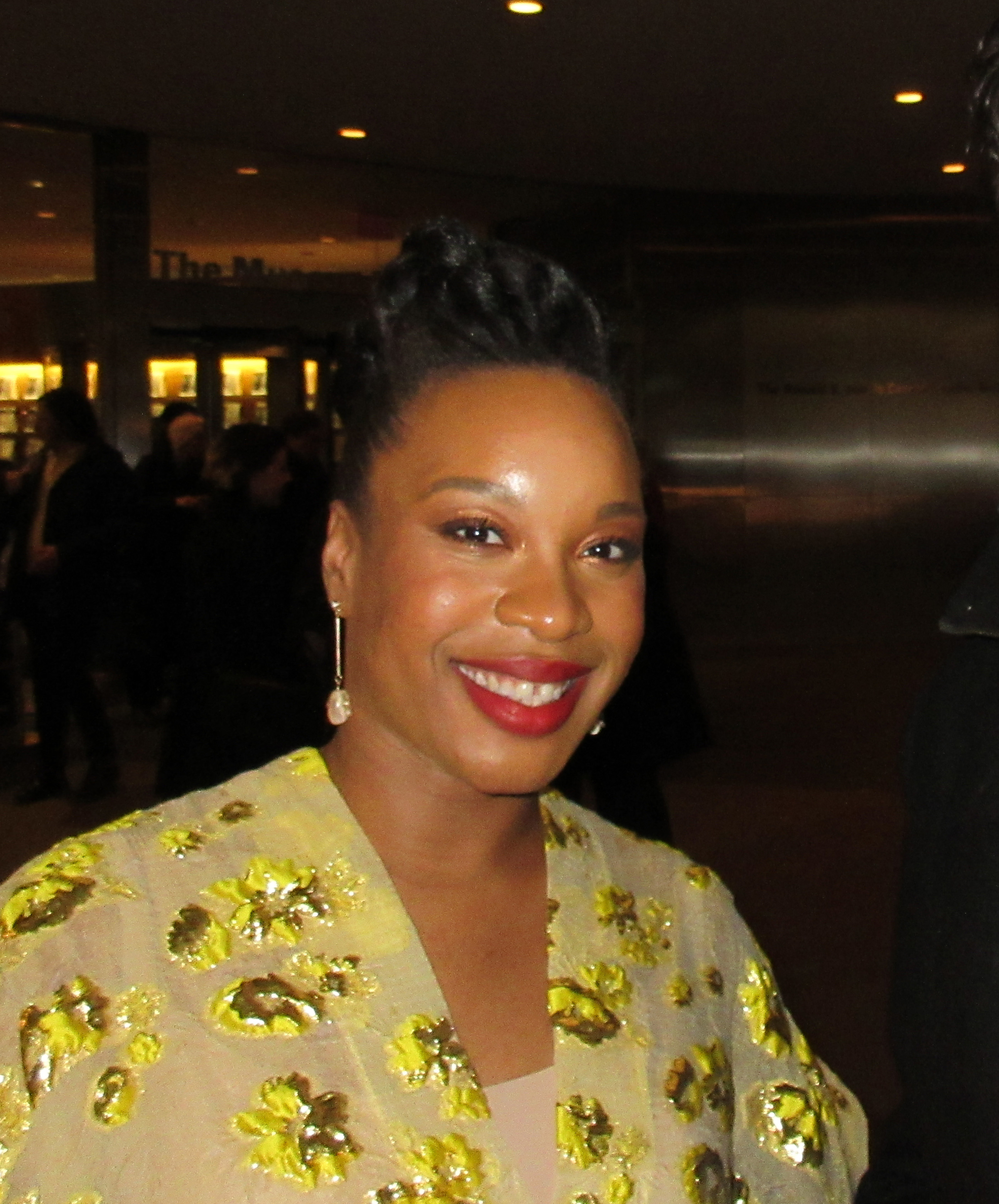
Writer and director Chinonye Chukwu

On August 27, 2020, it was announced that Chinonye Chukwu would write and direct a feature film based on the life of Mamie Till-Mobley and her fight for justice after the lynching of her 14-year-son, Emmett Till. Produced by MGM's Orion Pictures, the film uses 27 years' worth of research by Keith Beauchamp, whose efforts led to the reopening of Till's case by the United States Department of Justice in 2004. Simeon Wright, Till's cousin and an eyewitness of the event, served as a consultant to the project until his death in 2017. Chukwu's screenplay is based on a draft she previously co-wrote with Beauchamp and producer Michael Reilly. In July 2021, Danielle Deadwyler and Whoopi Goldberg joined the cast. Jalyn Hall was cast as Emmett Till that August. Filming began in Bartow County, Georgia, in September 2021. By the end of the year, Frankie Faison, Jayme Lawson, Tosin Cole, Kevin Carroll, Sean Patrick Thomas, John Douglas Thompson, Roger Guenveur Smith, and Haley Bennett were confirmed to star.

During post-production, the musical score was composed by Abel Korzeniowski.

== Release ==
The film received a limited release in the United States on October 14, 2022, and Canada on October 21, 2022, before a wide release on October 28, 2022, by United Artists Releasing under the Orion Pictures label. Outside of the US, it was distributed by Universal Pictures in several countries, including its release in the United Kingdom on January 6, 2023. The film premiered at the New York Film Festival on October 1, 2022, and was screened at the 66th BFI London Film Festival on October 15, 2022, and at the 31st Philadelphia Film Festival that same month. The distributor also invited high school students to special screenings of the film in New York's Alice Tully Hall; showings of the film and questionnaires with the filmmakers were simultaneously shared online. The film was also screened for US President and First Lady Joe and Jill Biden at the White House in Washington, D.C., on February 16, 2023.

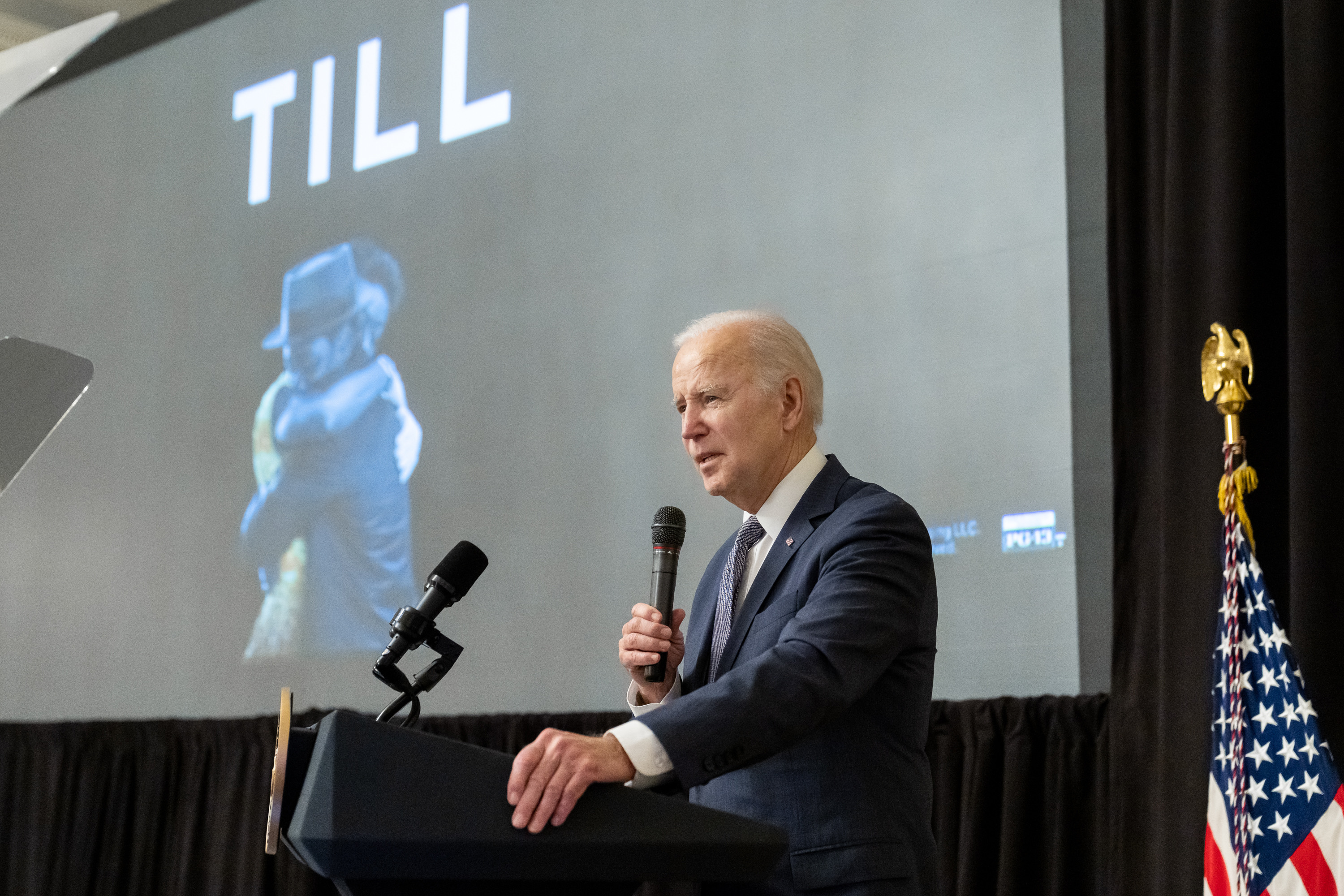
US President Joe Biden at a viewing of Till at The White House on February 16, 2023.

Till is the second last film by United Artists Releasing under the banner of Orion Pictures, following the shutdown of the predecessor company by Amazon Studios due to the lack of box office like Bones and All and Women Talking (also being the last film) as a result of general public no longer supporting prestige films released during the late-2022 awards season period, and the decision of the Amazon Studios' Air in theatres in 2023 following the 96th Academy Awards buzz. Women Talking is also a last film following the Amazon's acquisition of Orion Pictures.

The film was released for VOD platforms on November 22, 2022, followed by a Blu-ray and DVD release on January 17, 2023.

== Reception ==
=== Box office ===
In the United States and Canada, the film made $242,269 from 16 theaters in its opening weekend. It held this record as the highest platform release opening of the year until The Whale two months later. In its second weekend the film made $363,541 from 104 theaters. Expanding to 2,058 theaters in its third weekend, the film made $1.03 million on its first day and would go on to gross $2.7 million over the weekend, finishing sixth. In its second weekend of wide release the film made $1.88 million (marking a drop of 32%). Variety attributed these results to the general public showing the early stages of refusal to see and support prestige films in theaters in a moviegoing environment altered by the COVID-19 pandemic, along with the possibility that the film's subject matter may have been seen as uncomfortable for audiences to handle.

=== Critical response ===
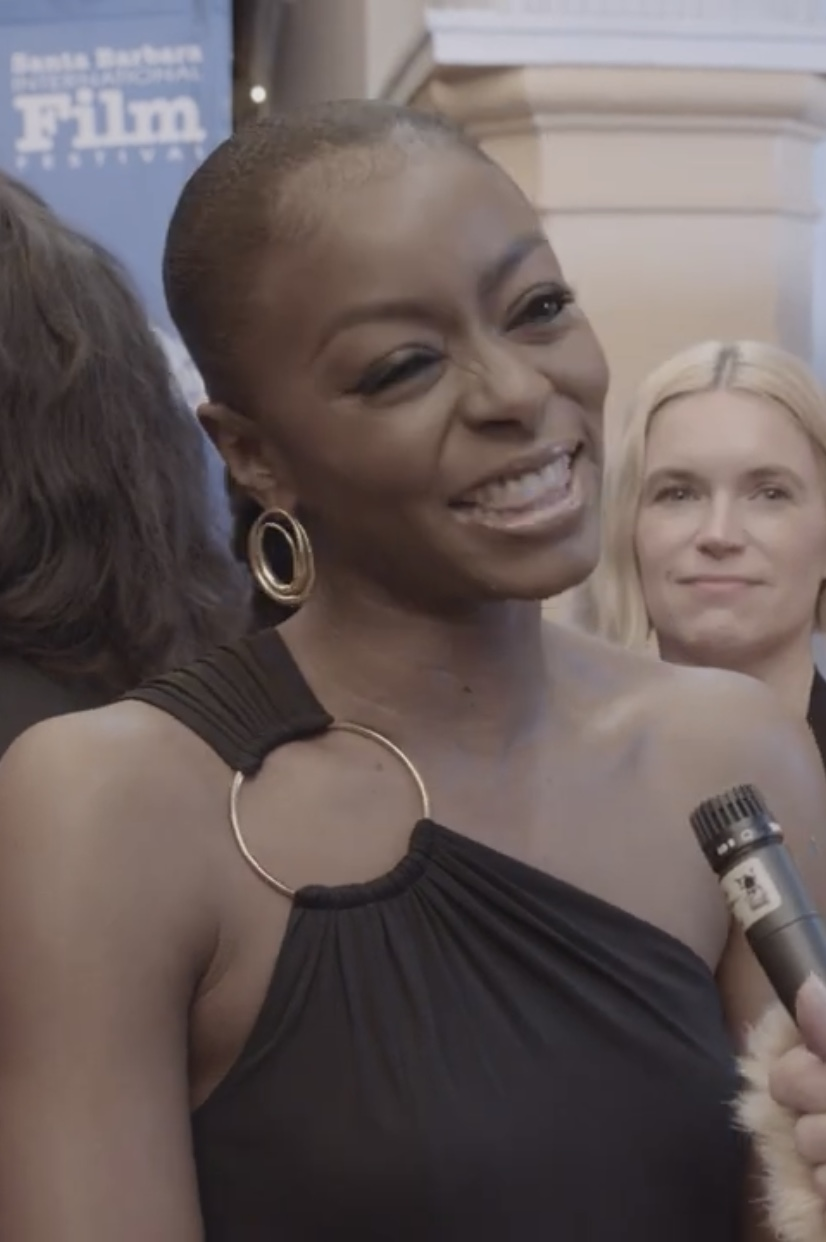
Danielle Deadwyler's performance as Mamie Till garnered widespread acclaim.

On the review aggregator website Rotten Tomatoes, 96% of 195 critics' reviews are positive, with an average rating of 7.9/10. The website's consensus reads: "Till reframes an historically horrific murder within a mother's grief, brought heartwrenchingly to life by Danielle Deadwyler's tremendous performance." Metacritic, which uses a weighted average, assigned the film a score of 77 out of 100, based on 48 critics, indicating "generally favorable" reviews. Audiences polled by CinemaScore gave the film a rare average grade of "A+", and those at PostTrak gave the film a 91% overall positive score, with 87% saying they definitely would recommend it.

Michael O'Sullivan of The Washington Post gave the film four complete stars, writing: "It's Deadwyler who holds our attention—our gaze and our hearts—and who does so with a masterful control. Even at Mamie's most shattered, an inextinguishable ember of courage and purpose seems to smolder at the core of the character." Peter Travers of ABC News felt Till "is more than a movie—it's essential viewing." He further praised Deadwyler's performance, writing she "is too good to let a movie turn Black trauma into cheesy Oscar bait. Even when the film lets conventional biopic tropes mess with momentum, Deadwyler never loses her uncanny connection to the female warrior she's playing." Manohla Dargis of The New York Times highlighted Chukwa's fixed focus on Mamie Till, to which she also praised Deadwyler for "delivering a quiet, centralizing performance that works contrapuntally with the story's heaviness, its profundity and violence."

Michael Phillips of the Chicago Tribune also noted Chukwa's direction and Deadwyler's performance, but felt more screen time was needed to justify "Mamie's transformation from relatively apolitical Chicagoan to an urgently engaged citizen of a wider world." Richard Brody of The New Yorker stated the film "is a work of mighty cinematic portraiture, with a range of closeups of Mamie that infuse the film with an overwhelming combination of subjective depth and an outward sense of purpose. These images depend for that vast spectrum of feeling upon Deadwyler's performance, one of the most radiantly, resonantly expressive to grace the screen this year." Brian Lowry of CNN felt there's "a difficult-to-avoid aspect to the production that can't entirely escape a movie-of-the-week feel," but nevertheless wrote: "Anchored by Danielle Deadwyler's towering performance, it's a wrenching portrayal of reluctant heroism under the most horrific of parental circumstances."

Peter Debruge of Variety wrote: "It would take a tough constitution not to be moved by Till, although that doesn't necessarily make it great drama ... Chukwu's first wish is clearly not to re-victimize Emmett Till, but in eliding such details and avoiding the torture, Chukwu relies perhaps too much on our imagination." Kate Erbland, reviewing on the website Indiewire, gave the film a mixed response: "While Deadwyler turns in a remarkable performance as Mamie, beautifully calibrating her love and anger in one riveting package, the rest of Till is prone to trope-ridden, predictable sequences that do little to advance her story or Emmett's legacy."

=== Accolades ===
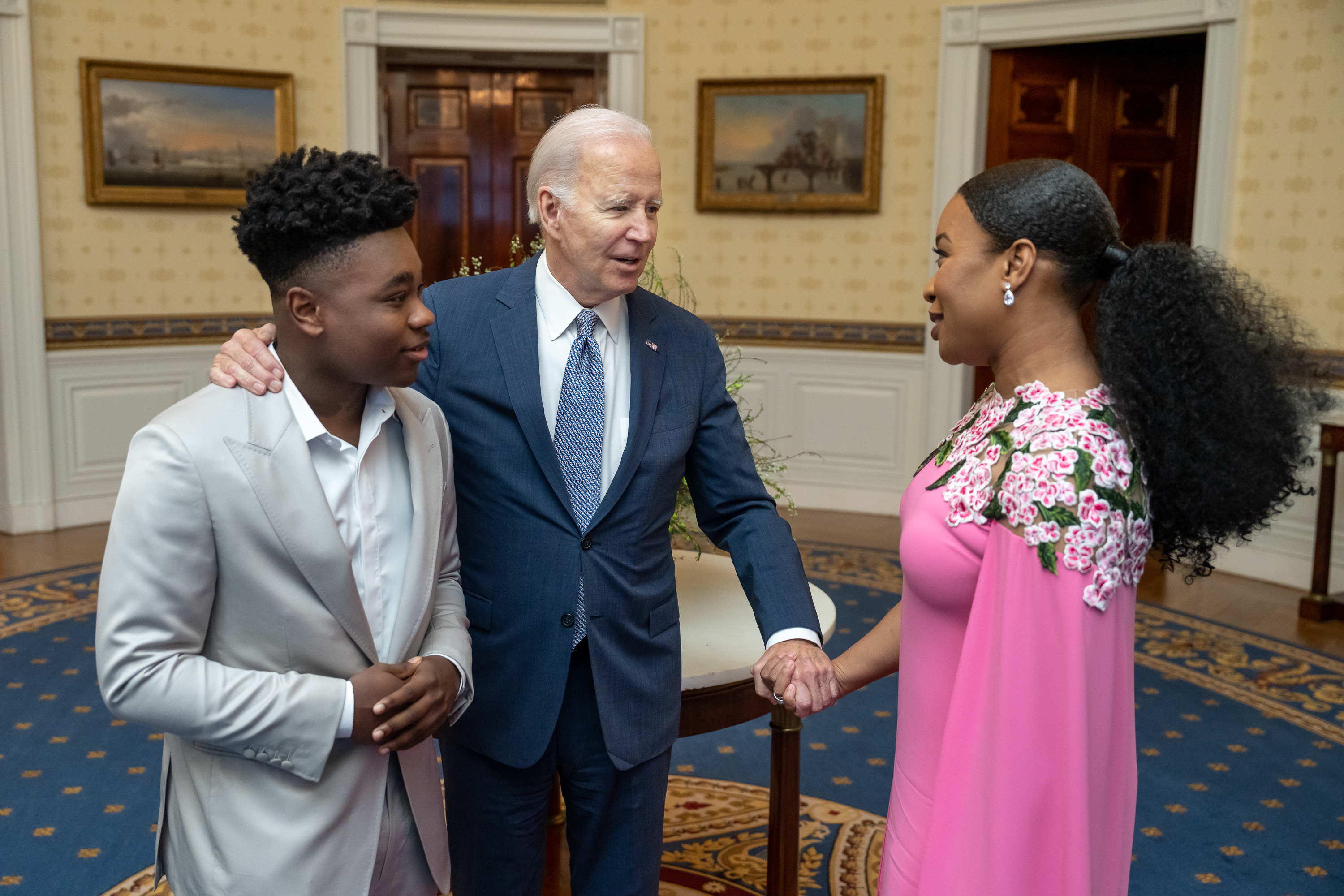
President Joe Biden greets cast members Jalyn Hall and Chukwu before a screening of the movie Till on February 16, 2023, in the Blue Room of the White House

Despite receiving nominations in several other ceremonies, Deadwyler was controversially not nominated for an Academy Award for Best Actress at the 95th Academy Awards, prompting Chukwu to criticise the film industry for "upholding whiteness and perpetuating an unabashed misogyny towards Black women". In the wake of this decision, widely considered a snub, film critic Robert Daniels of the Los Angeles Times lamented on how the film industry at large fails Black women, with the lack of a nomination for Deadwyler or Viola Davis in The Woman King serving to exemplify this.

Award	Date of ceremony	Category	Recipient(s)	Result	Ref.
Hollywood Music in Media Awards	November 16, 2022	Best Original Score in a Feature Film	Abel Korzeniowski	Nominated	
Hollywood Music in Media Awards	November 16, 2022	Best Original Song in a Feature Film	Jasmine Sullivan and D'Mile ("Stand Up")	Nominated	
Gotham Independent Film Awards	November 28, 2022	Outstanding Lead Performance	Danielle Deadwyler	Won	
National Board of Review	December 8, 2022	Top Ten Films	Till	Won	
National Board of Review	December 8, 2022	Best Breakthrough Performance	Danielle Deadwyler	Won^{1}	
Los Angeles Film Critics Association	December 11, 2022	Best Lead Performance	Danielle Deadwyler	Runner-up	
Washington D.C. Area Film Critics Association	December 12, 2022	Best Actress	Danielle Deadwyler	Nominated	
Washington D.C. Area Film Critics Association	December 12, 2022	Best Youth Performance	Jalyn Hall	Nominated	
Chicago Film Critics Association	December 14, 2022	Most Promising Performer	Danielle Deadwyler	Nominated	
St. Louis Gateway Film Critics Association	December 18, 2022	Best Actress	Danielle Deadwyler	Nominated	
Dallas–Fort Worth Film Critics Association	December 19, 2022	Best Actress	Danielle Deadwyler	4th place	
Florida Film Critics Circle	December 22, 2022	Best Actress	Danielle Deadwyler	Nominated	
Alliance of Women Film Journalists	January 5, 2023	Best Actress	Danielle Deadwyler	Nominated	
Alliance of Women Film Journalists	January 5, 2023	Most Daring Performance	Danielle Deadwyler	Nominated	
Alliance of Women Film Journalists	January 5, 2023	Best Woman's Breakthrough Performance	Danielle Deadwyler	Won	
Alliance of Women Film Journalists	January 5, 2023	Best Woman Director	Chinoye Chukwu	Nominated	
San Diego Film Critics Society	January 6, 2023	Best Actress	Danielle Deadwyler	Won	
San Diego Film Critics Society	January 6, 2023	Best Breakthrough Artist	Danielle Deadwyler	Runner-up	
San Diego Film Critics Society	January 6, 2023	Best Original Screenplay	Keith Beauchamp, Chinonye Chukwu and Michael Reilly	Nominated	
San Diego Film Critics Society	January 6, 2023	Best Youth Performance	Jalyn Hall	Runner-up	
Toronto Film Critics Association	January 8, 2023	Best Actress	Danielle Deadwyler	Runner-up	
San Francisco Bay Area Film Critics Circle	January 9, 2023	Best Actress	Danielle Deadwyler	Nominated	
Austin Film Critics Association	January 10, 2023	Best Actress	Danielle Deadwyler	Nominated	
Georgia Film Critics Association	January 13, 2023	Best Actress	Danielle Deadwyler	Nominated	
Georgia Film Critics Association	January 13, 2023	Oglethorpe Award for Excellence in Georgia Cinema	Chinonye Chukwu, Michael Reilly, Keith Beauchamp	Won	
Critics' Choice Awards	January 15, 2023	Best Actress	Danielle Deadwyler	Nominated	
Critics' Choice Awards	January 15, 2023	Best Young Performer	Jalyn Hall	Nominated	
Seattle Film Critics Society	January 17, 2023	Best Actress in a Leading Role	Danielle Deadwyler	Nominated	
Online Film Critics Society	January 23, 2023	Best Actress	Danielle Deadwyler	Nominated	
AARP Movies for Grownups Awards	January 28, 2023	Best Intergenerational Film	Chinonye Chukwu	Won	
AARP Movies for Grownups Awards	January 28, 2023	Best Time Capsule	Chinonye Chukwu	Nominated	
Black Reel Awards	February 6, 2023	Outstanding Motion Picture	Keith Beauchamp, Barbara Broccoli, Whoopi Goldberg, Michael Reilly and Thomas Levine	Nominated	
Black Reel Awards	February 6, 2023	Outstanding Director	Chinonye Chukwu	Nominated	
Black Reel Awards	February 6, 2023	Outstanding Actress	Danielle Deadwyler	Won	
Black Reel Awards	February 6, 2023	Outstanding Breakthrough Performance, Male	Jalyn Hall	Nominated	
Black Reel Awards	February 6, 2023	Outstanding Screenplay	Keith Beauchamp, Michael Reilly, Chinonye Chukwu	Won	
Black Reel Awards	February 6, 2023	Outstanding Original Song	"Stand Up"	Nominated	
Black Reel Awards	February 6, 2023	Outstanding Cinematography	Bobby Bukowski	Nominated	
Black Reel Awards	February 6, 2023	Outstanding Costume Design	Marci Rodgers	Nominated	
Black Reel Awards	February 6, 2023	Outstanding Ensemble	Till	Nominated	
Black Reel Awards	February 6, 2023	Outstanding Soundtrack	Till	Nominated	
Black Reel Awards	February 6, 2023	Outstanding Production Design	Curtis Beech	Nominated	
Make-Up Artists and Hair Stylists Guild	February 11, 2023	Best Period Hair Styling and/or Character Hair Styling in a Feature-Length Motion Picture	Denise Tunnell, Janice Tunnell, Ashley Langston	Nominated	
Satellite Awards	March 3, 2023	Best Motion Picture – Drama	Till	Nominated	
Satellite Awards	March 3, 2023	Best Actress in a Motion Picture – Drama	Danielle Deadwyler	Won	
Houston Film Critics Society	February 18, 2023	Best Picture	Till	Nominated	
Houston Film Critics Society	February 18, 2023	Best Actress	Danielle Deadwyler	Nominated	
Houston Film Critics Society	February 18, 2023	Best Original Song	"Stand Up"	Nominated	
British Academy Film Awards	February 19, 2023	Best Actress in a Leading Role	Danielle Deadwyler	Nominated	
Hollywood Critics Association Awards	February 24, 2023	Best Actress	Danielle Deadwyler	Nominated	
Screen Actors Guild Award	February 26, 2023	Outstanding Performance by a Female Actor in a Leading Role	Danielle Deadwyler	Nominated	
NAACP Image Awards	February 25, 2023	Outstanding Motion Picture	Till	Nominated	
NAACP Image Awards	February 25, 2023	Outstanding Directing in a Motion Picture	Chinonye Chukwu	Nominated	
NAACP Image Awards	February 25, 2023	Outstanding Actress in a Motion Picture	Danielle Deadwyler	Nominated	
NAACP Image Awards	February 25, 2023	Outstanding Supporting Actor in a Motion Picture	Jalyn Hall	Won	
Denver Film Critics Society	January 16, 2023	Best Actress	Danielle Deadwyler	Nominated	

- ^1 – Shared with Gabriel LaBelle for The Fabelmans.

== See also ==
- Emmett Till
- 1956 Sugar Bowl
- Civil rights movement
- Civil rights movement in popular culture
- Women of the Movement, television series also released in 2022
