= The Saviors =

American comedic thriller film

- Directed by: Kevin Hamedani
- Screenplay by: Kevin Hamedani; Travis Betz
- Produced by: Adam Scott; Naomi Scott; Dan Gedman; Matt Smith; Nicky Weinstock; Divya D’Souza; Bradley Gallo; Michael Helfant
- Starring: Adam Scott; Danielle Deadwyler; Ron Perlman; Colleen Camp; Greg Kinnear
- Cinematography: Jon Keng
- Edited by: Ben Baudhin; Tom McArdle
- Music by: Nick Shadel; Kyle O'Quin
- Production companies: Highway 10; Great Scott Productions; Invention Studios; Amasia Entertainment
- Distributed by: Vertical
- Release dates: March 13, 2026 (SXSW); March 26, 2027 (United States)
- Running time: 90 minutes
- Country: United States
- Language: English

The Saviors is a 2026 American dark comedy thriller film directed by Kevin Hamedani. It is starring Adam Scott, Danielle Deadwyler, Ron Perlman, Colleen Camp and Greg Kinnear.

The film premiered at the 2026 South by Southwest Film & TV Festival in the Narrative Spotlight on March 13, 2026. It is set to be released on March 26, 2027 by Vertical.

== Premise ==
A suburban couple's life spirals out of control when they rent out their garage to mysterious tenants.

== Cast ==
- Adam Scott as Sean Harrison
- Danielle Deadwyler as Kim Harrison
- Ron Perlman as Mr. Harrison
- Colleen Camp as Mrs. Harrison
- Greg Kinnear as Jim Clemente
- Kate Berlant as Cleo
- Theo Rossi as Amir
- Nazanin Boniadi as Jahan
- Daveed Diggs

== Production ==
Kevin Hamedani is the director of the film from a script he co-wrote with Travis Betz. The script was featured on the Black List in 2017 of the "most liked" scripts currently not in production. Matt Smith and Dan Gedman of Highway 10 are producers, alongside Adam Scott and Naomi Scott on behalf of Great Scott Productions, Nicholas Weinstock and Divya D’Souza for Invention Studios, and Bradley Gallo and Michael Helfant with Amasia Entertainment. Adam Scott and Danielle Deadwyler lead the cast with Deadwyler also an executive producer. The cast also includes Greg Kinnear, Kate Berlant, Theo Rossi, Nazanin Boniadi, Ron Perlman, Colleen Camp. Principal photography was completed in Los Angeles in December 2024.

== Release ==
The Saviors premiered at the 2026 South by Southwest Film & TV Festival in the Narrative Spotlight on March 13, 2026. It will be screened in Panorama section of the 59th Sitges Film Festival in October 2026. It is set to be released on March 26, 2027 by Vertical.

== Reception ==
The film earned an 80% on Rotten Tomatoes, with many critics praising the performances and noting how Hamedani's storytelling reflects issues plaguing America, such as racism and Islamophobia. Others compared the production to cultural staples like The Twilight Zone and The Burbs.

BJ Colangelo of /Film wrote, "The purposefully uncomfortable comedy evokes Joe Dante's cult classic, The 'Burbs, but it's the film's final moments that push it well into The Twilight Zone for the modern age."
