= An Actor Prepares (film) =

- Theatrical release poster
- Directed by: Steve Clark
- Screenplay by: Steve Clark; Thomas Moffett
- Produced by: David M. Rosenthal; Tom Lassally; Will Rowbotham
- Starring: Jeremy Irons; Jack Huston; Mamie Gummer; Ben Schwartz
- Production company: Pandemic Film
- Distributed by: Gravitas Ventures
- Release date: August 31, 2018 (United States)
- Running time: 97 minutes
- Language: English

An Actor Prepares 2018 is a comedy film directed by Steve Clark and written by Clark and Thomas Moffett. The film stars Jeremy Irons, Jack Huston, Mamie Gummer, Ben Schwartz, Matthew Modine, and Frankie Faison. It was released on August 31, 2018, by Gravitas Ventures.

== Premise ==
When Atticus Smith, an aging Oscar-winning actor, suffers a heart attack, he is forced to embark on a cross-country road trip with his estranged son en route to his daughter's wedding. Atticus and his son Adam could not be more different; while the former behaves lecherously around women, the latter teaches a feminist-themed university course and is repulsed by his father's attitudes. Part of Adam's resentment towards his father stems from Atticus’ unfaithfulness to his mother. Along the road trip, the pair encounter various characters and get roped into misadventures, including a run-in with an old flame of Atticus’.

== Cast ==
- Jeremy Irons as Atticus Smith
- Jack Huston as Adam
- Mamie Gummer as Annabelle
- Ben Schwartz as Jimmy
- Matthew Modine as Charlie
- Frankie Faison as Deacon Frank Dodge
- Whitney Goin as Adela Dodge
- Will Patton as Wisdom
- Megalyn Echikunwoke as Clementine
- Larry Pine as Jack Dorner
- Colby Minifie as Danielle
- Danielle Lyn as Nicole
- Catherine Dyer as Dorothea

== Reception ==
Matt Fagerholm of RogerEbert.com reviewed the film negatively, opining that the film's humor felt particularly off-putting in the age of MeToo. Though he wrote Irons "certainly appears to be relishing his role as an unapologetically bad-mannered actor, savoring each profane syllable of his dialogue like a fine wine", he noted "the script’s lethal miscalculation is the mean-spiritedness of its humor." Fagerholm added, "If Adam—and the film itself—truly cared about issues such as gender representation, then the character would’ve challenged his father’s sexist beliefs, engaging in provocative debates as they journey across the country on their road trip. Instead, the film wants us to chortle at Atticus doing lewd and outrageous things that we’ve seen in countless other pictures."

Frank Scheck of The Hollywood Reporter voiced similar thoughts, writing "Although his performance is undeniably entertaining at times, Irons is ultimately defeated by his character’s cliched aspects which include revealing himself to be a (no spoiler alert) loving and proud father after all. Huston’s natural charisma is given little chance to shine, with Adam being mainly reactive to his father’s outrageousness."
