= The Devil to Pay (2019 film) =

- Directed by: Ruckus and Lane Skye
- Produced by: Ruckus Skye; Lane Skye; Danielle Deadwyler; Martin L. Kelley; Allison Maier
- Starring: Danielle Deadwyler; Adam Boyer; Jayson Warner Smith; Brad Carter; Catherine Dyer; Luce Rains
- Cinematography: Sherman Johnson
- Edited by: Ruckus Skye
- Music by: Brad Carter
- Production companies: Crooked Crow Films; Buckhead Film Group
- Distributed by: Dark Star Pictures
- Release dates: April 7, 2019 (Atlanta Film Festival); October 2, 2020 (United States)
- Running time: 87 minutes
- Country: United States
- Language: English

The Devil to Pay is a 2019 American independent thriller film written and directed by the husband and wife team of Ruckus Skye and Lane Skye (in their film debut) and starring Danielle Deadwyler as a struggling mother who must protect her son after the disappearance of her husband forces her to face off with the most powerful family on the mountain headed up by matriarch Tommy Runion (Catherine Dyer).

The film premiered at the 2019 Atlanta Film Festival and was released in selected theaters and domestic streaming on October 2, 2020. It was released internationally in January 2022 on digital platforms. The Devil to Pay received positive reviews from critics for Skye's debut and Deadwyler's lead performance.

== Plot ==
The Devil to Pay’ opens at a small house on an Appalachian mountain where Lemon Cassidy lives with her son, Coy. Her husband, Tarlee, works for a local landlady Tommy Runion. However, Tarlee is missing for a few days, and Lemon assumes he has gone on one of his benders. As a result, she and Coy are left alone to do the house chores. One day, two men who work for Tommy arrive at Lemon's house. The men reveal that Tommy wants to meet with Lemon. However, they do not allow her to take Coy along. Instead, the men remain at Lemon's house, watching over Coy. Lemon walks to Tommy's house and meets the Runion family matriarch. Tommy explains to Lemon that Tarlee was caught stealing from her. However, Tommy gave Tarlee a chance to repay his debt. She asked him to perform a task for her in exchange for writing off the debt. Nonetheless, Tarlee has gone missing, and Tommy assumes he fled with her money. Therefore, she takes Coy hostage and forces Lemon to complete the task. Lemon has no choice but to work for Tommy as her son's life is in danger. Lemon sets out to search for Tarlee. However, she first stops at Grady's house. He asks her to deliver a jar of sulfuric acid to a religious cult that lives on the outskirts. After providing the jar, Lemon realizes that the cult uses it for torture. Later, Lemon tracks down Tarlee's truck and discovers that his hands were chopped off. She finds a pocket watch in the glove compartment belonging to Percy Knox, Tommy's rival landowner. Lemon collects the pocket watch and hands it over to Tommy. However, she reveals that Tarlee is likely dead from bleeding out.

Tommy explains that Tarlee stole the wrong watch and sends Lemon to Percy's house with Bull, her brother. Lemon tries to forge an alliance at Percy's house by revealing Tommy's plan. Percy reveals that his and Tommy's family have been in a truce for years, and killing a member could lead to a war. However, recently Percy took down a tree planted by Tommy's grandfather after it was struck by lightning, leading to her seeking revenge. Bull intervenes and kills Percy and prepares to blame his death on Lemon. With no help and a target on her back, Lemon must find a way to survive and save her son, forming the rest of the plot. After realizing she has been tricked into doing Tommy's dirty bidding, Lemon makes a run for her life. She creates a distraction and escapes from Bull. However, Lemon knows that the Runions will keep coming after her. Therefore, she lures Bull away from the town and takes him to the cult's land. The religious cult follows a strict no-weapons policy. As a result, when Bull follows Lemon to the cult's land, he is apprehended. The cult's leader punishes Bull for his arrogance and kills him using sulfuric acid. With Bull dead, Lemon returns home to rescue Coy. Lemon strategically targets the men looking after Coy. She uses Bull's truck to lure Wade outside the house. Lemon attacks him with a crowbar. When Wade refuses to stand down, Lemon brutally kills him by smashing his skull. The last remaining member of the Runion gang, Dixon, tries to threaten Lemon. However, she retrieves a gun and forces him to stand down. She asks him to tell Tommy that their deal is over.

If Tommy comes after Coy again, Lemon threatens to raise a Query that could jeopardize Tommy's business. However, Dixon's words convince Lemon that her actions will lead to war. Lemon realizes that Tommy will not spare her. Therefore, she chains Dixon to his brothers' bodies in the grave they had dug for her son, leaving him alive, and heads to confront Tommy. At that house, Tommy tries to talk Lemon out of harming her. However, Lemon shoots Tommy dead. Before leaving town, she stops by Grady's and informs him there will be a war. He also informs her that a body without hands was found by hikers only 15 miles away. She cries and says Tarlee tried his hardest to make it back. She gives Grady a key and tells him she left some loose ends at her house and that it will either end with the key or more dirt, up to him. She alludes to him either letting Dixon free or burying him with the bodies. With all the threats negated, Lemon reunites with her son in a heartwarming moment. Ultimately, Lemon succeeds in protecting her son despite being double-crossed by Tommy. Moreover, Lemon cleverly takes out her enemies and makes the deaths look like a result of a war between the Knox and the Runion factions.

Lemon's actions echo the moral of the story she tells Coy earlier in the film, where a person must do anything necessary to survive as the crooked and evil world will always try to destroy them. Thus, Lemon's story comes full circle as she goes from being a homemaker to a force of fury when her son's life is threatened. The film ends with Lemon using the money she took from Tommy's house to start a new life. Lemon and Coy drive away into the sunset, leaving the carnage behind.

== Cast ==
- Danielle Deadwyler as Lemon Cassidy
- Catherine Dyer as Tommy Runion
- Luce Rains as Percy Knox
- Adam Boyer as Bull Runion
- Jayson Warner Smith as Wade Runion
- Brad Carter as Dixon Runion

== Reception ==
On review aggregator website Rotten Tomatoes, the film holds an approval rating of 90% based on 10 reviews. received positive reviews for her performance. Cath Clarke from The Guardian wrote in her review: "Deadwyler's soulful performance really grounds The Devil to Pay even as it cranks into revenge-movie mode."

The film received GenreBlast Film Festival Jury and Audience Awards for Best Feature Film and Deadwyler received for Best Actress - Feature Film. At the 2019 Nightmares Film Festival, the film won Best Thriller Feature Award, while Deadwyler received Best Actress nomination.
