= Fatwa (2006 film) =

- Directed by: John Carter
- Written by: Scott Schafer
- Produced by: John Carter; Carol Flaisher; Lisa Hagenmeyer (associate producer); Glenn Rigberg (executive producer); Michael Valverde (consulting producer)
- Starring: Lauren Holly; Lacey Chabert; John Doman; Mike Hickey; Angus Macfadyen; Roger Guenveur Smith; Rachel Miner
- Edited by: Dennis M. Hill; Jimmy Hill
- Music by: Eddie Horst (Score Composer); Blake Eiseman (Music Supervisor)
- Distributed by: New Films International (2005) (Non-USA) (all media)
- Release dates: March 24, 2006 (Omaha Film Festival); June 13, 2006 (U.S. DVD)
- Running time: 91 mins.
- Country: United States
- Language: English

Fatwa is a 2006 American dramatic thriller film starring Lauren Holly.

== Plot ==
Junior Senator Maggie Davidson's hard-line anti-terrorism policy makes her the target for a sleeper cell of murderous Jihadist terrorists who plant a dirty bomb at the Mall of America in Bloomington, Minnesota.

== Cast ==
- Lauren Holly as Maggie Davidson
- Lacey Chabert as Noa Goldman
- John Doman as John Davidson
- Roger Guenveur Smith as Samir Al-Faied
- Angus Macfadyen as Bobby
- Rachel Miner as Cassie Davidson
- Jayson Warner Smith as Teacher
