= Storm Reid =

American actress (born 2003)

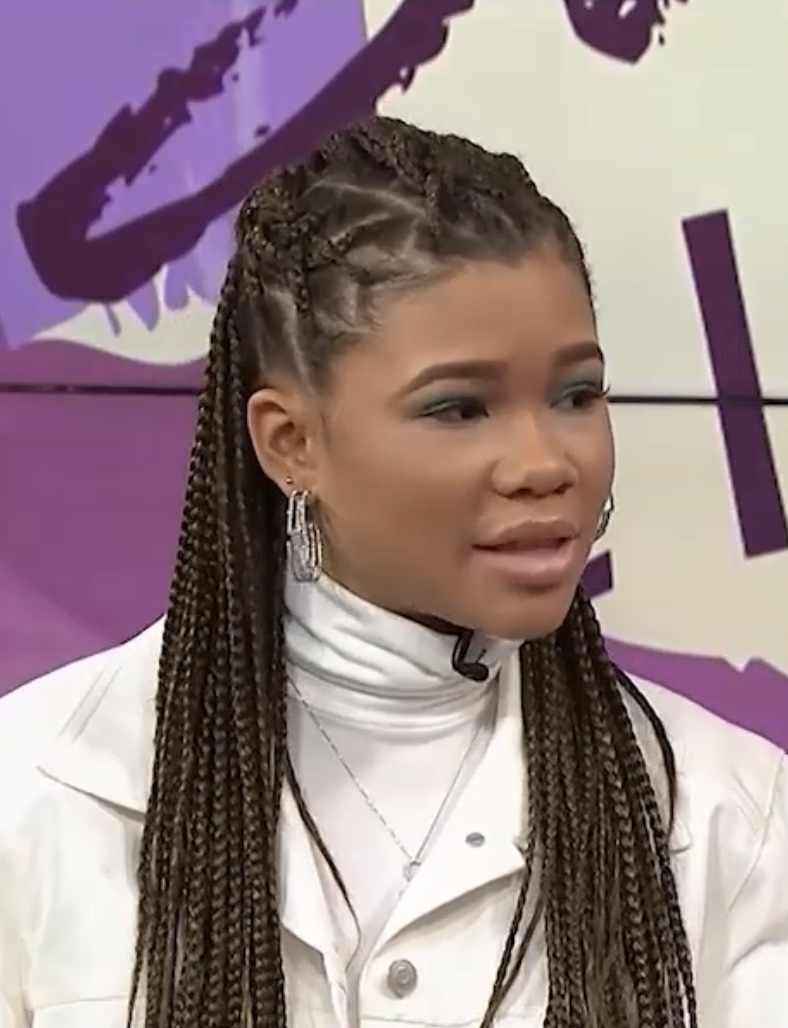
- Reid in 2020
- Born: July 1, 2003 (age 23); Atlanta, Georgia, U.S.
- Education: University of Southern California (B.A.)
- Occupation: Actress
- Years active: 2012–present

Storm Reid (born July 1, 2003) is an American actress. After early roles in the television show A Cross to Bear (2012), the drama film 12 Years a Slave (2013), and the superhero film Sleight (2016), she played the lead role of Meg Murry in the fantasy film A Wrinkle in Time (2018). She garnered further recognition with roles in the thriller film Don't Let Go (2019) and the horror film The Invisible Man (2020).

Reid had supporting roles in the Netflix miniseries When They See Us (2019) and the HBO drama series Euphoria (2019–2022). For playing Riley Abel in the episode "Left Behind" of the drama series The Last of Us (2023), Reid won the Primetime Emmy Award for Outstanding Guest Actress in a Drama Series. She has since played leading roles in the mystery film Missing (2023) and the horror film The Nun II (2023).

== Early life ==
Reid was born on July 1, 2003, in Atlanta, Georgia, to Rodney and Robyn Simpson Reid. She is the youngest of four siblings, which include her brother Josh and two sisters, Iman and Paris. From an early age, Reid aspired to become an actress, and at the age of 9, she and her family moved to Los Angeles for her to pursue acting.

== Career ==
Reid began her professional acting career at a young age, debuting with the television film A Cross To Bear in 2012. In 2013, she starred as Emily in the historical drama film 12 Years a Slave, which received critical acclaim. In 2016, she starred as Tina in the science fiction drama film Sleight, the younger sister of the film's protagonist, Bo. The film was a success, and was received positively. Also in 2016, she starred as Aki in the film Lea to the Rescue, which was part of the American Girl film series.

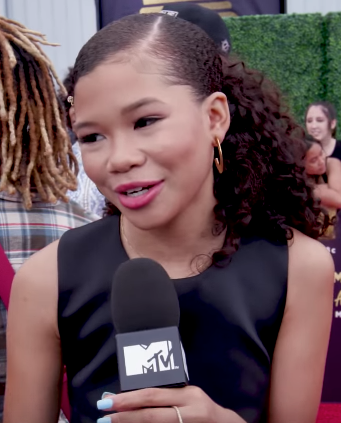
Reid at the MTV Movie & TV Awards in 2018

In 2017, she appeared as Patricia in the comedy-drama film A Happening of Monumental Proportions, which had been received negatively by critics. Better received was her role as Meg Murry in Ava DuVernay's A Wrinkle in Time, which was based on the novel of the same name. In spite of the film emerging as a box-office bomb, Reid's performance earned praise from critics, with some noting her take on the character as a highlight of the film. Writing for The Hollywood Reporter, Josh Spiegel stated that "Reid is one of the film's biggest assets overall; Meg's arc from being crippled by self-doubt to embracing her faults and her dysfunctional family is wonderfully realized through her expressive and subtle work." For the role, she earned a nomination for the Teen Choice Award for Choice Fantasy Movie Actress and the NAACP Image Award for Outstanding Breakthrough Role in a Motion Picture.

In 2019, Reid starred as Lisa in two episodes of the critically acclaimed Netflix limited series When They See Us. and began portraying the main role of Gia Bennett, the younger sister of the series' protagonist Rue Bennett, in the HBO teen drama series Euphoria. That same year, she voiced Nia in the Hulu series The Bravest Knight, and co-starred with David Oyelowo in the drama film Don't Let Go as Ashley, the latter of which earned her and Oyelowo positive reviews. FilmSnobReviews wrote that the pair "bring an emotion-filled performance to the screen, capturing grief and confusion to near perfection."

In 2020, Reid starred as Sydney Lanier, the daughter of James Lanier, in the science fiction horror film The Invisible Man, which was a commercial success and received critical acclaim. In the same year, she was nominated for the BET YoungStars Award. Reid appears in the superhero film The Suicide Squad, which was released in 2021. The following year, she starred opposite Colson Baker, Kevin Bacon and Travis Fimmel in the ensemble action feature One Way.

In 2023, Reid had leading roles in the mystery/thriller film Missing, which was filmed over the COVID-19 pandemic, and the supernatural horror film The Nun II. Also in 2023, she portrayed Riley Abel in the HBO series The Last of Us, appearing in the episode "Left Behind". /Film's Motamayor wrote that Reid "gives a memorable performance that ... sticks with you long after the credits roll", and Push Square's Bayne said she effectively captured Riley's sense of "youthful pride". For her performance, she won the Black Reel Award for Outstanding Guest Performance in a Drama Series and the Primetime Emmy Award for Outstanding Guest Actress in a Drama Series.

== Personal life ==
Reid was previously in a relationship with fellow actor Sayeed Shahidi.

In the fall of 2021, Reid began attending the University of Southern California, majoring in dramatic arts and minoring in African American studies. She graduated in May 2025. She is a Christian.

== Filmography ==
=== Film ===
Year	Title	Role	Notes
2013	12 Years a Slave	Emily	
2015	The Summoning	Kendra	
2016	Sleight	Tina Wolfe	
2016	An American Girl: Lea to the Rescue	Aki	
2016	Santa's Boot Camp	Sparkle	
2017	A Happening of Monumental Proportions	Patricia Crawford	
2018	A Wrinkle in Time	Margaret "Meg" Murry	
2019	Don't Let Go	Ashley Radcliff	
2020	The Invisible Man	Sydney "Sid" Lanier	
2021	The Suicide Squad	Tyla DuBois	
2022	One Way	Rachel	
2023	Missing	June Allen	
2023	The Nun II	Sister Debra	
2026	Roommates	Luna	
2027	Get Lite	TBA	Filming
TBA	Hot Year	TBA	Post-production

=== Television ===
Year	Title	Role	Notes
2012	A Cross to Bear	Young Erica	Television film
2013	The Thundermans	Avery	Episode: "This Looks Like a Job For"
2013	Adam DeVine's House Party	Lady Trooper #3	2 episodes
2013	Twang	Annie Montgomery	Television film
2014	NCIS: Los Angeles	Riley Peyton	Episode: "One More Chance"
2014	Nicky, Ricky, Dicky & Dawn	Scarlett	Episode: "Scaredy Dance"
2015	White Water	Cassandra	Television film
2015	Chicago P.D.	Denise	Episode: "Get Back to Even"
2019	When They See Us	Lisa	2 episodes
2019	The Bravest Knight	Nia (voice)	Main role (season 1)
2019–2022	Euphoria	Gia Bennett	Main role (seasons 1–2)
2023	The Last of Us	Riley Abel	Episode: "Left Behind"
2023	The Proud Family: Louder and Prouder	Emily (voice)	Episode: "Juneteenth"
2024	Is It Cake?	Herself	Episode: "Cake on Fire"

=== Music videos ===
Year	Title	Role	Artist
2017	"Family Feud"		Jay-Z (feat. Beyoncé)

== Awards and nominations ==
Year	Award	Category	Work	Result	Ref.
2018	Teen Choice Awards	Choice Fantasy Movie Actress	A Wrinkle in Time	Nominated	
2019	NAACP Image Awards	Outstanding Breakthrough Role in a Motion Picture	A Wrinkle in Time	Nominated	
2020	BET Awards	YoungStars Award	Herself	Nominated	
2024	Black Reel Awards	Outstanding Guest Performance in a Drama Series	The Last of Us	Won	
2024	People's Choice Awards	The TV Performance of the Year	The Last of Us	Nominated	
2024	Primetime Emmy Awards	Outstanding Guest Actress in a Drama Series	The Last of Us	Won	
