= Jayson Warner Smith =

American actor

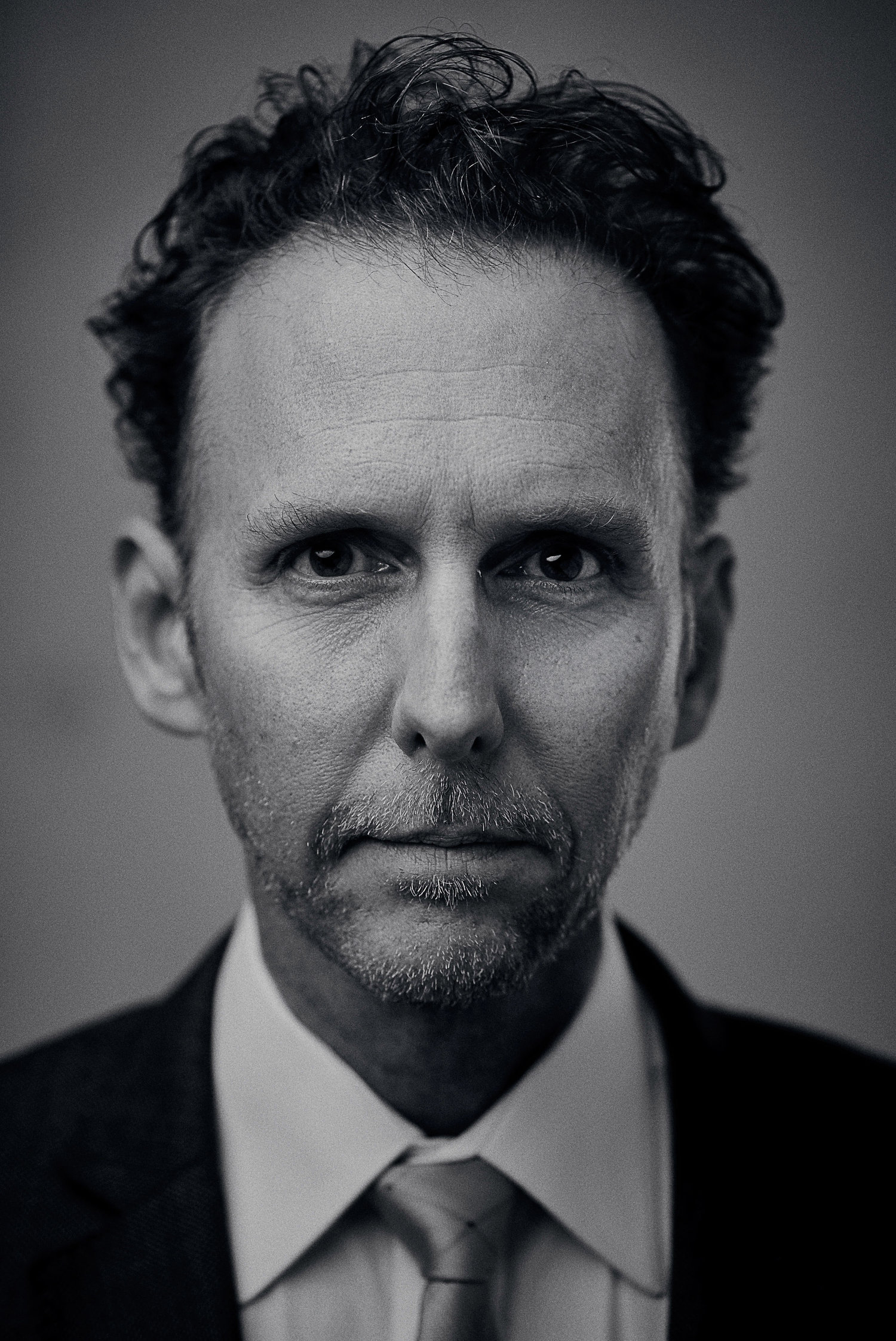
- Born: Atlanta, Georgia, US
- Occupation: Actor
- Years active: 1991–present
- Website: https://www.jaysonsmith.com

Jayson Warner Smith is an American actor who is best known for portraying Gavin in the television series The Walking Dead. He is also known for his role in Rectify as Wendall Jelks and as Dean in The Vampire Diaries.

== Early life and career ==
Smith was born in Atlanta. He started in theatre at age nine. He also teaches acting in Atlanta. In 2010, he finally scored a larger supporting role in a Hollywood film. He has performed in supporting roles in films and TV shows such as the 2011 remake of Footloose, Anchorman II, The Vampire Diaries, 99 Homes, Mississippi Grind, 42, and Fox's Sleepy Hollow.

In addition to those credits, Smith is known for his portrayal of death-row inmate Wendall Jelks on Sundance TV's Rectify. Beginning in 2015, Smith performed in supporting roles in the films The Book of Love, Christine, The Birth of a Nation, and American Made. Atlanta remains his home and he lives in Athens, GA with his wife Lisa. He is best known for portraying Gavin, an antagonistic character from the horror television series The Walking Dead.

== Filmography ==
=== Film ===
Year	Title	Role	Notes
1991	Last Breeze of Summer	School Policeman #2	short
2001	Losing Grace	EMT	
2006	Fatwa	Teacher	
2009	The Way of War	Seven	
2009	The People v. Leo Frank	William Smith / Narrator	
2009	The Joneses	Maitre d'	
2010	Lottery ticket	Maitre d'	uncredited
2011	Footloose	Officer Herb	
2012	Angel of Mercy	Father Clarke	short
2013	42	White Gas Station Attendant	
2013	Anchorman 2: The Legend Continues	Guy with Knife in Head	
2014	Trouble in the Neighborhood	Judd	short
2014	99 Homes	Jeff	
2014	Heavy Water	Mickey	
2015	Mississippi Grind	Clifford	
2015	I Saw the Light	Hank Snow	
2016	Christine	Mitch	
2016	The Book of Love	Uncle Glen	
2016	The Birth of a Nation	Hank Fowler	
2017	American Made	Bill Cooper	Snowbird #1
2017	Thank You for Your Service	VA Receptionist	
2018	All or Nothing	Kirk	
2018	St. Agatha	Mary's Father	
2018	Billionaire Boys Club	Investor	
2019	The Devil to Pay	Wade Runion	
2019	Rest Stop	Mitch Forsyth	Short
2019	Only	Arthur	
2019	Age Difference	Richard	Short
2022	Where the Crawdads Sing	Deputy Joe Purdue	
2023	Chipper	Reese	Short
2023	Sebastian	Fogarty	
2023	Red West (Blood Meridian) tribute	Ex-Priest Tobin	Short
2023	You're Killing Me	Joel Murphy	
2025	Song Sung Blue	Earl/TCB	
2026	Heartland	Owen	
2027	The Rescue	Ed White	

=== Television ===
Year	Title	Role	Notes
1997	Savannah	Delivery Guy	Episode "Every Picture Tells a Story"
2009	Drop Dead Diva	Carl Amuroso	Episode "Crazy"
2009	Tyler Perry's House of Payne	Harold Williams	Episode: "Parental Payne"
2012	Let's Stay Together	Johnny Geter	Episodes: Wait, What? (voice), Creepers
2012	Final Witness	Mark Koponen	TV Documentary, episode: Vixen's Elixir
2013	Sleepy Hollow	Carlton	Episode 8: "Necromancer"
2013	Rectify	Wendall Jelks	8 episodes (2013–2014)
2014	The Vampire Diaries	Dean	2 episodes
2016	NCIS: New Orleans	Payton Kirk	Episode: "Second Chances"
2016	One Mississippi	Dalton Green	Episode: The Cat's Out
2016	The Walking Dead	Gavin	(2016–2017) Season 7: 3 episodes (2017–2018) Season 8: 5 episodes
2018	Queen America	Mr. Cole	3 episodes
2024	Fight Night: The Million Dollar Heist	Police Chief Herbert Turner Jenkins	6 episodes
2024	Murdaugh: Death in the Family	Bruce Dinwiddie (aka Russell Laffitte)	2 episodes
2025	Tulsa King	Walden Eustice	2 episodes
2026	The Good Daughter	Sheriff Keith Coin	4 episodes
