= Keith Beauchamp (filmmaker) =

American filmmaker (born 1971)

Keith A. Beauchamp
- Born: 1971 (age 54–55)
- Occupation: Filmmaker
- Years active: 1997–present
- Known for: The Untold Story of Emmett Louis Till

Keith Beauchamp (born 1971) is an American filmmaker based in Brooklyn and best known for his extensive investigation of and films about the lynching of Emmett Till.

Beauchamp was born in 1971 and grew up in Baton Rouge, Louisiana. He attended Southern University where he studied criminal justice until 1997, when he left the school to pursue a film career in New York City.

Beauchamp began researching and writing for a documentary about the Till case in the late 1990s. He identified and interviewed witnesses and accomplices who were not originally interviewed in the case, and has been credited with building trust and accessing information through these interviews that would not have been otherwise provided to law enforcement officials. Beauchamp worked closely with Till's mother, Mamie Till-Mobley, who became a friend and mentor of his until her death in 2003. The Untold Story of Emmett Louis Till was released in 2005.

Beauchamp's research and advocacy led to the reopening of the Till case in 2004 which was closed again after finding no new evidence. He was approached by the Federal Bureau of Investigation to aid in investigations of other cold case civil rights homicides and produced a series of documentaries about those cases. Most recently, Beauchamp produced and co-wrote Till, a feature film focused on Till-Mobley's story released in October 2022.

== Early life and education ==
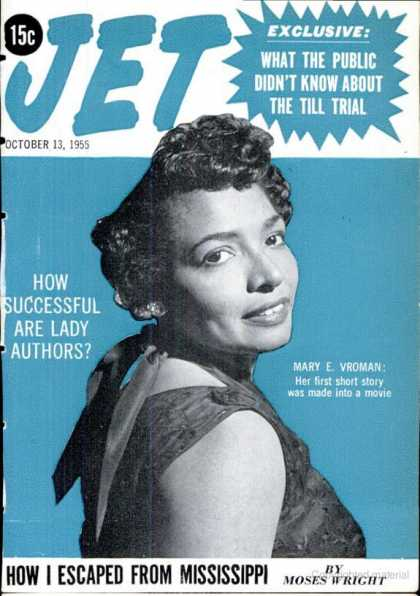
Beauchamp first encountered Emmett Till's story in the pages of an old Jet magazine his parents had kept.

Beauchamp was born in 1971 and grew up in Baton Rouge, Louisiana in a Catholic and Baptist family. When he was ten years old, he was investigating an old Jet magazine his educator parents kept and came across a story about the lynching of Emmett Till. The piece included photographs of Till prior to his murder as well as a photo of Till's mutilated body. Beauchamp's parents talked with Beauchamp about the case, explained its context in the American Civil Rights Movement and warned him about enduring attitudes that remained a threat to Beauchamp's safety as a young man. Beauchamp describes this conversation as the beginning of his lifelong devotion to investigating the Till case.

In 1989, an undercover police officer dragged Beauchamp out of a nightclub, beat him, and arrested him, allegedly for dancing with a white classmate at the club. Beauchamp credits this experience with a deeper understanding of Till's story and further motivation to examine the case.

Considering a career in civil rights law, Beauchamp attended at Southern University where he studied criminal justice but left before graduation to pursue an entertainment career.

== Career ==
In 1997, Beauchamp moved to New York City where he worked writing and producing music videos for Big Baby Films, a production company owned by friends. Beauchamp quickly began focusing on research and writing for a documentary film about the Till case, and in 1999, he founded Till Freedom Come Productions.

=== The Untold Story of Emmett Louis Till ===
Beauchamp began his research using public library microform archives, where he encountered several names of witnesses and alleged accomplices who had never been questioned by authorities regarding the Till case. He set out to find and interview them. A 2003 article in The Nation explained that Beauchamp "located and earned the trust of traumatized [B]lack witnesses from Mississippi’s back country who haven’t spoken of the case in nearly fifty years." During filming, he was warned in some communities that he was endangering residents and two witnesses in the film would only agree to be pictured in silhouette for their own safety.

During the film's research and production, Beauchamp worked closely with Till's mother, Mamie Till-Mobley, who famously insisted that her son's body be returned to Chicago and that his casket would remain open during the funeral. Beauchamp and Till-Mobley became close, speaking several times a day for eight years until her death in 2003. The film was released in 2005.

Over the course of the nine years Beauchamp spent researching the documentary, he identified several individuals, including five Black men, who he suspected had been involved in Till's murder in addition to the two who were arrested and acquitted of the crime in 1955.

==== Case reopened ====
Throughout the film's production, due to extensive research into witnesses and potential accomplices who had never been questioned, Beauchamp advocated for reopening of the Till case. On May 10, 2004, the United States Department of Justice announced that it would turn its 8,000 pages of information to 4th District Court of Mississippi Attorney Joyce Chiles, effectively reopening the case, but in 2007 a grand jury in Leflore County, Mississippi declined to indict anyone further. The U.S. Department of Justice has credited Beauchamp's efforts with the decision to re-open the case.

The case was reopened again in 2017 with renewed interest in Carolyn Bryant's culpability in Till's lynching, but was closed in 2021 without any new arrests.

=== FBI collaboration and other work ===
As a result of his documentary work, Beauchamp was approached by the Federal Bureau of Investigation (FBI)'s civil rights division to collaborate on cold cases. In 2007, he began working to produce additional documentaries about unsolved civil rights murders. Beauchamp was given access to agents who worked on the cases, and he was able to interview new individuals as someone outside of law enforcement.

=== Till ===
Released in October 2022, Till focuses on Till-Mobley's perspective of the Emmett Till story. The film had been in production for over a decade and stars Whoopi Goldberg as Till's grandmother, Alma; Danielle Deadwyler as Till-Mobley; and Jalyn Hall as Emmett Till. Beauchamp has expressed his desire for this film to help viewers become familiar with Till-Mobley's story and how significantly the Emmett Till case contributed to the beginnings of the civil rights movement in the United States. According to Beauchamp, who co-wrote and produced the film, "There is no other story that speaks more to this generation and to this political climate and racial climate of this country than the story of Emmett Louis Till."

Beauchamp credits directors Spike Lee and Steven Spielberg for inspiring his work as a filmmaker, and Beauchamp has explained that he hopes to educate viewers about Black history in the same manner that Spielberg has brought awareness and education to Jewish history. Beauchamp has donated many of his research materials to the Strozier Library at Florida State University, whose special collections department contain an extensive repository of materials related to the Till case.
