= Willie Louis =

Witness to the murder of Emmett Till (1937–2013)

- Born: Willie Reed; June 14, 1937; Greenwood, Mississippi, U.S.
- Died: July 18, 2013 (aged 76); Oak Lawn, Illinois, U.S.
- Spouse: Juliet Louis

Willie Louis (born Willie Reed; June 14, 1937 – July 18, 2013) was an American man who was a witness to the murder of 14-year-old Emmett Till. Till was an African-American child from Chicago who was murdered in 1955 after he had reportedly whistled at a white woman at a grocery store in Money, Mississippi. Till's murder was a watershed moment in the Civil Rights Movement. Louis testified in court about what he had seen, but an all-white jury found the men not guilty. Fearing for his life, Louis moved to Chicago after the trial and changed his name from Willie Reed to Willie Louis. He was interviewed in 2003 for the PBS documentary The Murder of Emmett Till and was interviewed the next year on the CBS News television program 60 Minutes.

== Early years ==
Willie Reed, as Willie Louis was then known, was born in 1937 in Greenwood, Mississippi, at the eastern edge of the Mississippi Delta. He was raised in Drew, Mississippi, by his grandparents who worked as sharecroppers. Reed received little formal education and worked in the cotton fields.

== Emmett Till case ==
=== Witness to murder ===
Emmett Till, a 14-year-old African-American from Chicago, was murdered in Mississippi in August 1955 for having reportedly flirted with and whistled at a 21-year-old white woman in a grocery store. The case and subsequent trial have been called "watershed moments in the civil rights movement, galvanizing public attention on the deep perils of being black in the Jim Crow South."

On the morning of Sunday, August 28, 1955, Reed, who was 18 years old, was walking on a dirt road near Drew, Mississippi, when he saw a green-and-white Chevrolet pick-up drive past him with four white men in the front and three African-American men and an African-American youth seated with his back to the cab. Reed recognized two of the men in the front seat as Roy Bryant, the husband of the woman at whom Till had reportedly whistled, and J.W. Milam, Bryant's half-brother.

Reed saw the truck pull into a plantation owned by Milam's brother and park in front of a barn. As he walked closer, he heard a boy inside the barn yelling, "Mama, save me!" and "Lord, have mercy!" He heard the sounds of blows landing on a body and voices cursing and yelling, "Get down, you black bastard." Reed ran to the nearby house of Amanda Bradley and told her what he had seen and heard. Reed and another individual were sent to get water from a well near the barn. As they did so, they heard the continuing sound of the beating until the cries became fainter and then stopped.

As Reed walked back toward the Bradley house, Milam emerged from the barn with a pistol at his side. Milam confronted Reed and asked if he had seen or heard anything. Reed told Milam that he had not. Reed returned to the Bradley house and watched from a window as the men in the barn loaded what appeared to be a body into the pick-up truck.

=== Decision to testify ===
On August 31, 1955, Till's lynched body was discovered in the Tallahatchie River. The body showed signs that Till had been brutally beaten and shot in the head. Reed saw a photograph of Till in the newspaper and recognized him as the youth who he had seen hunkered down in the truck. Bryant and Milam were arrested for the murder, but Reed's grandfather warned Reed that he would be risking his safety if he spoke up. Reed was later approached by civil rights workers who persuaded him to testify in court. To ensure his safety, Reed went into hiding until the trial.

When Reed arrived at the courthouse to testify in the middle of September 1955, he was met by a "thicket of Klansmen massed outside the courthouse." Reed testified at the trial. He was shown a picture of Till and testified that it looked like the boy he had seen in the back of the truck. He also identified Milam and testified that he had seen Milam come out of the barn to get a drink of water and then return to the barn. In his closing argument, the prosecutor reviewed Reed's testimony and noted that if Willie had been lying, the defense would have had needed 50 lawyers to discredit him. The prosecutor argued being unable to do that "because Willie Reed was telling the truth." He finished by saying, "I don't know but what Willie Reed has more nerve than I have." Despite Reed's testimony and other evidence, Bryant and Milam were found not guilty after an hour of deliberation by the all-white jury.

=== Reaction to trial ===
In the aftermath of the trial, some suggested that Reed had not been a good witness and noted that he had given inconsistent accounts as to how far he was from Milam and whether he really recognized him. Even Till's mother later said that "Little Willie Reed" was "not a good witness." She added, "Willie Reed had a story, but he couldn't tell it. It was locked inside him. It would have taken education to put the key in the lock and turn it loose. Every word that was gotten from Willie had to be pulled out word by word. That's because Willie is 18 years old and has probably been to school only 3 years."

Others had a more positive reaction to Reed's testimony. The Jackson Daily News described his testimony as "the most damaging introduced thus far" and as having "electrified the court." The New York Times later wrote that Reed's testimony "made him a hero" of the Civil Rights Movement. The Daily Worker published an article titled "The Shame of Our Nation", expressing outrage at the result but praising Reed and other witnesses as "heroes of the Negro people ... who stood up in court and in defiance of a white supremacist code fearlessly gave their testimony."

The historian David T. Beito said of Reed: "He was really the best eyewitness that they found.... [H]is act in some sense was the bravest act of them all. He had nothing to gain: he had no family ties to Emmett Till; he didn't know him. He was this 18-year-old kid who goes into this very hostile atmosphere." Wright Thompson, author of The Barn: The Secret History of a Murder in Mississippi, said, "Willie Reed should be on money. They should name aircraft carriers after Willie Reed. . . . There should be a statue of him somewhere."

== Later years ==
After testifying in the Till case, Reed moved to Chicago and changed his name from Willie Reed to Willie Louis. He was employed as an orderly at Woodlawn Hospital and later at Jackson Park Hospital. In 1976, he was married to Juliet Louis, who was a nursing aide at Jackson Park. Louis remained silent about his role in the Emmett Till case. His wife did not even learn of his connection to the case until 1984 and recalled that "he didn't talk about it much."

In 2003, Louis was located and interviewed by Stanley Nelson, who later wrote a book and produced a documentary on the case. Nelson's documentary, The Murder of Emmett Till, was broadcast on PBS television in the United States and included an interview with Louis. Nelson later said:

Willie Reed stood up, and with incredible bravery pointed out the people who had taken and murdered Emmett Till. He was from Mississippi, and somewhere in his heart of hearts, he had to know that these people would not be convicted. But he did what he had to do.

Thereafter, Louis met Till's mother and began speaking in public about the case. In 2004, he was interviewed on the CBS News television show 60 Minutes. During the interview, Louis explained his reasoning in deciding to testify: "I couldn't have walked away from that. Emmett was 14, probably had never been to Mississippi in his life, and he come to visit his grandfather and they killed him. I mean, that's not right."

In July 2013, Louis died of intestinal bleeding at age 76 in Oak Lawn, Illinois.
