= A Cross to Bear =

- Written by: Cas Sigers-Beedles
- Directed by: Tandria Potts
- Starring: Danielle Deadwyler; Kim Fields; Jackie Long; Malinda Williams
- Music by: Kenneth Lampl
- Country of origin: United States
- Original language: English

Production
- Producers: Tandria Potts; Terri J. Vaughn; Cas Sigers-Beedles
- Cinematography: Samm Styles
- Editor: Adrian Lovell
- Running time: 89 minutes
- Production companies: Clean Energy Entertainment; Nina Holiday Entertainment

Original release
- Network: Gospel Music Channel
- Release: 2012

A Cross to Bear is a 2012 American drama film written by Cas Sigers-Beedles and directed by Tandria Potts and starring Danielle Deadwyler in her screen debut. The film also stars Kim Fields, Jackie Long, and Malinda Williams. The film follows homeless alcoholic (Danielle Deadwyler) and her newborn baby and a former nurse (Kim Fields) who provides shelter for her.

The film received Black Reel Awards nomination for Outstanding Screenplay in a TV Movie or Limited Series.

== Cast ==
- Danielle Deadwyler as Erica Moses
  - Storm Reid as Young Erica
- Kim Fields as Joan
- Jackie Long as Charles
- Malinda Williams as Fae
