= Danielle Deadwyler =

American actress and writer (born 1982)

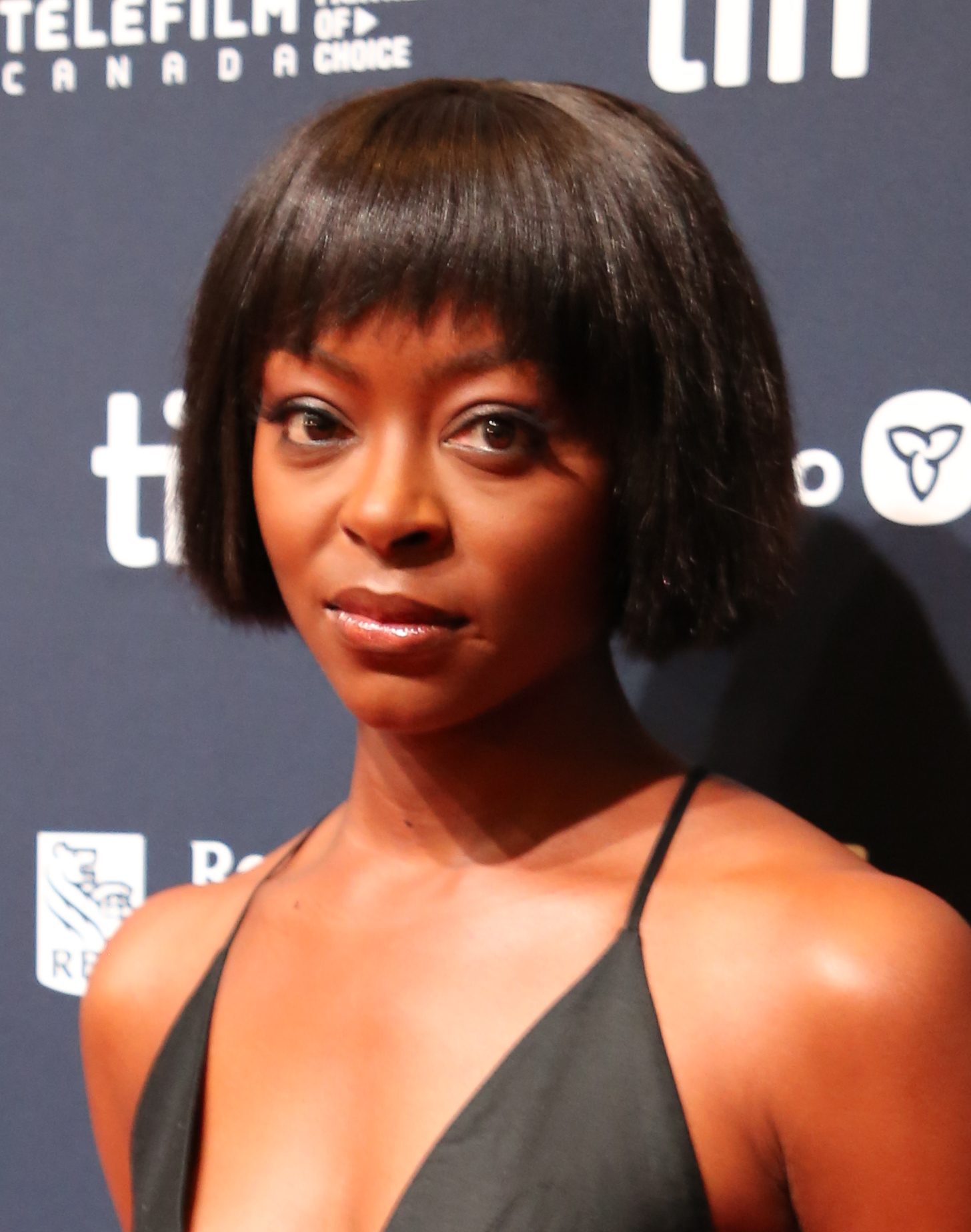
- Deadwyler in 2024
- Born: May 3, 1982 (age 44); Atlanta, Georgia, U.S.
- Education: Spelman College (BA); Columbia University (MA); Ashland University (MFA)
- Occupation: Actress
- Years active: 2008–present
- Children: 1
- Website: danielledeadwyler.com

Danielle Deadwyler (born May 3, 1982) is an American actress. She earned critical acclaim for her roles in The Harder They Fall (2021), as Mamie Till in Till (2022), and as a conflicted mother in The Piano Lesson (2024). Deadwyler received British Academy Film Award and Screen Actors Guild Award nominations for Till, and a second SAG nomination for The Piano Lesson.

Deadwyler began her career as a theatre actress in Atlanta, Georgia. Deadwyler then transitioned to film and television roles and made her screen debut in the 2012 drama film A Cross to Bear. She appeared in the primetime soap opera The Haves and the Have Nots (2015–2017), the drama series P-Valley (2020), and the miniseries Station Eleven (2021–2022) and From Scratch (2022). In 2025, Time magazine named Deadwyler one of the 100 most influential people in the world.

== Early life and education ==
Deadwyler, who is of African American heritage, was born on May 3, 1982, in Atlanta, Georgia and raised in Southwest Atlanta. She is the daughter of a legal secretary and a railroad supervisor and has three siblings. Deadwyler graduated from Grady High School (now Midtown High School) and then Spelman College with an undergraduate degree in History and African American Studies. She earned a Master of Arts in American Studies from Columbia University followed by a Master of Fine Arts in Creative Writing from Ashland University in 2017.

== Career ==
=== Early career and stage work ===
Deadwyler began her career appearing on stage productions, including Charlotte's Web, The Real Tweenagers of Atlanta, and most notable playing the role of Lady in Yellow in For Colored Girls Who Have Considered Suicide / When the Rainbow Is Enuf at the True Colors Theater in Atlanta in 2009. Deadwyler received positive reviews for leading performance in Alliance Theatre's The C.A. Lyons Project. On Atlanta stage, she appeared in the Pulitzer Prize-winning play Clybourne Park at Aurora Theater, portrayed an actress injured doing Shakespeare in Smart People at True Colors Theater, and played multiple roles in The Temple Bombing at the Alliance Theater.

=== 2012–2020: Film debut and television roles ===
Deadwyler made her film debut playing the leading role of a homeless, alcoholic mother in the 2012 drama A Cross to Bear directed by Tandria Potts. Deadwyler later acted in a number of short films, then landed roles on television. In 2015, Deadwyler guest-starred in the second season of BET's drama series Being Mary Jane. Later that year, she joined the cast of Tyler Perry's series The Haves and the Have Nots, playing antagonist LaQuita "Quita" Maxwell. Deadwyler left the series during Season 4. Eventually, she had secondary roles in the films Gifted and The Leisure Seeker, and appeared in the television series Greenleaf, Atlanta and Watchmen. In 2018, Deadwyler played the title role of Jane Manning James in the period drama film Jane and Emma. She played a leading role and produced the 2019 thriller film The Devil To Pay. The film and Deadwyler's performance received positive reviews from critics. Cath Clarke from The Guardian wrote in her review: "Deadwyler's soulful performance really grounds The Devil to Pay even as it cranks into revenge-movie mode." In 2020, Deadwyler was cast in a series regular role in the series Paradise Lost, with Josh Hartnett, Bridget Regan and Barbara Hershey. The series was not renewed for a second season. That same year, Deadwyler guest-starred on FBI: Most Wanted and had a recurring role as Yoli in the series P-Valley.

=== 2021–2022: Breakthrough with The Harder They Fall and Till ===
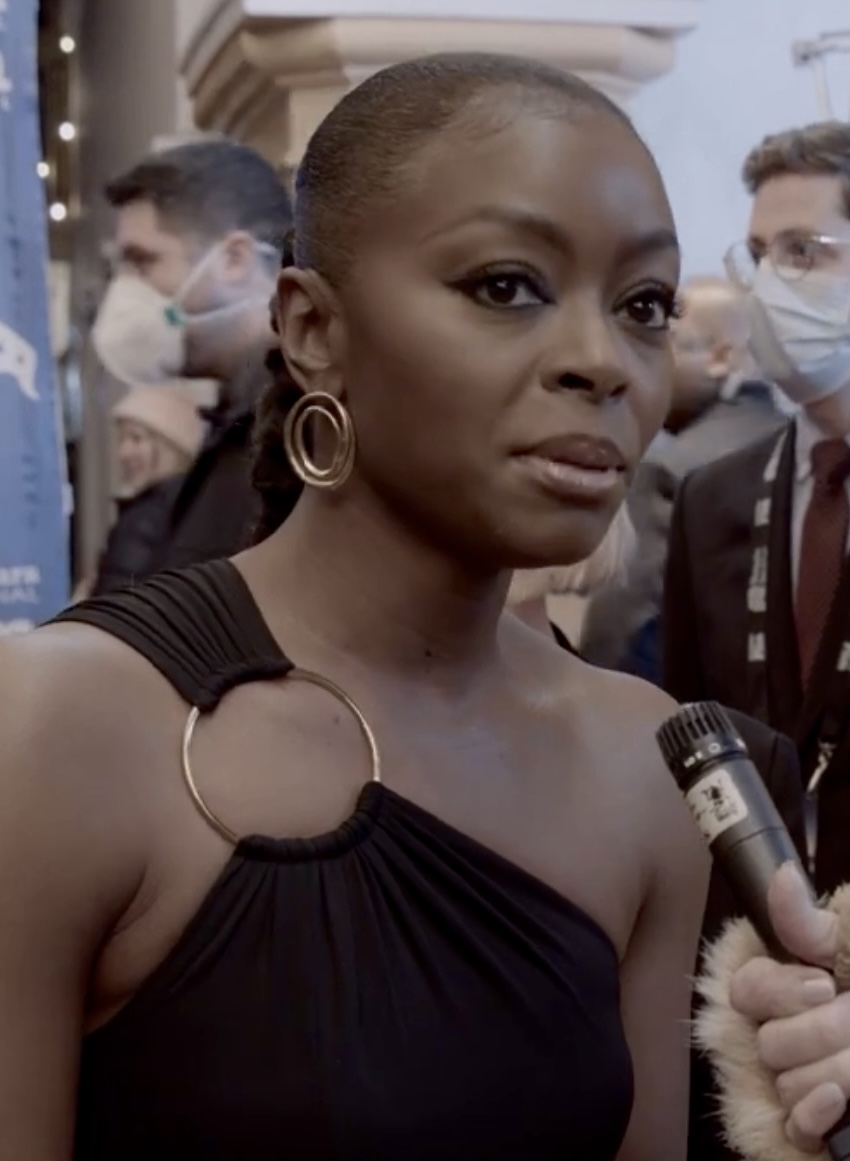
Deadwyler in 2023

In 2021, Deadwyler played the role of Cuffee in the Netflix western film The Harder They Fall. The character was inspired by Cathay Williams. The film and her performance received positive reviews from film critics. Deadwyler received an NAACP Image Award for Outstanding Supporting Actress in a Motion Picture nomination for her performance and well as number of Best Ensemble awards. Later that year, Deadwyler played Miranda Carroll in the miniseries Station Eleven. Also that year, she was in the Netflix miniseries From Scratch, based on Tembi Locke's memoir. Deadwyler played the role of lead character' older sister, receiving positive reviews.

In 2022, Deadwyler starred as Mamie Till in the biographical film Till directed by Chinonye Chukwu. She received positive reviews from critics for her lead performance in the movie. Manohla Dargis in The New York Times: "With fixed intensity and supple quicksilver emotional changes, Deadwyler rises to the occasion as Mamie, delivering a quiet, centralizing performance that works contrapuntally with the story's heaviness, its profundity and violence." Deadwyler received the National Board of Review Award for Breakthrough Performance (shared with Gabriel LaBelle for The Fabelmans) and the Gotham Independent Film Award for Outstanding Lead Performance for her performance.

=== 2023–present: Continued success ===
In 2024, Deadwyler played the leading role in the science fiction thriller film Parallel directed by Kourosh Ahari, a remake of Lei Zheng's feature of the same name. She starred in the horror-thriller film I Saw the TV Glow, which premiered at the 2024 Sundance Film Festival to positive reviews from critics. Deadwyler also starred in The Piano Lesson, an adaptation of the August Wilson play, and in the Canadian post-apocalyptic thriller film 40 Acres. For The Piano Lesson, Deadwyler earned her second Screen Actors Guild Awards nomination in the Supporting Actress category, her first having been in Leading Actress for her role in Till. Her guest appearance as Syd's cousin Chantel on The Bear episode "Worms" was positively received, with Rolling Stone critic Alan Sepinwall describing Deadwyler, "one of most chameleonic actors we have," as having disappeared into the "relaxed, confident, funny role." Deadwyler appeared in the action thriller Carry-On for Netflix. She also starred in the horror film The Woman in the Yard. Both films were directed by Jaume Collet-Serra.

Time magazine named Deadwyler one of the 100 most influential people in the world in 2025.

Deadwyler is slated to executive produce and star in the upcoming comedic thriller The Saviors. She will also portray Zelma Redding, widow of American singer Otis Redding, in the biographical drama Otis & Zelma. In February 2025, Deadwyler joined the HBO comedy series Rooster opposite Steve Carell, taking on the role of a poetry professor and published author. That spring, she was announced as the lead in the film adaptation of The Street, based on the 1946 novel by Ann Petry. In October 2025, a first-look photo accompanied news of Deadwyler's addition to the Season 3 cast of Euphoria. The following month, she was reported to have joined the ensemble of India Donaldson's drama The Chaperones.

In February 2026, Deadwyler was cast in a lead role for the upcoming reboot of The X-Files, produced by Ryan Coogler. She will star opposite her Station Eleven castmate Himesh Patel. In October 2026, Hollywood Reporter announced the show had received a series order from Hulu.

== Personal life ==
Deadwyler has a son named Ezra. Her family history was explored on the April 7, 2026 episode of Finding Your Roots.

== Filmography ==
Key
†	Denotes films that have not yet been released

=== Film ===
Year	Title	Role	Notes
2010	Cyburbia	Alice Johnson	Short film
2012	A Cross to Bear	Erica Moses	
2013	Sweet, Sweet Country	Ndizeye	Short film
2014	Ir/Reconcilable	Maria	Short film, also producer
2015	The Youth	Hoda	Short film
2017	Gifted	Animal shelter worker	
2017	The Leisure Seeker	Hotel waitress	
2018	Jane and Emma	Jane Manning	
2019	The Devil to Pay	Lemon Cassidy	Also producer
2020	It's Time	Karen Phillips	
2020	Bygone Billy	Trudy Wake	
2021	The Harder They Fall	Cuffee	
2022	Till	Mamie Till	
2024	I Saw the TV Glow	Brenda	
2024	Parallel	Vanessa	Also executive producer
2024	The Piano Lesson	Berniece Charles	
2024	40 Acres	Hailey Freeman	
2024	Carry-On	Elena Cole	
2025	The Woman in the Yard	Ramona	Also executive producer
2026	The Saviors †	TBA	Also executive producer; post-production
TBA	The Chaperones †	TBA	Post-production
TBA	The Bell Jar †	TBA	Post-production

=== Television ===
Year	Title	Role	Notes
2015	Being Mary Jane	Naima	Episode: "Signing Off"
2015–2017	The Haves and the Have Nots	LaQuita "Quita" Maxwell	Recurring role
2016	Greenleaf	Stacy	Episodes: "Good Morning, Calvary" and "What Are You Doing Here?"
2018	Hap and Leonard	Woman	Episode: "T-Bone Mambo"
2018	Atlanta	Tami	Episode: "Champagne Papi"
2019	Watchmen	June	Episodes: "This Extraordinary Being" and "An Almost Religious Awe"
2020	FBI: Most Wanted	Cleo Wilkens	Episode: "Caesar"
2020	Paradise Lost	Nique Green	Series regular
2020	P-Valley	Yoli	Recurring role, 3 episodes
2021–2022	Station Eleven	Miranda Carroll	Miniseries
2022	From Scratch	Zora	Miniseries
2025	The Bear	Chantel	Episode: "Worms"
2026	Rooster	Dylan Shepard	Series regular
2026	Euphoria	Mama Brown	Episode: "Stand Still and See"
TBA	The X-Files	TBA	Lead role, pre-production

== Awards and nominations ==
=== Major associations ===
Year	Award	Category	Work	Result	Ref.
2022	Critics' Choice Awards	Best Acting Ensemble	The Harder They Fall	Nominated	
2023	Critics' Choice Awards	Best Actress	Till	Nominated	
2025	Critics' Choice Awards	Best Supporting Actress	The Piano Lesson	Nominated	
2023	British Academy Film Awards	Best Actress in a Leading Role	Till	Nominated	
2023	Screen Actors Guild Awards	Outstanding Performance by a Female Actor in a Leading Role	Till	Nominated	
2025	Screen Actors Guild Awards	Outstanding Performance by a Female Actor in a Supporting Role	The Piano Lesson	Nominated	

=== Other awards ===
Year	Award	Category	Work	Result	Ref.
2019	Nightmares Film Festival	Best Actress Feature	The Devil to Pay	Nominated	
2020	GenreBlast Film Festival	Best Actress – Feature Film	The Devil to Pay	Won	
2021	Princess Grace Award	"For her filmmaking, which is decidedly more experimental"	—N/a	Won	
2021	Gotham Awards	Ensemble Tribute	The Harder They Fall	Won	
2021	Washington D.C. Area Film Critics Association Awards	Best Ensemble	The Harder They Fall	Nominated	
2021	National Board of Review Awards	Best Cast	The Harder They Fall	Won	
2021	San Diego Film Critics Society	Best Performance by an Ensemble	The Harder They Fall	Nominated	
2021	Women Film Critics Circle	The Invisible Woman Award	The Harder They Fall	Won	
2022	African-American Film Critics Association	Best Ensemble	The Harder They Fall	Won	
2022	Austin Film Critics Association	Best Ensemble	The Harder They Fall	Nominated	
2022	Hollywood Critics Association Awards	Best Cast Ensemble	The Harder They Fall	Nominated	
2022	NAACP Image Awards	Outstanding Supporting Actress in a Motion Picture	The Harder They Fall	Nominated	
2022	NAACP Image Awards	Outstanding Ensemble Cast in a Motion Picture	The Harder They Fall	Won	
2022	Black Reel Awards	Outstanding Breakthrough Performance, Female	The Harder They Fall	Nominated	
2022	Gotham Awards	Outstanding Lead Performance	Till	Won	
2022	Santa Barbara International Film Festival	Virtuosos Award	Till	Won	
2022	Critics Choice Association; Celebration of Black Cinema and Television	Actress Award for Film	Till	Won	
2022	Chicago Film Critics Association Award	Most Promising Performer	Till	2nd place	
2022	National Board of Review	Breakthrough Performance - Female	Till	Won	
2022	Los Angeles Film Critics Association Awards	Best Lead Performance	Till	Runner-up	
2022	St. Louis Film Critics Association	Best Actress	Till	Nominated	
2022	Washington D.C. Area Film Critics Association	Best Actress	Till	Nominated	
2022	Atlanta Film Critics Circle	Best Breakthrough Performer	Till	Nominated	
2022	Dallas–Fort Worth Film Critics Association	Best Actress	Till	4th place	
2022	Florida Film Critics Circle	Best Actress	Till	Nominated	
2022	Greater Western New York Film Critics Association	Best Actress	Till	Nominated	
2022	Greater Western New York Film Critics Association	Breakthrough Performance	Till	Nominated	
2022	Indiana Film Journalists Association	Best Lead Performance	Till	Nominated	
2022	IndieWire Critics Poll	Best Performance	Till	4th place	
2022	Las Vegas Film Critics Society	Best Actress	Till	Nominated	
2022	Online Association of Female Film Critics	Best Female Lead	Till	Nominated	
2022	Phoenix Critics Circle	Best Actress	Till	Nominated	
2022	UK Film Critics Association	Actress of the Year	Till	Nominated	
2022	Utah Film Critics Association	Best Actress	Till	Runner-up	
2022	Women Film Critics Circle	Best Actress	Till	Nominated	
2022	Black Film Critics Circle	Best Actress	Till	Won	
2023	Critics' Choice Movie Awards	Best Actress	Till	Nominated	
2023	Alliance of Women Film Journalists	Best Actress	Till	Nominated	
2023	Alliance of Women Film Journalists	Best Breakthrough Performance	Till	Won	
2023	Toronto Film Critics Association	Best Actress	Till	Nominated	
2023	Austin Film Critics Association	Best Actress	Till	Nominated	
2023	Columbus Film Critics Association	Best Lead Performance	Till	Nominated	
2023	Hollywood Critics Association	Best Actress	Till	Nominated	
2023	DiscussingFilm Critic Awards	Best Actress	Till	Nominated	
2023	Georgia Film Critics Association	Best Actress	Till	Nominated	
2023	Georgia Film Critics Association	Breakthrough Award	Till	Won	
2023	North Carolina Film Critics Association	Best Actress	Till	Nominated	
2023	San Diego Film Critics Society	Best Actress	Till	Won	
2023	San Diego Film Critics Society	Breakthrough Artist	Till	Runner-up	
2023	San Francisco Bay Area Film Critics Circle	Best Actress	Till	Nominated	
2023	Independent Spirit Awards	Best Supporting Performance in a New Scripted Series	Station Eleven	Nominated	
2023	Satellite Award	Best Actress in a Motion Picture, Drama	Till	Won	
2023	Black Reel Awards	Outstanding Actress	Till	Won	
2023	Denver Film Critics Society	Best Actress	Till	Nominated	
2023	Houston Film Critics Society	Best Actress	Till	Nominated	
2023	NAACP Image Awards	Outstanding Actress in a Motion Picture	Till	Nominated	
2023	NAACP Image Awards	Outstanding Supporting Actress in a Television Movie, Limited-Series or Dramatic Special	From Scratch	Nominated	
2023	Dorian Awards	Film Performance of the Year	Till	Nominated	
2023	DiscussingFilm Critic Awards	Best Actress	Till	Nominated	
2023	African-American Film Critics Association	Best Actress	Till	Won	
2023	Latino Entertainment Journalists Association	Best Actress in a Leading Role	Till	Nominated	
2024	Astra Film Awards	Best Supporting Actress	The Piano Lesson	Nominated	
2024	Black Film Critics Circle	Best Supporting Actress	The Piano Lesson	Won	
2024	Boston Society of Film Critics	Best Supporting Actress	The Piano Lesson	Won	
2024	Chicago Film Critics Association	Best Supporting Actress	The Piano Lesson	Nominated	
2024	Dallas–Fort Worth Film Critics Association	Best Supporting Actress	The Piano Lesson	4th place	
2024	Elle's Women in Hollywood Celebration	The Witness	The Piano Lesson	Honored	
2024	Gotham Awards	Ensemble Tribute (shared)	The Piano Lesson	Honored	
2024	Gotham Awards	Outstanding Supporting Performance	The Piano Lesson	Nominated	
2024	Middleburg Film Festival	Breakthrough Actor Award	The Piano Lesson	Honored	
2024	Mill Valley Film Festival	MVFF Award for Acting	The Piano Lesson	Honored	
2024	Newport Beach Film Festival	Outstanding Performance Female	The Piano Lesson	Won	
2024	New York Film Critics Online	Best Supporting Actress	The Piano Lesson	Runner-up	
2024	San Diego Film Critics Society	Best Supporting Actress	The Piano Lesson	Nominated	
2024	Seattle Film Critics Society	Best Supporting Actress	The Piano Lesson	Nominated	
2024	St. Louis Film Critics Association	Best Supporting Actress	The Piano Lesson	Nominated	
2024	Online Association of Female Film Critics	Best Acting Ensemble (shared)	The Piano Lesson	Nominated	
2024	Online Association of Female Film Critics	Best Supporting Female	The Piano Lesson	Nominated	
2024	Washington D.C. Area Film Critics Association	Best Supporting Actress	The Piano Lesson	Won	
2025			The Piano Lesson		
2025	African-American Film Critics Association	Best Ensemble (shared)	The Piano Lesson	Won	
2025	African-American Film Critics Association	Best Supporting Actress	The Piano Lesson	Won	
2025	Alliance of Women Film Journalist EDA Award	Best Supporting Actress	The Piano Lesson	Nominated	
2025	Austin Film Critics Association	Best Supporting Actress	The Piano Lesson	Nominated	
2025	Black Reel Awards	Outstanding Supporting Performance	The Piano Lesson	Won	
2025	Chicago Indie Critics Windie Award	Best Supporting Actress	The Piano Lesson	Nominated	
2025	Columbus Film Critics Association	Best Ensemble (shared)	The Piano Lesson	Nominated	
2025	Columbus Film Critics Association	Best Supporting Performance	The Piano Lesson	Nominated	
2025	DiscussingFilm Global Critic Award	Best Supporting Actress	The Piano Lesson	Won	
2025	Film Independent Spirit Awards	Best Supporting Performance	The Piano Lesson	Nominated	
2025	Georgia Film Critics Association	Best Supporting Actress	The Piano Lesson	Won	
2025	Girls On Film Awards	Best Performance in a Supporting Role	The Piano Lesson	Won	
2025	Kansas City Film Critics Circle	Best Supporting Actress	The Piano Lesson	Runner-up	
2025	London Film Critics' Circle Awards	Supporting Actress of the Year	The Piano Lesson	Nominated	
2025	Utah Film Critics Association	Best Supporting Performance, Female	The Piano Lesson	Won	
2025	Satellite Awards	Best Actress in a Supporting Role	The Piano Lesson	Nominated	
2025	NAACP Image Awards	Outstanding Breakthrough Performance in a Motion Picture	The Piano Lesson	Nominated	
2025	NAACP Image Awards	Outstanding Ensemble Cast in a Motion Picture (shared)	The Piano Lesson	Nominated	
2025	NAACP Image Awards	Outstanding Supporting Actress in a Motion Picture	The Piano Lesson	Nominated	
2025	NBP Film Community Awards	Best Supporting Actress	The Piano Lesson	Nominated	
2025	NBP Film Award	Best Supporting Actress	The Piano Lesson	Nominated	
2025	North American Film Critic Association	Best Supporting Actress	The Piano Lesson	Nominated	
2025	Women Film Critics Circle	Best Supporting Actress	The Piano Lesson	Runner-up	
2025	Offscreen Central Awards	Best Body of Work	Carry-On, I Saw the TV Glow, The Piano Lesson	Nominated	
2026	Black Reel Awards	Outstanding Lead Performance	40 Acres	Nominated	
2026	NAACP Image Awards	Outstanding Actress in a Motion Picture	40 Acres	Nominated	
2026	Astra TV Awards	Best Supporting Actress in a Comedy Series	Rooster	Nominated	
2026	Black Reel TV Awards	Outstanding Supporting Performance in a Comedy Series	Rooster	Nominated	
2026	Black Reel TV Awards	Outstanding Guest Performance in a Comedy Series	The Bear	Won	
2026	Black Reel TV Awards	Outstanding Guest Performance in a Drama Series	Euphoria	Nominated	
