= Chinonye Chukwu =

Nigerian American film director (born 1985)

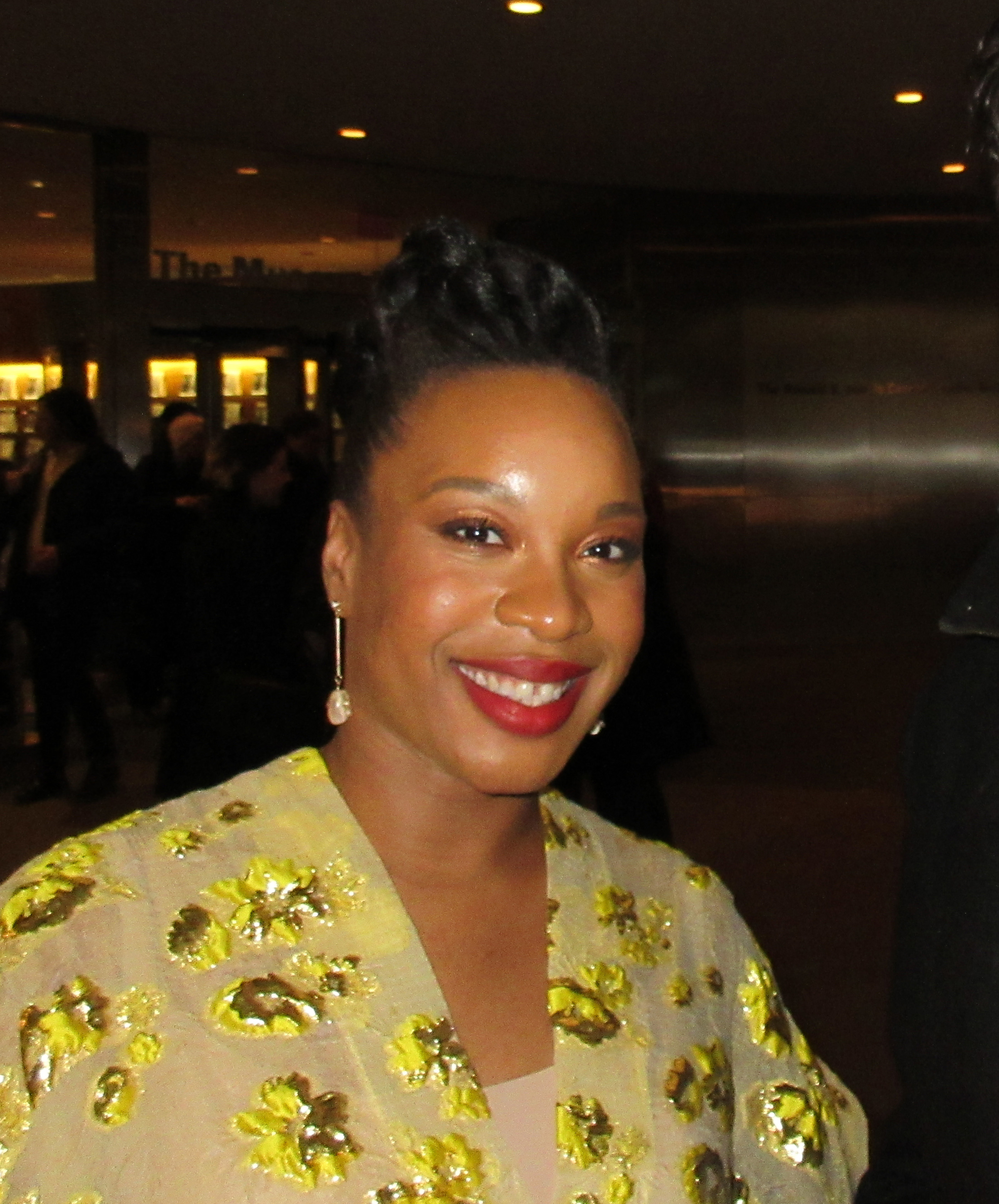
- Chukwu in 2019
- Born: May 19, 1985 (age 41); Nigeria
- Occupation: Film director
- Years active: 2010–present
- Notable work: Clemency; Till

Chinonye Chukwu (/ˈtʃiːnoʊjə ˈtʃuːkuː/ CHEE-noh-yə CHOO-koo; born May 19, 1985) is a Nigerian-American film director best known for the drama films Clemency and Till. She is the first black woman to win the U.S. Dramatic Grand Jury Prize at Sundance.

== Early life and education ==
Chukwu was born in Port Harcourt, Nigeria. When she was just over a year old, her family moved to Oklahoma, and moved again to Fairbanks, Alaska when she was six. They visited Nigeria often.

Growing up in Alaska, Chukwu was often the only black person in her classes, and she struggled to fit in. Throughout her childhood she dealt with Seasonal affective disorder, which was exacerbated by limited wintertime daylight in Alaska. To cope, she read Maya Angelou and joined the weight-lifting club. Chukwu always wanted to make movies. In her teen years, she carried around a journal that she would write down ideas for films and music videos. She often wrote stories about Nigerian-American girls reconnecting with loves or lost siblings.

She received her bachelor's degree in English from DePauw University, where she joined Zeta Phi Beta. She then enrolled in film school at Temple University.

During the 2013–2014 academic year Chukwu received the Hodder Fellowship from Princeton University.

== Career ==
Chukwu directed The Dance Lesson in 2010, about a young black girl who struggles to become a ballerina in an increasingly gentrified community. Her first feature film, Alaska-Land (2012), told the story of an estranged Nigerian-American brother and sister who eventually reunite in their hometown of Fairbanks, Alaska. The film was rejected from every festival and lab program she applied to. In 2013 she directed A Long Walk (2013), a short film about a child who is publicly ridiculed by his father.

Clemency (2019) was written and directed by Chukwu. The death row drama stars Alfre Woodard as a prison warden coming to terms with the demands of her profession and Aldis Hodge as one of her inmates bound for execution. Her inspiration for the film came from the case of Troy Davis, a prisoner executed in 2011. She moved to Los Angeles in 2017 to shoot the film. She received the U.S. Dramatic Grand Jury Prize at 2019 Sundance, the first black woman to do so.

In 2019, it was reported that Chukwu was slated to direct A Taste Of Power, a film based on the memoir of the same name by Elaine Brown.

Chukwu wrote and directed the 2022 film Till, a biographical film about Mamie Till-Mobley's pursuit of justice after the 1955 lynching of her 14-year-old son Emmett Louis Till.

In 2023, it was reported that Chukwu was slated to direct Wolf Hustle, a film based on the memoir of the same name by Cin Fabré for Apple Studios.

== Filmography ==
Short film

Chinonye Chukwu's short film credits
| Year | Title | Director | Writer | Producer | Notes |
|---|---|---|---|---|---|
| 2009 | Igbo Kwenu! | Yes | Yes | Yes | |
| 2010 | The Dance Lesson | Yes | Yes | Yes | Also editor |
| 2012 | Bottom | Yes | Yes | Yes | Also editor |
| 2013 | Dust | No | No | Yes | |
| 2013 | Mud Lotus | No | No | Yes | Also first assistant director |
| 2013 | A Long Walk | Yes | Yes | Yes | |

=== Feature film ===
Chinonye Chukwu's feature film credits
| Year | Title | Director | Writer | Producer |
|---|---|---|---|---|
| 2012 | alaskaLand | Yes | Yes | Yes |
| 2019 | Clemency | Yes | Yes | No |
| 2022 | Till | Yes | Yes | Executive |

Other credits

Chinonye Chukwu's feature film credits
| Year | Title | Role | Notes |
|---|---|---|---|
| 2008 | Chronic Town | Production assistant | |
| 2011 | 5 Afternoons | Production manager | Short film |
| 2013 | A Historical Approach to the Positive Music: Jazz in Philadelphia! | Production manager | Documentary |

=== Television ===
Chinonye Chukwu's television credits
| Year | Title | Note |
|---|---|---|
| 2019 | Sorry for Your Loss | Episode "I'm Here" |

== Awards and nominations ==
| Year | Title | Award/Nomination |
|---|---|---|
| 2010 | The Dance Lesson | Honorary Mention, Los Angeles International Film Festival |
| 2019 | Clemency | Nominee, Black Reel Awards: Outstanding Screenplay, Outstanding Emerging Director, Outstanding First Screenplay, and Outstanding Independent Feature; Winner, Sundance Film Festival, U.S. Dramatic Grand Jury Prize |
