= Art's Properties =

2023 book by David Joselit

Art’s Properties
- Cover
- Author: David Joselit
- Language: English
- Subject: Art, history
- Publisher: Princeton University Press
- Publication date: February 14, 2023 (US); April 11, 2023 (UK)
- Publication place: United States
- Media type: Print (hardcover), e-book
- Pages: 184
- ISBN: 9780691236049

Art's Properties is a 2023 book by American art historian David Joselit. The book discusses how artworks have been treated as property to reinforce power from the nineteenth century to today. Joselit considers questions of ownership, the role of museums in art's commodification, and debates over repatriation and restitution, drawing on historical and contemporary examples—including the Louvre's origins in looted works and recent controversies around artistic representation. He also considers how identity has become a kind of property in contemporary art practice.

== Background ==
In an interview with Shanti Escalante-De Mattei, David Joselit discussed how questions of ownership and "proprietary identity" shape modern debates on representation and repatriation. Joselit linked these issues back to the founding of the Louvre. He argued that the museum's appropriation of objects set a precedent for commodifying both art and identity. He cited the Dana Schutz Open Casket controversy as an example of how notions of exclusive ownership of pain can clash with the universalizing logic of empathy. Joselit proposed that the concept of the "legitimate witness," judged by the quality of one's testimony rather than one's background, offers a more equitable framework for assessing works that depict sensitive histories. He also suggested that museums could address systemic inequities by examining practices like staff relations and acquisitions, rather than relying solely on empathy-based defenses of contentious artworks.

== Summary ==
The book examines how art from the nineteenth century to the present came to function as a commodity. Joselit based his book on historical and contemporary examples, as he connects the founding of the Louvre—whose collection included looted works and faced calls for restitution early on—to ongoing debates over repatriation and identity in the Global South and Euro-American museums. Throughout the text, Joselit contends that "possessive individualism," underpinned by white supremacist property values, has shaped modern art by tying the value of an artwork to the attributes of its creator, the nation, or the period in which it was made. In a series of chapters, he narrates the emergence and "capture" of modern art through discussions of a range of subjects, including the 1900 Paris Exposition, W.E.B. Du Bois's interventions on race, Adrian Piper's conceptual practice, and the controversy surrounding Dana Schutz's Open Casket. Joselit concludes by suggesting that artworks remain at least partly "unappropriable" due to their potential to generate ongoing, open-ended experience—a concept he characterizes as art's "alterity."

== Reviews ==
Alex Kitnick discussed how the text presented a sweeping critique of the modern artist and the museum as agents of proprietary ownership. He described the central argument as comprehensive yet prompting exceptions, stating, "At moments I found myself wondering if it holds true for all modern cultural producers." He noted that the controversy surrounding a particular painting illustrated the tension between artistic freedom and claims of ownership. He argued that the text favored witnessing and bearing testimony over possessive notions of artistic identity or property. He considered how certain artworks unveiled exploitative institutional structures and insisted on deeper engagement with social and political contexts. He contended that the examination demanded a fundamental reconsideration of authorship and property within the contemporary art world.

Morgan Falconer expressed initial dismay that the new publication devoted theoretical attention to visitors taking photographs of iconic artworks, describing it as "primitive herd behaviour." He found reassurance in the fact that this phenomenon was only a starting motif rather than the central pillar of the argument. He focused on the text's treatment of "possessive individualism," noting how modern artists leveraged self-possession while marginalized groups were often denied that same autonomy. He contrasted Lawrence Weiner's permissive gestures with Adrian Piper's self-dispossession performances, suggesting that both challenged—but were also ultimately contained by—the dominant property-based art system. He observed that the controversy surrounding a painting of Emmett Till underscored debates over who could claim ownership of suffering or history. Finally, he concluded that the work was more concerned with provoking thought about art's property relations than with offering an airtight theoretical structure.

J. J. Charlesworth observed that the text framed "dis-possession" as a necessary corrective to the way modern art became defined by ideas of property and ownership. He noted that the discussion spanned the origins of the Western museum and the role of colonial plunder, highlighting how such practices supported the "possessive individualism" inherent in modern artistic production. He offered the view that marginalised groups, long denied self-possession, were effectively excluded from full participation in the art system. He illustrated this point with the Whitney Biennial controversy, in which debates over exploitation and identity reinforced the notion that art often remained a proprietary asset. "His provisional solution," Charlesworth wrote, "seems more ethical than political, a cultural rejection of proprietorial relations rather than their social abolition." He concluded that the argument, while provocative, signaled a work in progress, hinting at larger questions yet to be answered.

In her review of the book, Genevieve Lipinsky de Orlov situated the text within a broader discussion on nonprofit art institutions and the growing privatization of art. de Orlov contended that the work "made no explicit mention of capitalism," identifying what she viewed as a significant gap in its analysis. She noted that the second half of the work concentrated on a contemporary controversy involving representation and moral ownership but largely avoided the economic dimension of commodification. The reviewer described the writing style as dense and sometimes difficult, though she acknowledged its valuable attention to the political and ethical stakes of art. She raised doubts about the possibility of exiting the "proprietary regime of possessive individualism" without a critique of capitalism.
