= Willfully Whimsical =

Painting by Lisa Corinne Davis

- Artist: Lisa Corinne Davis
- Year: 2006
- Medium: Oil and collage on wood panel
- Dimensions: 91.4 cm × 152.4 cm (36.0 in × 60.0 in)
- Location: Philadelphia Museum of Art, Philadelphia

Willfully Whimsical is a 2006 painting by Lisa Corinne Davis. It is in the collection of the Philadelphia Museum of Art in Philadelphia, Pennsylvania in the United States.

Completed in 2006, Davis used oil paint and collage to on a wood panel to create a complex, abstract painting.

Willfully Whimsical was gifted to the Philadelphia Museum of Art by Davis in 2008.
