= 68th Street–Hunter College station =

New York City Subway station in Manhattan

68 Street–Hunter College
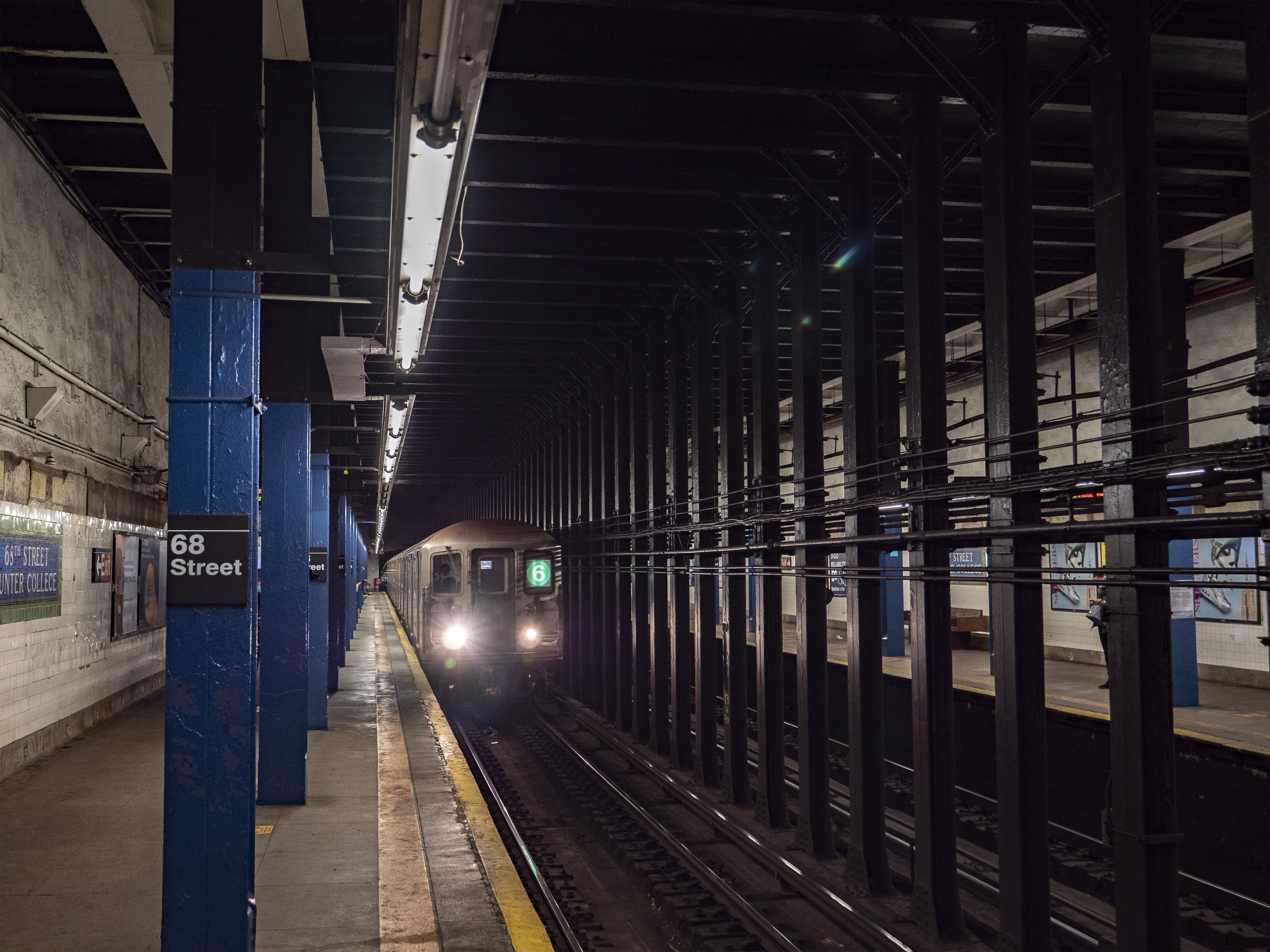
- R62A 6 train arriving at the southbound platform

Station statistics
- Address: East 68th Street & Lexington Avenue; New York, New York
- Borough: Manhattan
- Locale: Upper East Side
- Coordinates: 40.767834°N 73.964124°W
- Division: A (IRT)
- Line: IRT Lexington Avenue Line
- Services: 4 (late nights); 6 (all times) <6> (weekdays until 8:45 p.m., peak direction)
- Transit: NYCT Bus: M66, M98, M101, M102, M103; MTA Bus: BxM1
- Structure: Underground
- Platforms: 2 side platforms
- Tracks: 2

Other information
- Opened: July 17, 1918; 108 years ago
- Accessible: Yes

Traffic
- 2025: 5,373,920 ▲1.9%
- Rank: 54 out of 423
Services
Preceding station	New York City Subway	Following station
77th Street 4 6 <6> toward Pelham Bay Park	Local	59th Street 4 6 <6> toward Brooklyn Bridge–City Hall
does not stop here
Location
Location within New York City Subway
Location within New York City
Location within New York
Track layout
Street map
Station service legend
Symbol	Description
Stops all times	Stops all times
Stops late nights only	Stops late nights only
Stops rush hours in the peak direction only	Stops rush hours in the peak direction only

The 68th Street–Hunter College station is a local station on the IRT Lexington Avenue Line of the New York City Subway, located at the intersection of Lexington Avenue and 68th Street on the Upper East Side of Manhattan. It is served by the 6 train at all times, the <6> train during weekdays in the peak direction, and the 4 train during late nights.

This station was constructed as part of the Dual Contracts by the Interborough Rapid Transit Company and opened in 1918, and was renovated in the 1980s. A further renovation between 2021 and 2024 made the station compliant with the Americans with Disabilities Act of 1990 and provided additional entry points.

== History ==
=== Planning and construction ===
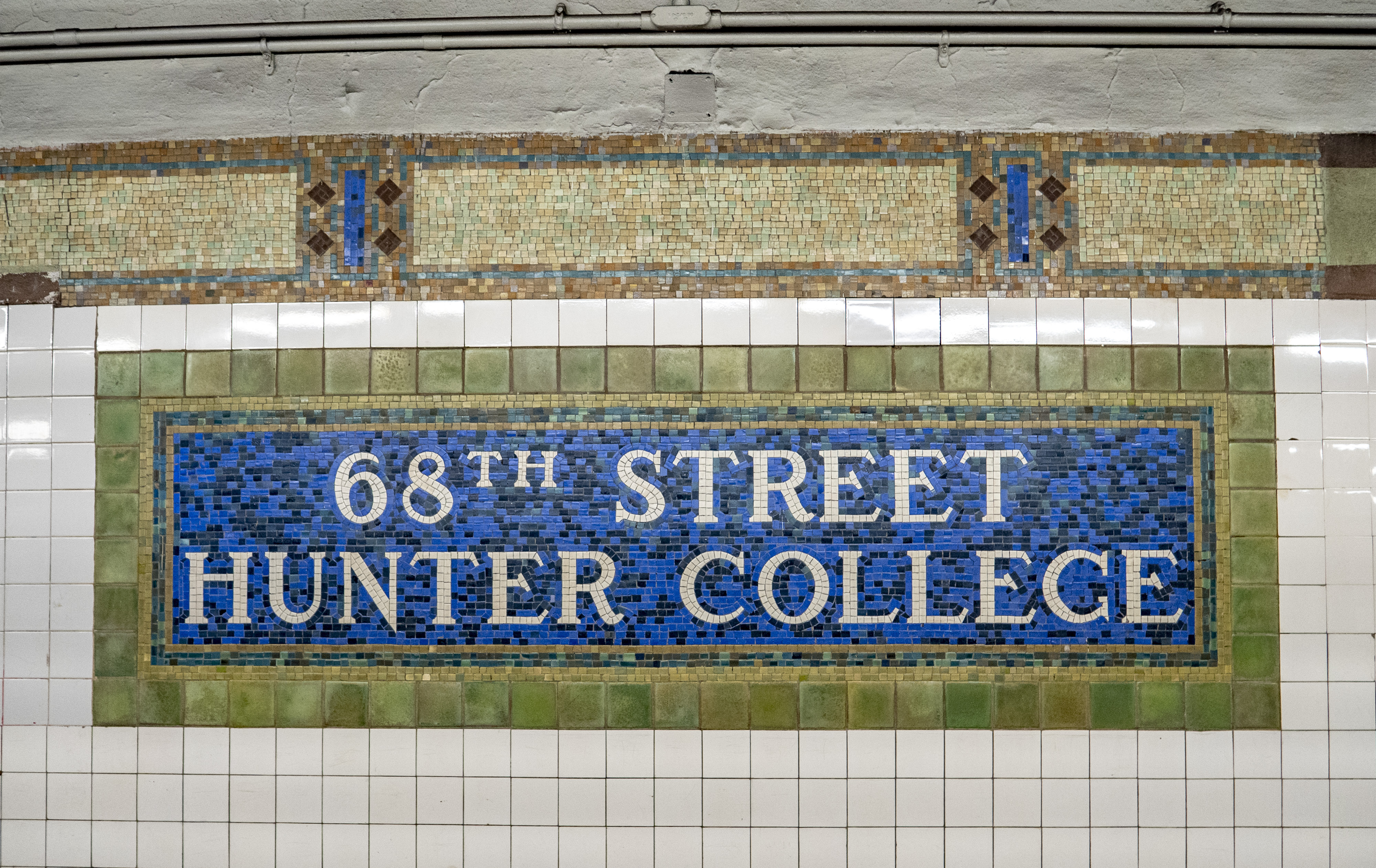
Mosaic name tablet

Following the completion of the original subway, there were plans to construct a line along Manhattan's east side north of 42nd Street. The original plan for what became the extension north of 42nd Street was to continue it south through Irving Place and into what is now the BMT Broadway Line at Ninth Street and Broadway. In July 1911, the IRT had withdrawn from the talks, and the Brooklyn Rapid Transit Company (BRT) was to operate on Lexington Avenue. The IRT submitted an offer for what became its portion of the Dual Contracts on February 27, 1912.

In 1913, as part of the Dual Contracts, which were signed on March 19, 1913, the Public Service Commission planned to split the original Interborough Rapid Transit Company (IRT) system from looking like a "Z" system (as seen on a map) to an H-shaped system. The original system would be split into three segments: two north–south lines, carrying through trains over the Lexington Avenue and Broadway–Seventh Avenue Lines, and a west–east shuttle under 42nd Street. This would form a roughly H-shaped system. It was predicted that the subway extension would lead to the growth of the Upper East Side and the Bronx.

On February 15, 1917, the Public Service Commission agreed to change the name of the under-construction station from 68th Street to 68th Street–Hunter College at the request of officials of Hunter College.

=== Opening ===
The 68th Street–Hunter College station opened on July 17, 1918, with service initially running between Grand Central–42nd Street and 167th Street via the line's local tracks. On August 1, the "H system" was put into place, with through service beginning on the new east and west side trunk lines, and the institution of the 42nd Street Shuttle along the old connection between the sides. The cost of the extension from Grand Central was $58 million.

=== Station renovations ===
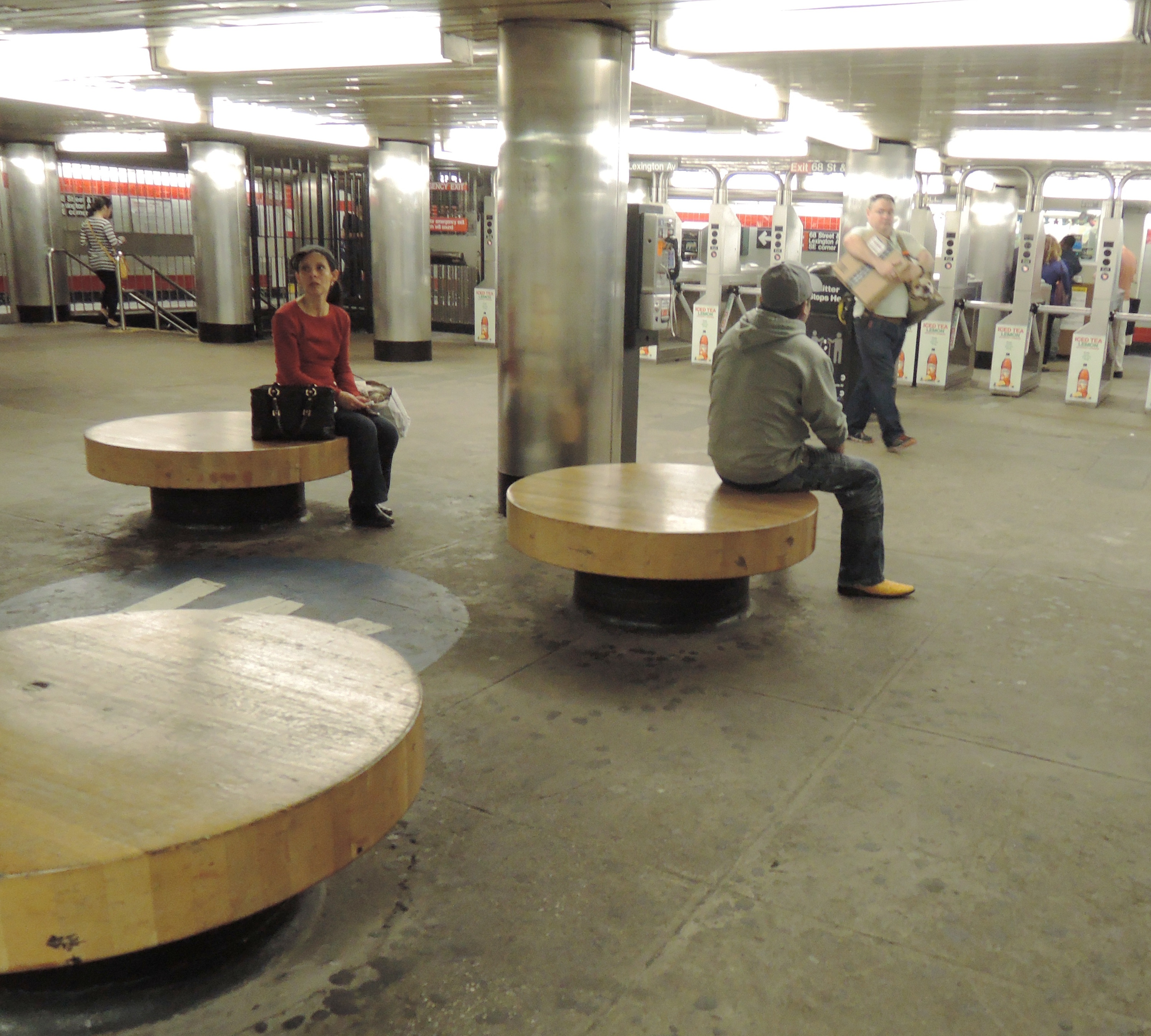
Mezzanine level

The city government took over the IRT's operations on June 12, 1940.

In 1981, the Metropolitan Transportation Authority (MTA) listed the station among the 69 most deteriorated stations in the subway system. This station was renovated in September 1984 as part of the MTA's Adopt-A-Station Program in conjunction with a renovation of Hunter College.

==== Elevator installation ====
As early as 2008, the MTA had wanted to install elevators at the 68th Street station. The MTA proposed to build elevators here under the 2010–2014 MTA Capital Program, as part of the MTA's 100 Key ADA-accessible stations program. The project scope included include building elevators at 68th Street and new street stair entrances at 69th Street and Lexington Avenue. In late 2011 and early 2012, the project faced local opposition; opponents claimed the new staircases would ruin the character of 69th Street. The MTA insisted the new entrances were necessary to reduce congestion at the station's current entrances. The 69th Street Tenants Corporation suggested building new entrances at 67th Street or 70th Street instead, although the station does not reach under either of those streets. These proposals would have required construction of new passageways connecting the platforms to 67th Street and 70th Street, which would be more expensive and take longer to construct.

The MTA originally hoped to award a construction contract by November 2013, but the project stalled for several years. In 2016, the MTA released an environmental assessment for the project, proposing to build a new southbound-only entrance at the southwest corner of 69th Street and Lexington Avenue, and a new northbound-only entrance on the east side of Lexington Avenue midblock between 68th and 69th Streets, at the suggestion of the 69th Street Tenants Corporation. As of July 2017, project design was still delayed, due to unresolved conflicts regarding real estate and infrastructure relocation work. The MTA hoped to award a contract by August 2018, with construction starting in December 2018, and completed in April 2021. By early 2019, the cost of the project had increased to $116 million. As of December 2019, a contract for the elevators' construction was projected to be awarded in July 2020 and be completed by 2023. The street-to-mezzanine elevator was originally supposed to be installed at the southeast corner of Lexington Avenue and 69th Street. The elevator was relocated to the northeast corner after engineers determined that the elevator would have been too complicated to install at the original location.

In December 2021, a contract for the renovations was awarded to Forte/Citnalta JV. The latest design moved the street elevator next to a relocated stair at the northeast corner of 68th Street and Lexington Avenue; an engineering analysis confirmed the original location of the proposed elevator, at the southeast corner of the intersection under the overhang of Hunter College East, was structurally infeasible. A relocated street stair on the west side of Lexington Avenue opened in October 2022, and the midblock entrance to the northbound platform opened in March 2023. The elevators were finally opened in December 2024, having cost $177 million.

== Station layout ==
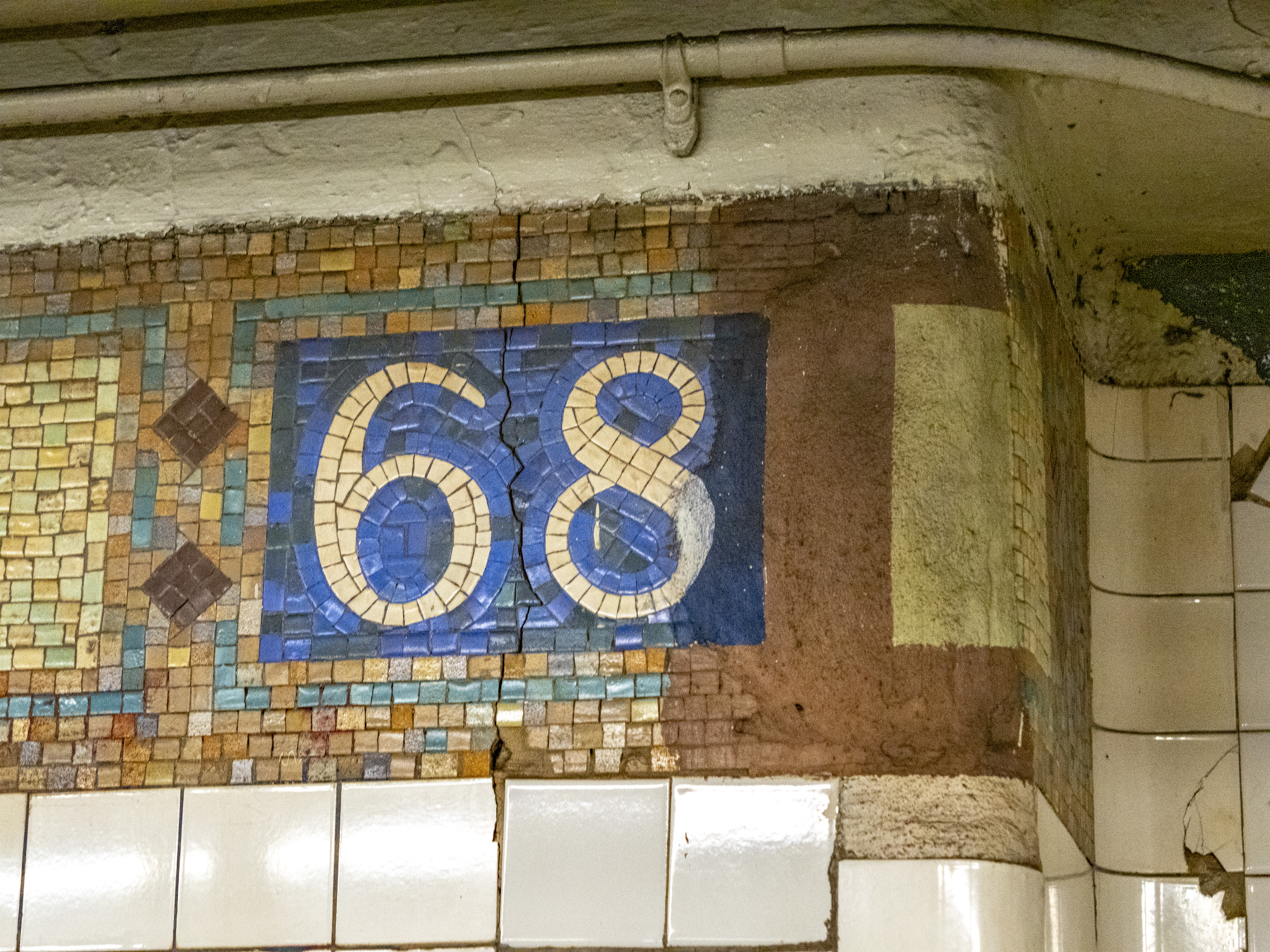
Mosaic frieze, partially repainted

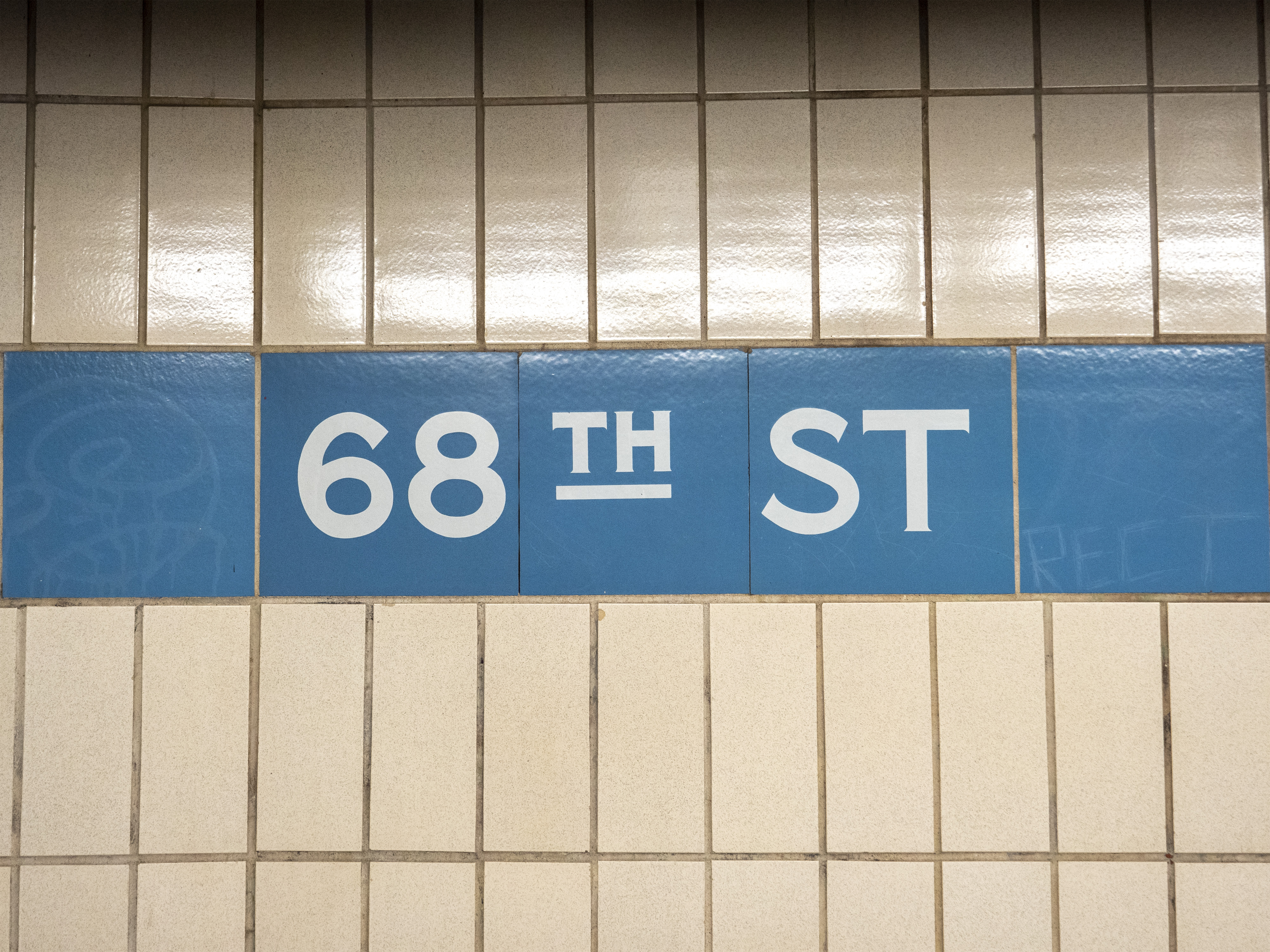
Platform extension trim line

This underground station has two local tracks and two side platforms. The express tracks of the Lexington Avenue Line, used by the 4 and 5 trains during daytime hours, pass beneath the station and are not visible from the platforms. The 6 stops here at all times, and the 4 stops here during late nights. The station is between 77th Street to the north and 59th Street to the south. Automated announcements on the R142 fleet refer to the station as 68th Street.

Both platforms have their original brown and yellow mosaic trim line with "68" friezes on it at regular intervals. Where some tiles have degraded and fallen off, the wall is painted in matching colors. Below the trim line are mosaic name tablets reading "68TH STREET-HUNTER COLLEGE" broken onto two lines in white seriffed lettering on blue with a gold and green border. On small sections of the platforms on either ends, where they were extended in the 1950s, there are blue trim lines with "68TH ST" white lettering printed on them. Midnight blue I-beam columns run along both platforms at regular intervals with alternating ones having the standard black station name plate in white lettering. Fixed platform barriers, which are intended to prevent commuters falling to the tracks, are positioned near the platform edges. Both platforms have emergency exits from the lower level express tracks.

Toward the south end of the platforms are two stairs leading to the only mezzanine in the station. It has been renovated with stainless steel fare control rails and features red accent stripes in the IND style. Old wall lights exist but are not functional. The waiting area inside fare control has windows that allow a full view of the platforms and tracks. The northern half of the station without the mezzanine has very high ceilings.

Two glass mosaic artworks, Tempestuous Terrain and Liminal Location by Hunter College professor Lisa Corinne Davis, are installed at the station as part of the MTA Arts & Design program. The Liminal Location mural is split into two sections. Both artworks consist of painted and engraved pieces of glass, which depict lines winding through a multicolored field. These decorations were intended to resemble a map.

=== Exits ===
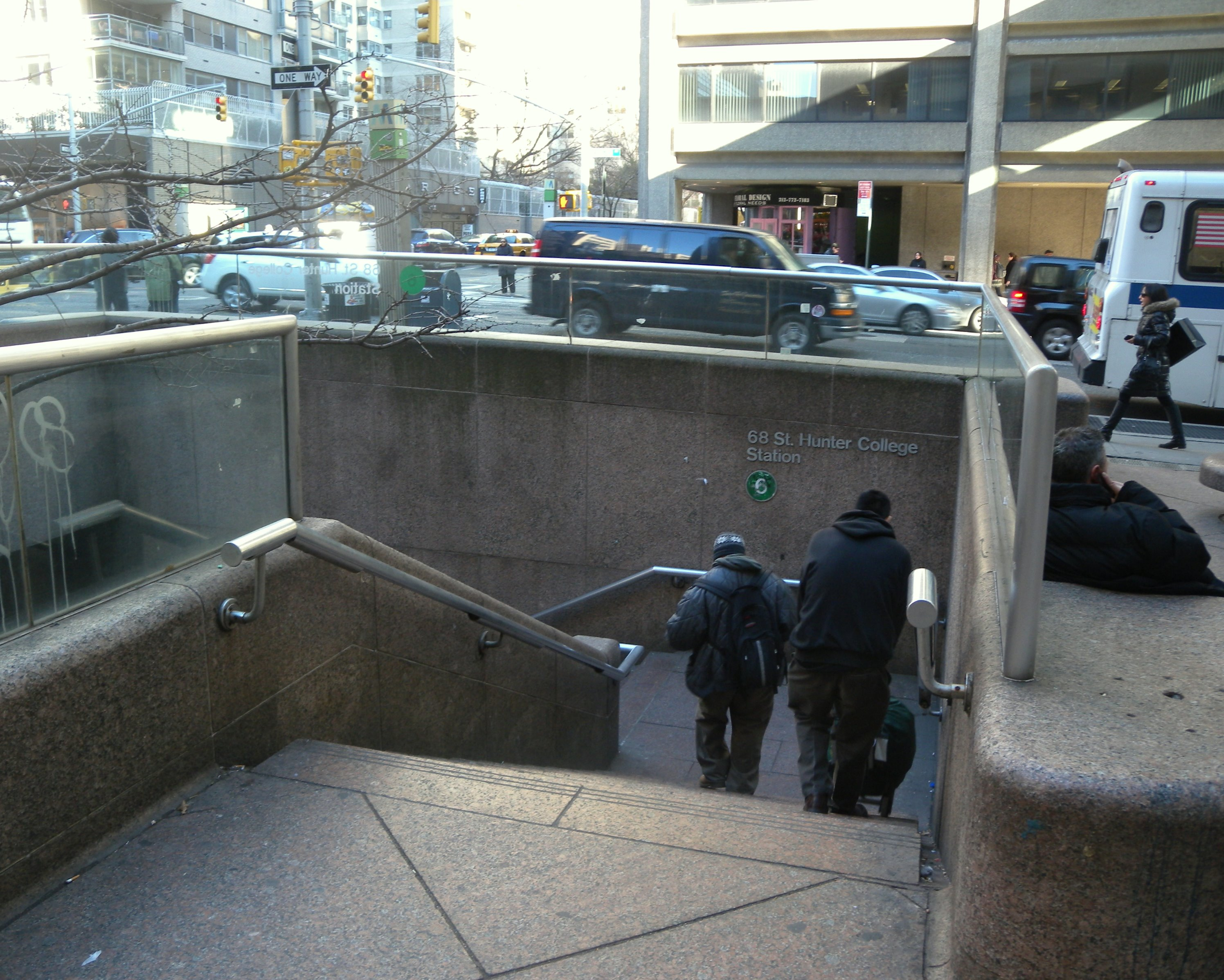
Exterior stair, southwest corner of 68th Street and Lexington Avenue

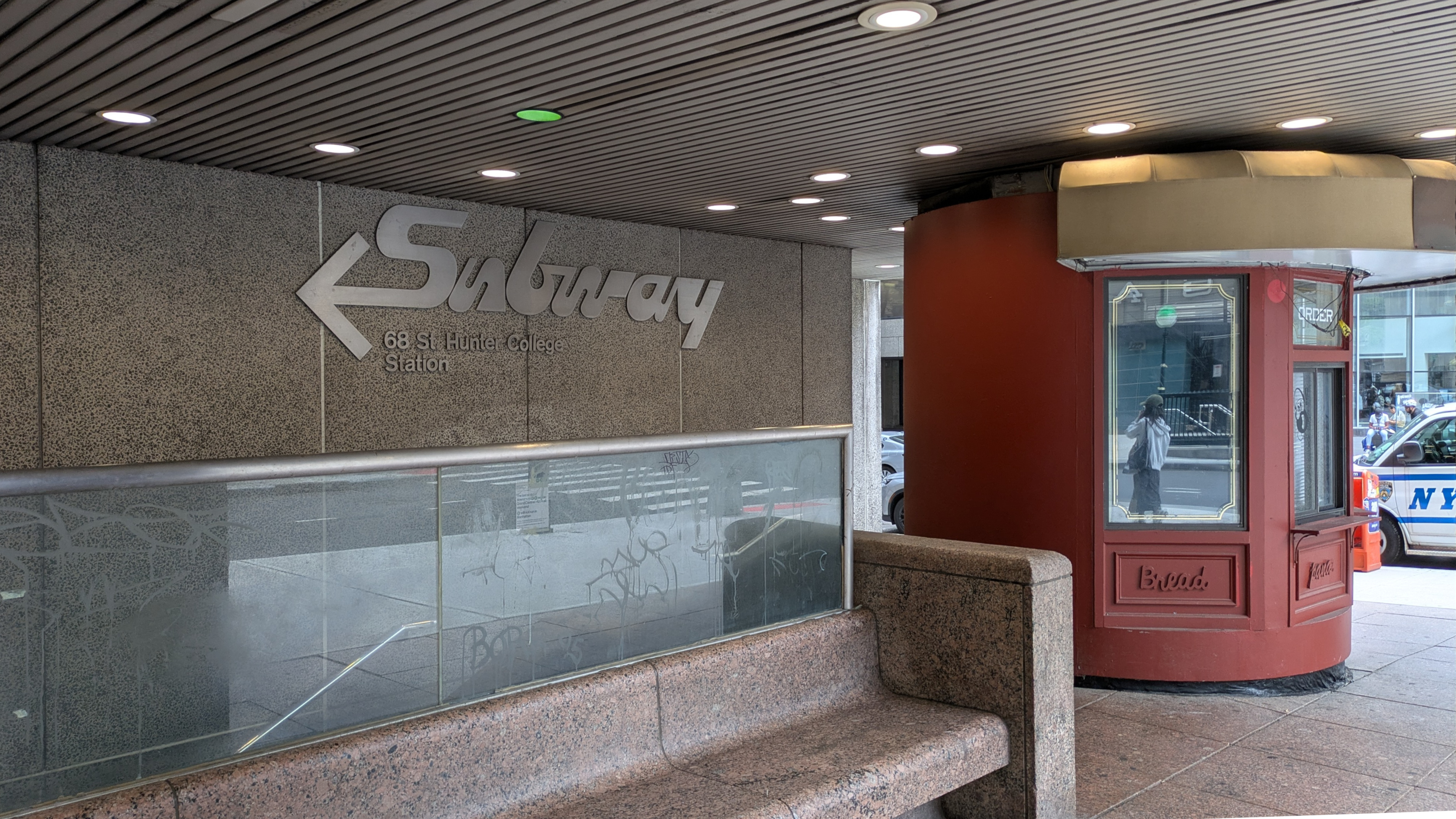
Exterior stair, southeast corner of 68th Street and Lexington Avenue

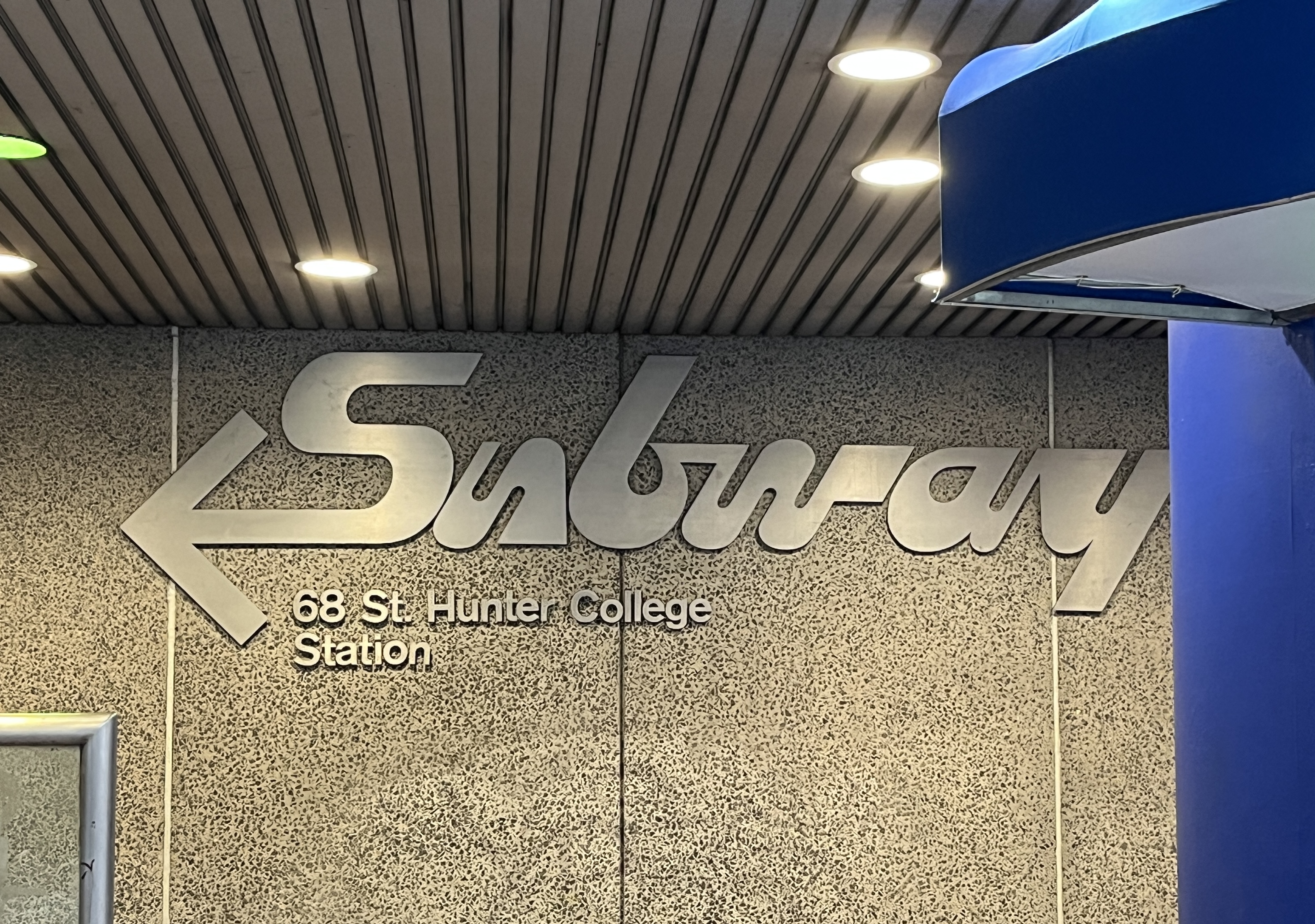
The subway sign created by Barbara Solomon

Outside of the large turnstile bank that provides access to and from the station through the mezzanine, there is a token booth and a passageway on each side separated from the waiting area by a steel fence. Each passageway leads to a small staircase going up to either northern corner of 68th Street and Lexington Avenue, as well as an elevator to the northeast corner. On the east side of the mezzanine is a short staircase going up to a landing, where a larger staircase goes up to the southeast corner of 68th Street and Lexington Avenue underneath Hunter College's East Building. The west side of the mezzanine has a direct entrance to the West Building of Hunter College and a double-wide marble staircase going up to the plaza on the southwest corner of 68th Street and Lexington Avenue.

An additional entrance for the northbound platform is located on the east side of Lexington Avenue between 68th and 69th Streets. It is flush with the retail facade of the Imperial House apartment building and leads down to an intermediate landing with a small turnstile bank. An additional entrance for the southbound platform is located on the southwestern corner of Lexington Avenue and 69th Street.

The entrance at the southeast corner contains a sign with the word "Subway" in a unique typeface seen only on the Hunter campus. This sign, and other signs around the college campus that are set in the same typeface, was created by Barbara Stauffacher Solomon as part of Ulrich Franzen's 1984 expansion of the campus.
