= Open casket (disambiguation) =

Open casket may refer to:

- Open casket funeral
- Open coffin

== See also ==
- Viewing (funeral)
- Wake (ceremony)

== Other uses ==
- Open Casket, a 2016 painting by Dana Schutz
- "Open Casket", an episode of the American television series The Haunting of Hill House
- "Open Casket", a song by the death metal band Death from the 1988 album Leprosy
