= M66 (New York City bus) =

Bus route in Manhattan, New York

m66
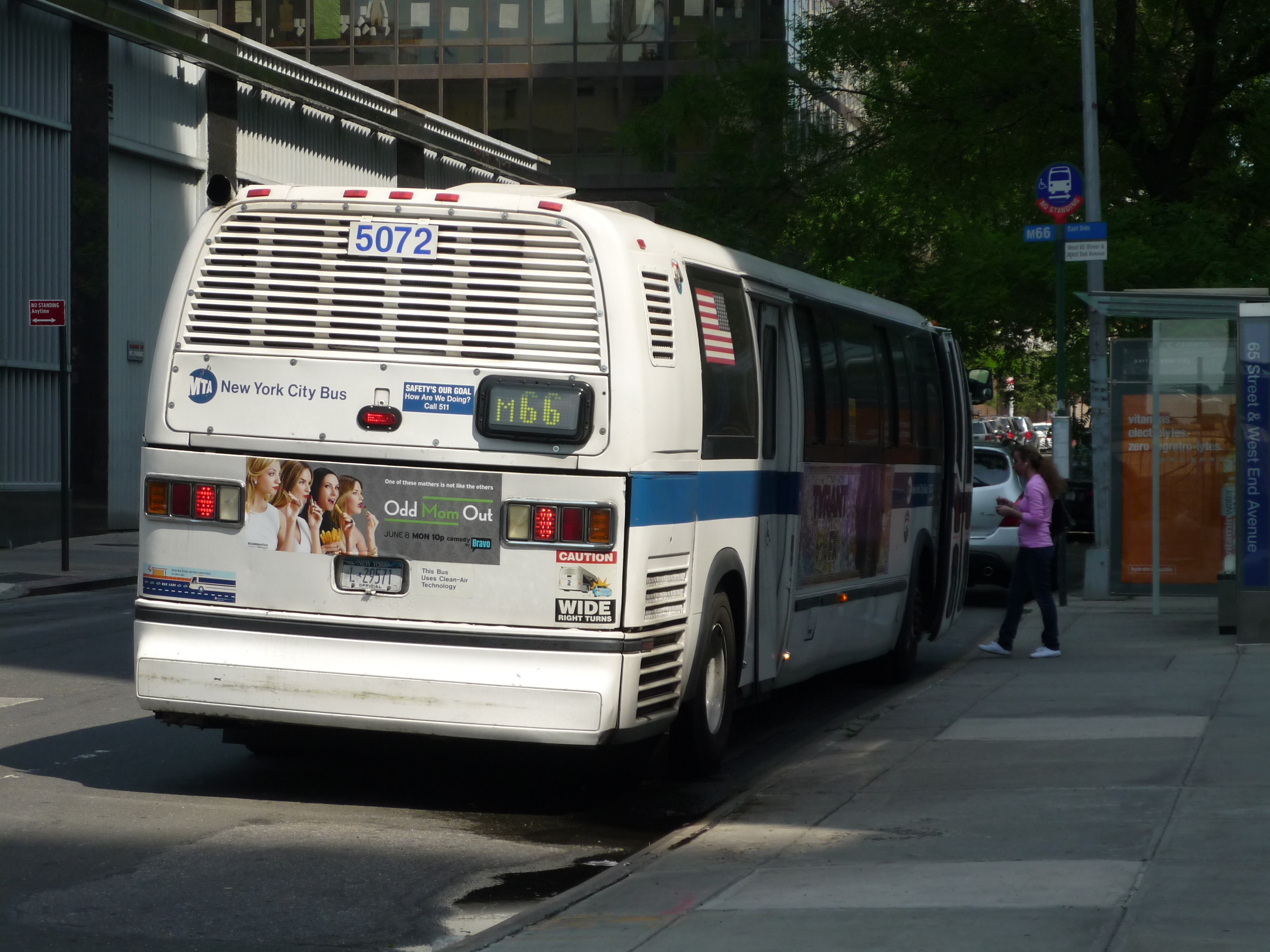
- A now-retired 1998 Nova Bus RTS-06 (5072) on the Upper East Side-bound M66

Overview
- System: MTA Regional Bus Operations
- Operator: Manhattan and Bronx Surface Transit Operating Authority
- Garage: Michael J. Quill Depot
- Vehicle: New Flyer Xcelsior XD40; New Flyer Xcelsior XE40; Nova Bus LFS HEV
- Began service: February 15, 1935

Route
- Locale: Manhattan, New York, U.S.
- Communities served: Upper West Side, Lincoln Square, Upper East Side, Lenox Hill
- Start: Upper West Side - 66th Street & West End Avenue
- Via: 66th Street, 67th Street (westbound); 65th Street, 68th Street (eastbound)
- End: Upper East Side – 68th Street & York Avenue
- Length: 2.1 miles (3.4 km)
- Other routes: M72 72nd Street Crosstown

Service
- Operates: All times except late nights
- Annual patronage: 1,794,115 (2025)
- Transfers: Yes
- Timetable: M66

The M66 constitutes a public transit line in Manhattan. Originally run by the Comprehensive Omnibus Company, it is now run by the MTA Regional Bus Operations under the MaBSTOA subsidiary, running between the Upper East Side and Upper West Side as one of Manhattan's numerous crosstown bus routes.

== Route description ==
The westbound M66 begins at 67th Street and York Avenue, travelling west on 67th Street until 5th Avenue, where it dogleg turns onto the westbound 65th Street Transverse to cross through Central Park. Westbound traffic lets out at 66th Street and Central Park West, where the M66 continues west on 66th Street until West End Avenue, where it terminates.

The eastbound M66 begins at 66th Street and West End Avenue, making two right turns to get onto East 65th Street, where it continues eastbound and through the 65th Street Transverse until Madison Avenue, where it continues north and turns to run east on 68th Street until York Avenue, where it terminates. During the morning rush, three eastbound buses originate at Hunter College at Lexington Avenue.

Along the route, there are several connections to the New York City Subway at:

- Broadway
- Lexington Avenue

The M66 is also notorious for being slow and unreliable due to travelling on narrow, heavily trafficked streets in the dense neighborhoods of the Upper West Side and Upper East Side, being tied with the M42 for the slowest buses in the city, moving at an average rate of 3.9 miles per hour in 2012 and earning an "F" ranking for 3 consecutive years from the Bus Turnaround Coalition.

== History ==
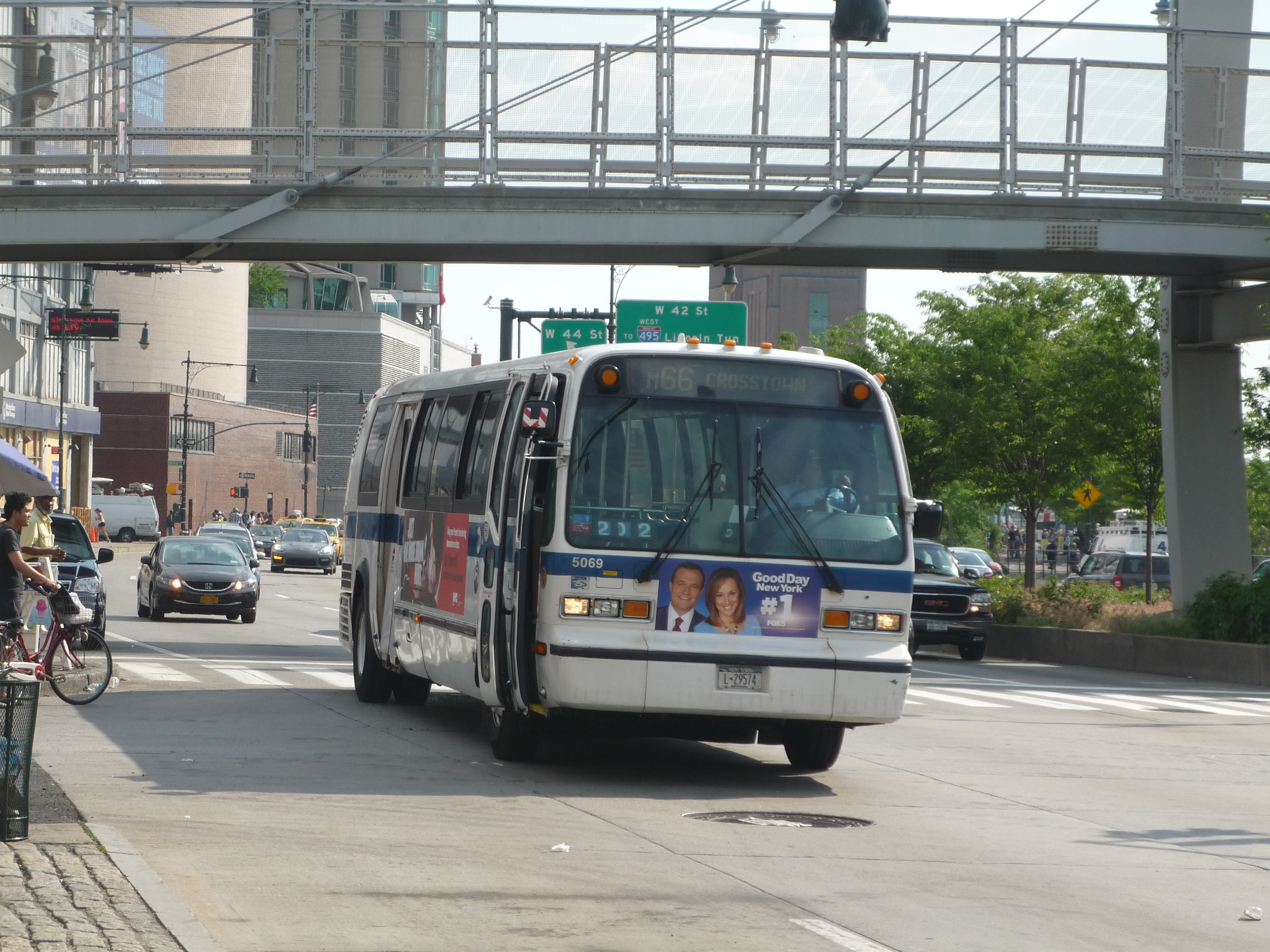
A 1998 Nova Bus RTS-06 (5069) on the M66 deadheading along West Side Highway

The M66 began as the Comprehensive Omnibus Company's M7 route on February 15, 1935.

In July 1974, its designation was changed to the M29. In November 1987, the Metropolitan Transportation Authority Board approved plans to change the eastern terminal loop of the route as well as renumber the route to the M66. Under these changes, the route would change from running east on 68th Street, north on York Avenue, west on 71st Street and north on 1st Avenue to only running north on 1st Avenue after 68th Street. The terminal was also moved one block south on York Avenue from 70th Street to 69th Street. This detour was also common as vehicles often blocked East 68th Street between First and York Avenues, and eliminated two difficult turns in the process. These changes took effect in March 1989.

Due to a budget crisis, as part of the MTA June 27, 2010 service changes, overnight service was discontinued on the route.
