= Samara Golden =

American artist based in Los Angeles (born 1973)

- Born: 1973 (age 52–53); Ann Arbor, Michigan
- Style: Installation art
- Website: samaragolden.com

Samara Golden (born 1973) is an American artist based in Los Angeles.

== Early life and education ==
Born in Ann Arbor, Michigan, Samara Golden is an installation artist based in Los Angeles. She lived in Minneapolis, San Francisco, Chicago, Austin, Portland and New York City before settling in Los Angeles. She graduated from the Minneapolis College of Art and Design in 1995, and later received an M.F.A. from Columbia University School of the Arts.

== Career ==
=== Overview ===
Her installations often include a combination of sculpture, projected video, live video, and sound. When she was included in the list of "Future Greats" by ArtReview magazine in 2013, Golden was described as an artist whose works possess "a powerful, melancholic kind of beauty".

=== Works ===
The Meat Grinder’s Iron Clothes was featured in the 2017 Whitney Biennial. The installation is 14 × 33 1/12 ft. (4.3 × 10.1 m) but appears vastly larger due to its strategic interplay of mirrors and its location on the museum's windowed fifth floor. The various "rooms" that can be made out are a cozy middle-class living space, a dull and depressing office, a luxurious penthouse apartment, and a bleak institutional space that combines elements of both a hospital and prison. The separate yet integrated environments have a disquieting flow that the gallery described as an "infinite visual abyss".

A Trap in Soft Division was featured at San Francisco's Yerba Buena Center for the Arts from March 11 to May 29, 2016. At first sight the installation appeared to be set in a massive wooden box on the floor, but mirrors ultimately guided the viewer up to the museum's vaulted skylights – 18 of them, arranged in strips of 6, and each one transformed into a unique, slightly messy living room. Roughly half scale in size, each room was different but also clearly part of a pattern: one outside strip has rooms that are sparse and minimalist; the middle colorful and cluttered; the third a subtle combination of the others. Artcritical wrote that the work "speaks to cultural standardization that begins in tract housing and apartment blocks and proceeds into the minutiae of our lives" but added that Golden believes that the recognition of such sameness can spark a positive shared experience among viewers.

Despite a relatively brief run (September 12 – October 25, 2015) at New York's Canada Gallery, A Fall of Corners attracted enthusiastic acclaim from art critics: Design Milk called it "thrilling"; Hyperallergic called it "mesmerizing" and "like magic"; and The New York Times described it as "a spectacular, topsy-turvy fun house", concluding that "Whatever it is, it's pretty exciting". In the compressed space of the gallery, fully furnished rooms sprouted out from every wall, with all of them reflected in mirrors on the floor, "so the rooms seem infinite but also give the impression of fragility, as if everything could fall at any minute". The dizzying effect was compounded by shifting lights and video projections of rushing clouds on the ceiling and floor, all accompanied by "atonal, slightly ominous music". Various "Missing Pieces" were exhibited elsewhere: Missing Pieces From A Fall of Corners #4 was shown at the 2016 Frieze Art Fair where it made the GQ list of "10 most Instagrammed artworks".

Her first solo museum exhibition, The Flat Side of the Knife, was organized by Mia Locks at the Museum of Modern Art PS1 in New York, and was accompanied by a catalogue of the same title distributed by D.A.P. The work filled the height of the museum's two-story Duplex Gallery and created extra space and levels by reflective surfaces, hidden platforms, and "Escheresque chambers". Three separate viewing stations were built into the work: on the lowest level was Golden's personal favorite, "a beat-up plaid couch that she drove in from her home town in Michigan". The Flat Side of the Knife stayed in exhibition from October 26, 2014, through September 1, 2015. It was Golden's largest work to that date, and the first for which she had to build a scale model. Artforum called it her "tour de force". Golden built a modified version of the work for the international exhibition Overpop (2016) at the Yuz Museum in Shanghai.

Golden's earlier works have been exhibited at the Museum of Contemporary Art, Los Angeles, the SculptureCenter in New York, and the 2014 Hammer Museum Biennial, Made in L.A.
