= Hannah Black =

British artist

- Born: Manchester, England
- Education: Whitney Independent Study Program, New York, 2014; Goldsmiths, University of London, (MFA) 2013; King's College, Cambridge
- Known for: Film, video, art and writing
- Notable work: Dark Pool Party
- Style: Mixed media artist
- Website: Vimeo accountTwitter account

Hannah Black is a British visual artist, critic, and writer. Her work spans video, text and performance.

== Early life ==
Black was born in 1981 in Manchester, England. She is currently based in New York City, though she has previously been based in Berlin and London. She studied at King's College, Cambridge, receiving a BA degree in English Literature in 2003, and publishing fiction in The May Anthologies 2003, edited by Ali Smith. In 2013, Black received a Masters of Fine Arts in art writing from Goldsmiths College, University of London.

== Career ==
After receiving her master's degree, Black lived in New York City from 2013-2014 where she was a studio participant in the Whitney Independent Study Program. According to Hatty Nestor in Art in America, "Hannah Black's practice deals primarily with issues of global capitalism, feminist theory, the body and sociopolitical spaces of control." She is represented by the London gallery Arcadia Missa. During her time in New York, Black was a contributing editor to the New York-based magazine, The New Inquiry. Two years later, her first collection of writing titled Dark Pool Party was published. The book consists of seven texts "that blur the lines of fiction, nonfiction, cultural criticism, critique, and poetry."

In March 2017, Black posted an open letter on her Facebook page to the curators of the Whitney Biennial in response to the painting Open Casket by American artist Dana Schutz. Black's letter advocated the removal of the painting with the additional "urgent recommendation" that it be destroyed. Black's letter became the focus of the ensuing debate around race, representation and notions of free speech that "split the art world". The controversy received international attention in both mainstream and art media.

In 2019, Black, Ciarán Finlayson, and Tobi Haslett released a statement in Artforum titled The Tear Gas Biennial, decrying the involvement of Warren Kanders, co-chair of the board of the Whitney Museum, and his "toxic philanthropy." Although Kanders has donated an estimated $10 million to the museum, the source of his fortune is derived from Safariland LLC, a company that manufactures riot gear, tear gas, and other chemical weapons used by the police and the military to enforce violent order. As of 1925, the Geneva Conventions have outlawed the use of tear gas in all international military conflicts, however, the tear gas fired at peaceful protesters and civilians by the police and military during the George Floyd protests as well as migrants on the US-Mexico border is the same brand of tear gas manufactured by Defense Technology, a subsidy of Safariland. A wave of artists from the Biennial, including Korakrit Arunanondchai, Meriem Bennani, Nicole Eisenman and Nicholas Galanin, demanded immediate removal of their work from the Biennial within hours after the essay was published. After mounting pressure from additional artists, critics, and patrons urging the public to boycott the show, Kanders stepped down from his leadership position at the museum. The essay was instrumental in Kanders resignation as well as the museum cutting ties with Kanders financial endowments that are directly connected to the promotion and use of military weaponry and violence during peaceful social unrest.

== Partial exhibition history ==
Hannah Black has participated in numerous solo and group exhibitions around the world including shows at Centre D’Art Contemporain in Geneva, Performance Space New York, Real Fine Arts, Derosia and the New Museum Theater in New York, Chisenhale Gallery and David Roberts Art Foundation, in London, mumok in Vienna, Arcadia Missa in Paris, Celaya Brothers Gallery in Mexico City, Sala Luis Miro Quesada Garland in Lima, Peru, Yarat Contemporary Art Centre, Baku, Azerbaijan, Chateau Shatto in Los Angeles and Transmission and David Dale Gallery in Glasgow. Black has had performances, screenings of her art and participated in talks at museums like MoMA PS1, Museum of Contemporary Art, Los Angeles, Swiss Institute Contemporary Art, New York and the Institute of Contemporary Arts, London
