= David Joselit =

American art historian

- Occupations: Art historian, author, critic
- Title: Professor of Art, Film, and Visual Studies

Academic background
- Education: Harvard University (AB, PhD); Massachusetts Institute of Technology

Academic work
- Discipline: Art history, visual studies
- Sub-discipline: Contemporary art, media theory, modernism
- Institutions: Harvard University; Graduate Center, CUNY; Yale University; University of California, Irvine; Massachusetts Institute of Technology
- Notable works: Infinite Regress: Marcel Duchamp 1910–1941; American Art Since 1945; Feedback: Television Against Democracy; After Art; Heritage and Debt: Art in Globalization; Art's Properties

David Joselit is an American art historian, critic, and curator known for his work on modern and contemporary art, media theory, and image circulation. Joselit is the Arthur Kingsley Porter Professor of Art, Film, and Visual Studies at Harvard University. He held positions at the City University of New York Graduate Center, where he served as a Distinguished Professor, and at Yale University, where he was the Carnegie Professor and Chair of the Department of History of Art. Joselit began his career as a curator at the Institute of Contemporary Art, Boston, and has since authored several widely cited books, including Infinite Regress: Marcel Duchamp 1910–1941 (1998), American Art Since 1945 (2003), Feedback: Television Against Democracy (2007), After Art (2012), Heritage and Debt: Art in Globalization (2020) which won the Robert Motherwell Book Award, and Art's Properties (2023). He is an editor of the journal October and a frequent contributor to Artforum.

== Early life and education ==
Joselit received both his bachelor's degree and Ph.D. in art history from Harvard University. He edited a poetry magazine called Padan Aram during his undergraduate years and has expressed fondness for the Woodberry Poetry Room in Harvard's Lamont Library.

== Career ==
Joselit served as a curator at the deCordova Sculpture Park and Museum in Lincoln, Massachusetts, and worked for several years as a curator at the Institute of Contemporary Art, Boston.

At Yale, Joselit was a Carnegie Professor and also a past Harris Lecturer at Northwestern University. He joined The Graduate Center of the City University of New York (CUNY) faculty in 2014. That same year, Joselit was named one of six faculty members promoted to Distinguished Professor at The Graduate Center of the City University of New York where he taught until 2020. He described the Center as “one of the most important educators of contemporary art historians.”

Joselit joined Harvard's Department of Art, Film, and Visual Studies (AFVS) in 2020 as a Professor of Visual Studies. At Harvard, he taught a seminar titled “Vision and Power: Introduction to Visual Studies,” examining how images convey meaning, power, and historical context.

Joselit formerly chaired the Department of the History of Art at Yale University.

On June 5, 2025, Joselit interviewed artist Rosa Barba about her solo exhibition at the Museum of Modern Art in New York, The Ocean of One's Pause, and the broader evolution of her practice.

=== On museums and online art platforms ===
Joselit argues that while “there's nothing like seeing a work of art in person,” virtual exhibitions can widen access and may change future art-world practices, potentially reducing the reliance on international art fairs. He was the co-curator Achim Hochdoerfer and Manuela of the exhibition Painting 2.0: Expression in the Information Age which opened at the Brandhorst Museum in Munich in 2016.

== Selected works ==
=== Books ===
- Infinite Regress: Marcel Duchamp 1910–1941 (MIT Press, 1998).
- American Art Since 1945 (Thames and Hudson, 2003).
- Feedback: Television Against Democracy. (MIT Press, 2007)
- After Art (Princeton University Press, 2012).
- Heritage and Debt: Art in Globalization (MIT Press, 2020)
- Art's Properties (Princeton University Press, 2023)

=== Interviews ===
- David Joselit with Greg Lindquist (The Brooklyn Rail, 2013)
- Interview: After Busan Biennale, Yale Art Historian Urges Art World to Think Local (Asia Society, February 7, 2013)
- David Joselit | Against Representation In conversation with David Andrew Tasman (Dismagazine, February/March 2015)
- An Art Historian Has A Solution for the Debates Over Representation and Identity (ARTnews, February 27, 2023)
- In Conversation: David Joselit & Cheyney Thompson on ‘Francis Picabia. Eternal Beginning (Hauser and Wirth, May 31, 2025
- From Medium to Material: Reframing Film with Rosa Barba and David Joselit (Independent, June 5, 2025)

=== Articles ===
- Joselit, David. "Notes on surface: Toward a genealogy of flatness." Art history 23.1 (2000): 19-34. doi:10.1111/1467-8365.00193
- Baker, George, et al. "Round table: The present conditions of art criticism." October 100 (2002): 201-228. JSTOR 779100
- Joselit, David. "Yippie Pop: Abbie Hoffman, Andy Warhol, and Sixties Media Politics." Grey Room 8 (2002): 63-79. JSTOR 1262608
- Joselit, David. "Navigating the new territory: art, avatars, and the contemporary mediascape." Artforum (Summer 2005) (2005): 276-279.
- Joselit, David. "No exit: video and the readymade." October 119 (2007): 37-45. JSTOR 40368457
- Joselit, David. "Painting beside itself." October 130 (2009): 125-134. JSTOR 40368572
- Joselit, David (Fall 2011). "What to Do with Pictures". October. 138: 81–94. ISSN 0162-2870.
- Joselit, David (Summer 2011). "Signal Processing: David Joselit on Abstraction Then and Now". Artforum.
- Joselit, David. "On Aggregators." October 146 (2013): 3-18.
- Joselit, David. "Heritage and Debt." October 171 (2020): 139-141. doi:10.1162/octo_a_00381
- Joselit, David. "NFTs, or the readymade reversed." October 175 (2021): 3-4. doi:10.1162/octo_a_00419
- Baker, George, and David Joselit, eds. "A questionnaire on global methods." October 180 (2022): 3-80. doi:10.1162/octo_a_00453/111539
