= 77th Street station (IRT Lexington Avenue Line) =

New York City Subway station in Manhattan

77 Street
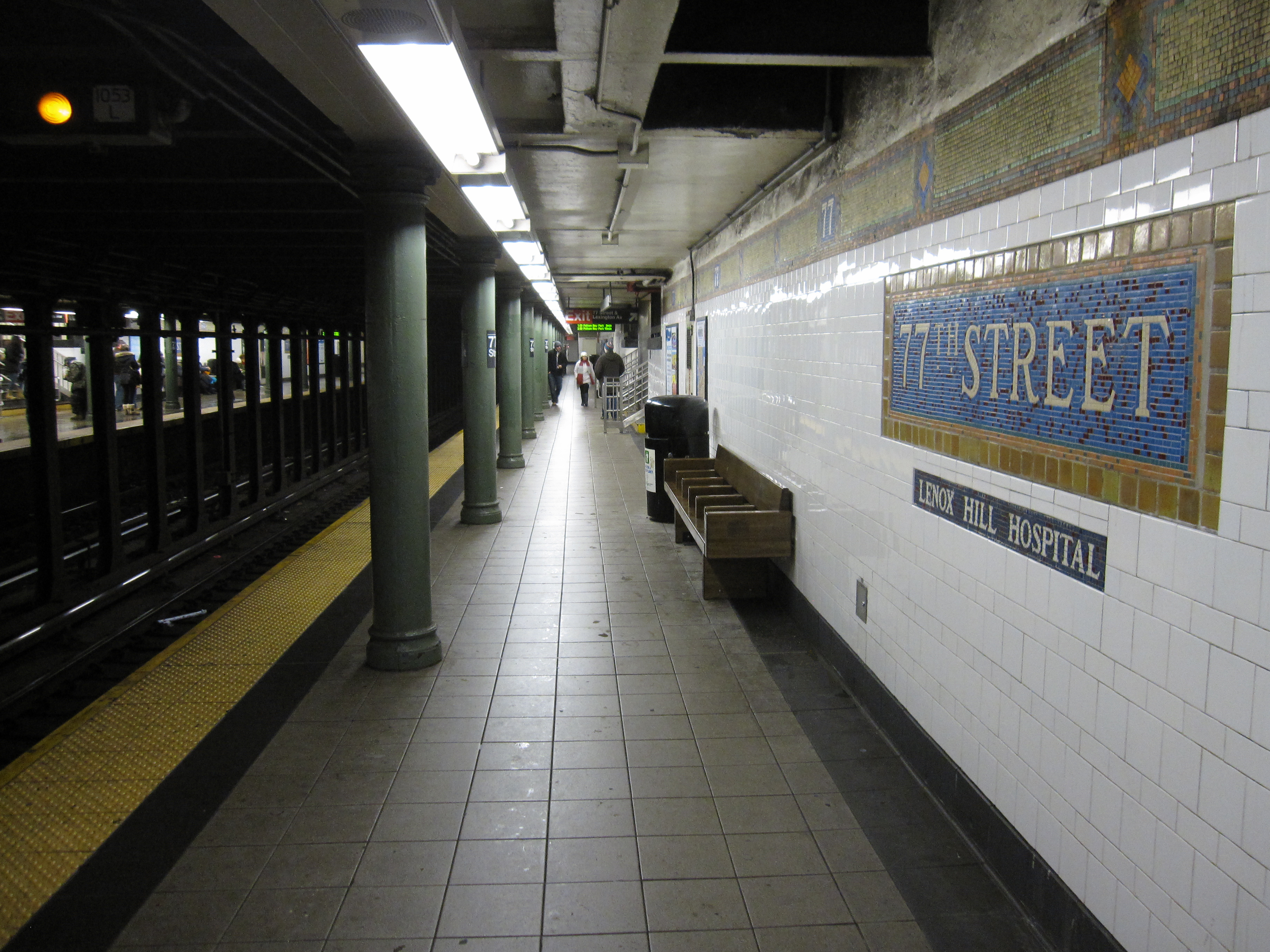
- Uptown platform

Station statistics
- Address: East 77th Street & Lexington Avenue; New York, New York
- Borough: Manhattan
- Locale: Upper East Side
- Coordinates: 40.773587°N 73.959875°W
- Division: A (IRT)
- Line: IRT Lexington Avenue Line
- Services: 4 (late nights); 6 (all times) <6> (weekdays until 8:45 p.m., peak direction)
- Transit: NYCT Bus: M101, M102, M103; M79 SBS at 79th Street; MTA Bus: BxM1
- Structure: Underground
- Platforms: 2 side platforms
- Tracks: 2

Other information
- Opened: July 17, 1918 (108 years ago)
- Former/other names: 77th Street–Lenox Hill Hospital

Traffic
- 2025: 6,594,725 ▲2.4%
- Rank: 35 out of 423
Services
Preceding station	New York City Subway	Following station
86th Street 4 6 <6> toward Pelham Bay Park	Local	68th Street–Hunter College 4 6 <6> toward Brooklyn Bridge–City Hall
does not stop here
Location
Location within New York City Subway
Location within New York City
Location within New York
Track layout
Street map
Station service legend
Symbol	Description
Stops all times	Stops all times
Stops late nights only	Stops late nights only
Stops rush hours in the peak direction only	Stops rush hours in the peak direction only

The 77th Street station (also known as 77th Street–Lenox Hill Hospital) is a local station on the IRT Lexington Avenue Line of the New York City Subway, located at the intersection of Lexington Avenue and 77th Street on the Upper East Side of Manhattan. It is served by the 6 train at all times, the <6> train during weekdays in the peak direction, and the 4 train during late nights.

This station was constructed as part of the Dual Contracts by the Interborough Rapid Transit Company and opened in 1918. The station was renovated in the 1950s, and from 2002 to 2004.

== History ==
=== Early history ===
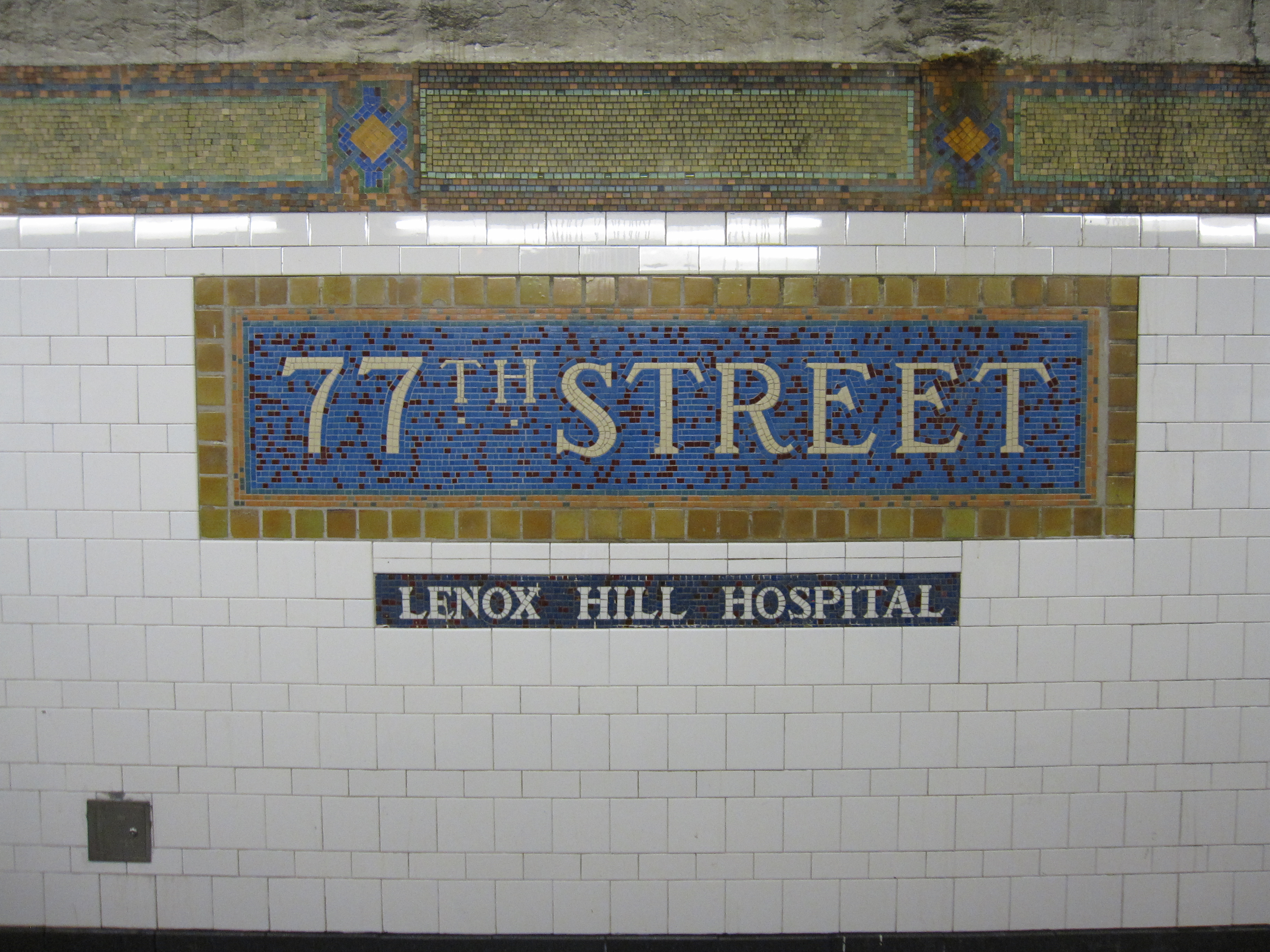
Station name in mosaics

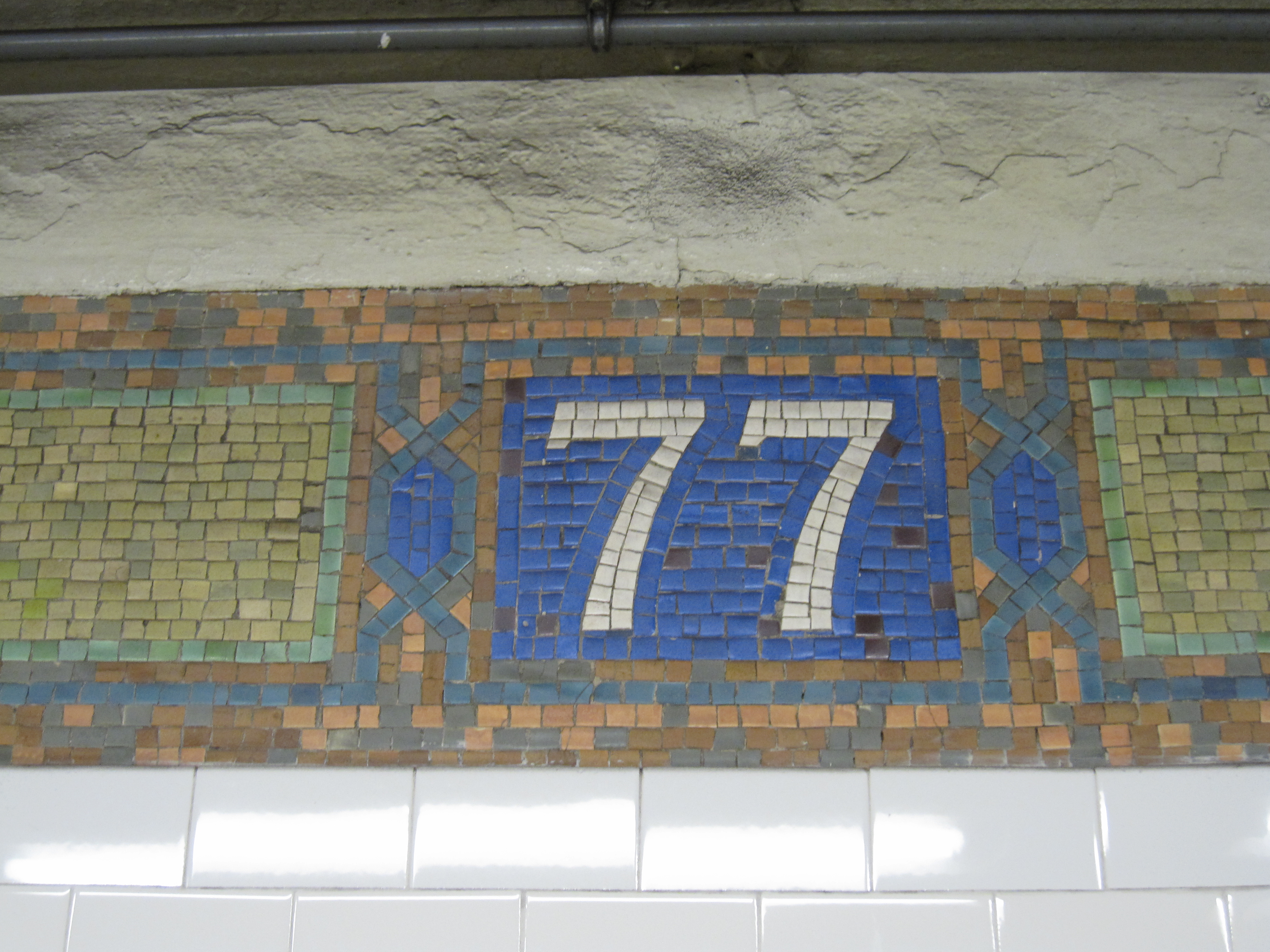
Mosaic frieze

Following the completion of the original subway, there were plans to construct a line along Manhattan's east side north of 42nd Street. The original plan for what became the extension north of 42nd Street was to continue it south through Irving Place and into what is now the BMT Broadway Line at Ninth Street and Broadway. In July 1911, the IRT had withdrawn from the talks, and the Brooklyn Rapid Transit Company (BRT) was to operate on Lexington Avenue. The IRT submitted an offer for what became its portion of the Dual Contracts on February 27, 1912.

In 1913, as part of the Dual Contracts, which were signed on March 19, 1913, the Public Service Commission planned to split the original Interborough Rapid Transit Company (IRT) system from looking like a "Z" system (as seen on a map) to an H-shaped system. The original system would be split into three segments: two north–south lines, carrying through trains over the Lexington Avenue and Broadway–Seventh Avenue Lines, and a west–east shuttle under 42nd Street. This would form a roughly H-shaped system. It was predicted that the subway extension would lead to the growth of the Upper East Side and the Bronx.

On September 19, 1917, the New York State Public Service Commission denied a request to change the planned name of the station to "77th Street—St. Ann's Academy".

The 77th Street station opened on July 17, 1918, with service initially running between Grand Central–42nd Street and 167th Street via the line's local tracks. On August 1, the "H system" was put into place, with through service beginning on the new east and west side trunk lines, and the institution of the 42nd Street Shuttle along the old connection between the sides. The cost of the extension from Grand Central was $58 million.

In July 1924, the IRT installed a change-making machine in the station. Along with turnstiles that accepted nickels, which were installed the previous year, this was expect to eliminate the need to have money changers in station booths.

In 1932, the New York State Transit Commission approved an application from Lenox Hill Hospital to install signs reading "Lenox Hill Hospital" on the walls of the station, on the condition that the hospital would pay for the cost of the sign installation.

=== Station renovations ===
The city government took over the IRT's operations on June 12, 1940.

The station was renovated in the 1950s to extend the station platforms to accommodate ten-car trains.

The NYCTA issued an invitation for bids on a project to construct additional entrances at the station on April 26, 1968. As part of the project, second staircases were added to each corner of 77th Street and Lexington Avenue. The contract was awarded to J. W. Jenkins, Incorporated for $409,726.

This station was renovated in 2003, along with the 86th Street and 116th Street stations on the Lexington Avenue Line. As part of the project, structural deficiencies were repaired, signage and lighting were enhanced, electrical service was upgraded, station facilities were rehabilitated, new fare arrays and a new token booth were installed, and portions of the station were upgraded to be compliant with the Americans with Disabilities Act of 1990. In addition, visual clutter was eliminated, and artwork was installed. The contract for the station renovation project, which was expected to take two year, was expected to be advertised in October 2000. The contract for these three stations was awarded in October 2001, and the projects were done in-house. The cost of the work at 77th Street station was $16.3 million, of which $12.3 million came from the Federal government.

=== Proposed accessibility improvements ===
In January 2023, Northwell Health, as part of its plan to expand Lenox Hill Hospital, submitted an application for a transit improvement density bonus. The agency proposed to make the downtown side of the station fully ADA-accessible by replacing two street stairs with one 15-foot (3 m) wide stair, enlarging public sidewalk space, improving station security and lighting systems, and installing two elevators: one from the street to the mezzanine, and another from the mezzanine to the platform. These improvements would allow the medical development to obtain a floor area ratio (FAR) bonus of 0.5; however, they still require Uniform Land Use Review Procedure (ULURP) review before being approved.

== Station layout ==
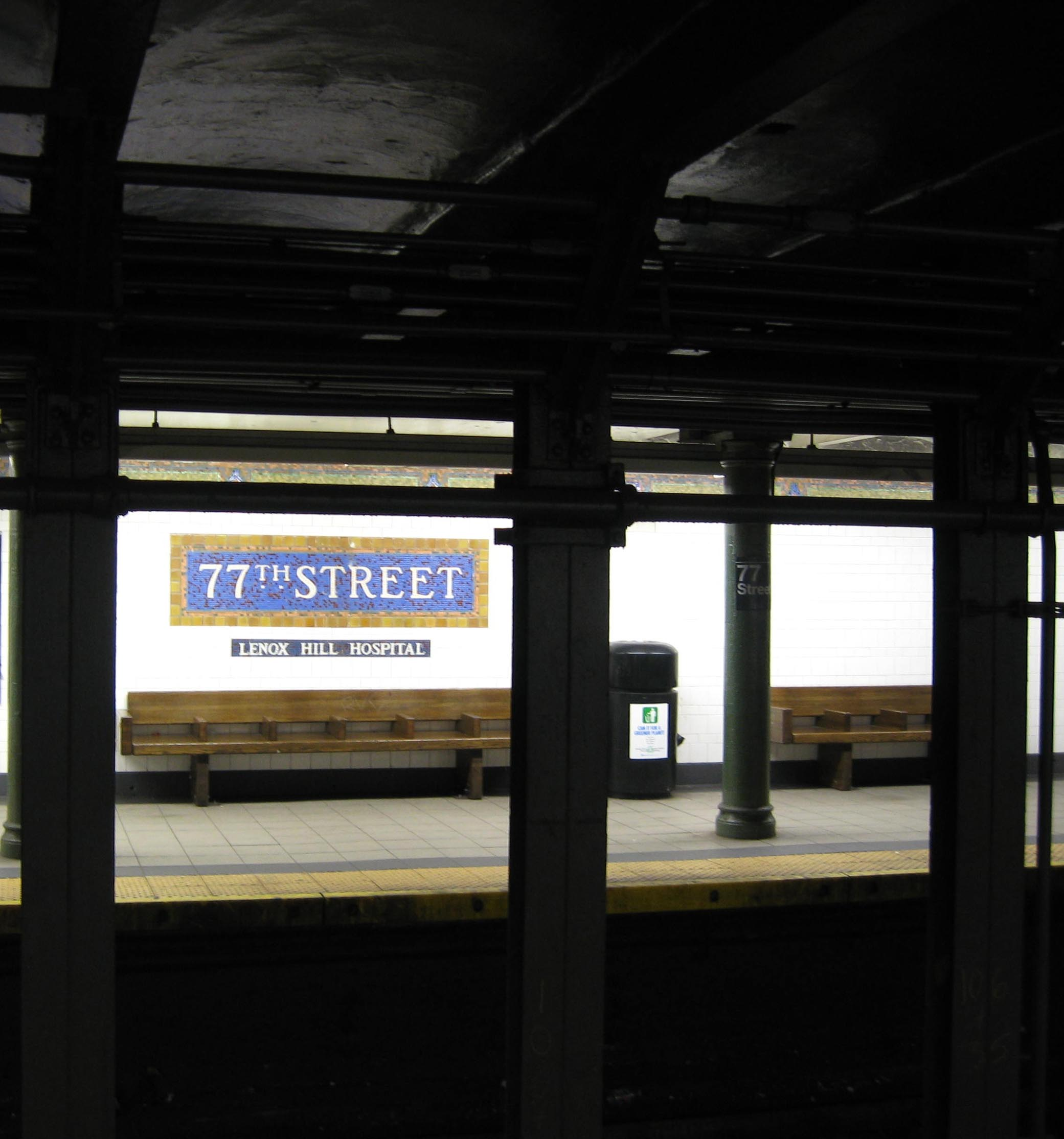
View of the Downtown platform

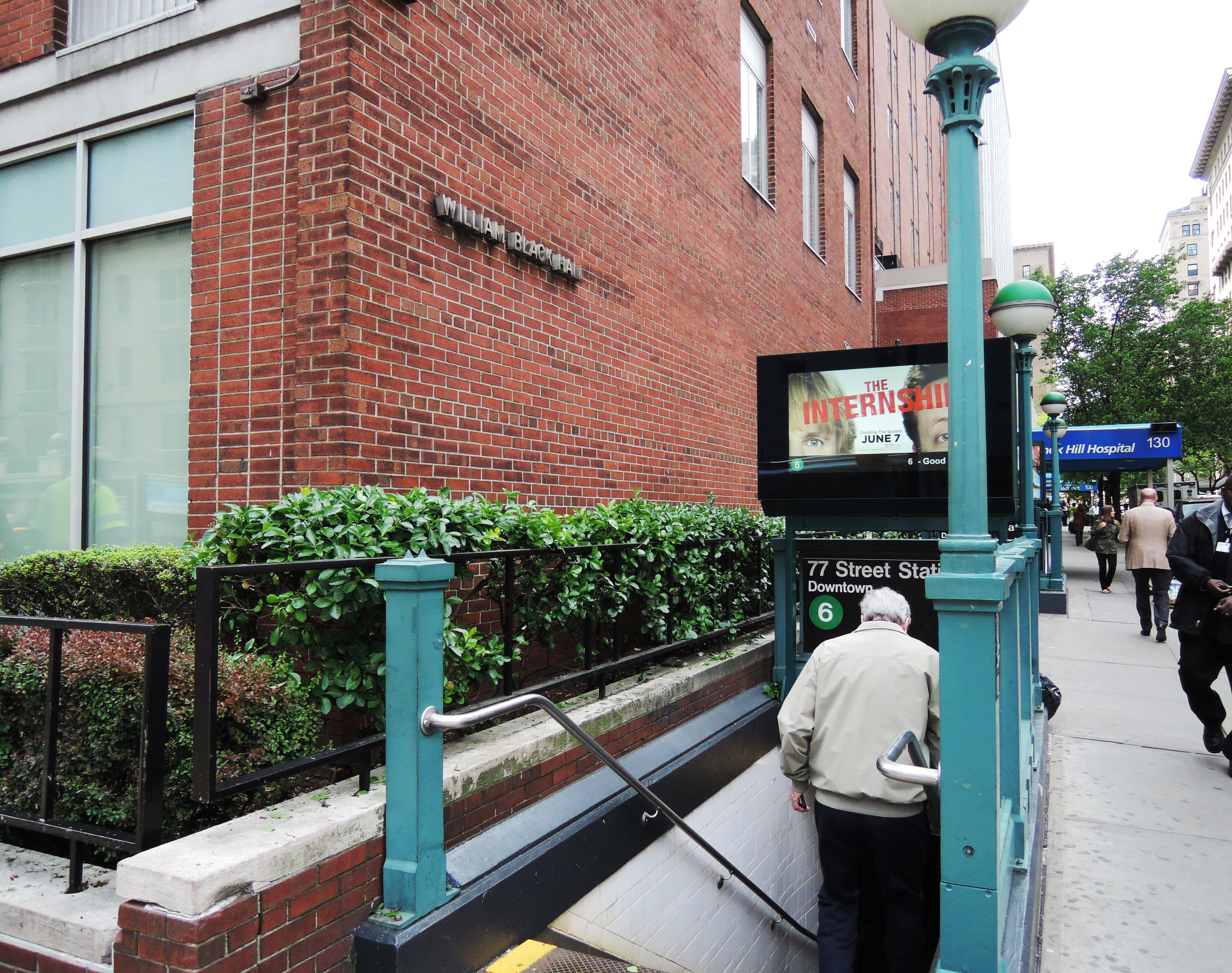
Southbound entrance

This station has two local tracks and two side platforms. The express tracks of the Lexington Avenue Line, used by the 4 and 5 trains during daytime hours, pass beneath the station and are not visible from the platforms. The 6 stops here at all times, and the 4 stops here during late nights. The station is between 86th Street to the north and 68th Street–Hunter College to the south.

There are round columns painted green along the length of both platforms. There are mosaic trim lines, and mosaic displaying the name of the station on the original sections of the station platforms. The remainders of both platforms have cream-colored tiles and a salmon trim line with "77TH ST" written on it in black Sans Serif font at regular intervals. These tiles were installed during the late 1950s renovation. Fixed platform barriers, which are intended to prevent commuters falling to the tracks, are positioned near the platform edges.

Some old wall lights exist after the station's renovation in 2003, but most are gone or falling off the walls. Both platforms have emergency exits from the lower level express tracks.

The 2004 artwork here is called 4 Seasons Seasoned by Robert Kushner. It is installed on the ceiling above the fare control staircases and features mosaics related to the four seasons of the year.

=== Exits ===
Both platforms has a fare control, and both areas have a turnstile bank, and four staircases to the street. The northbound side has a pair of staircases to both eastern corners of Lexington Avenue and 77th Street, while the southbound side has a pair of staircases to both western corners of Lexington Avenue and 77th Street. There are no crossovers or crossunders to allow free transfers between directions.

The downtown platform is the only platform in the station to house a token booth. The uptown platform token booth was closed by the Metropolitan Transportation Authority after making a series of layoffs and has been removed.

== Nearby landmarks ==
- Lenox Hill Hospital
- Hunter College School of Social Work
