= Lisa Corinne Davis =

American painter

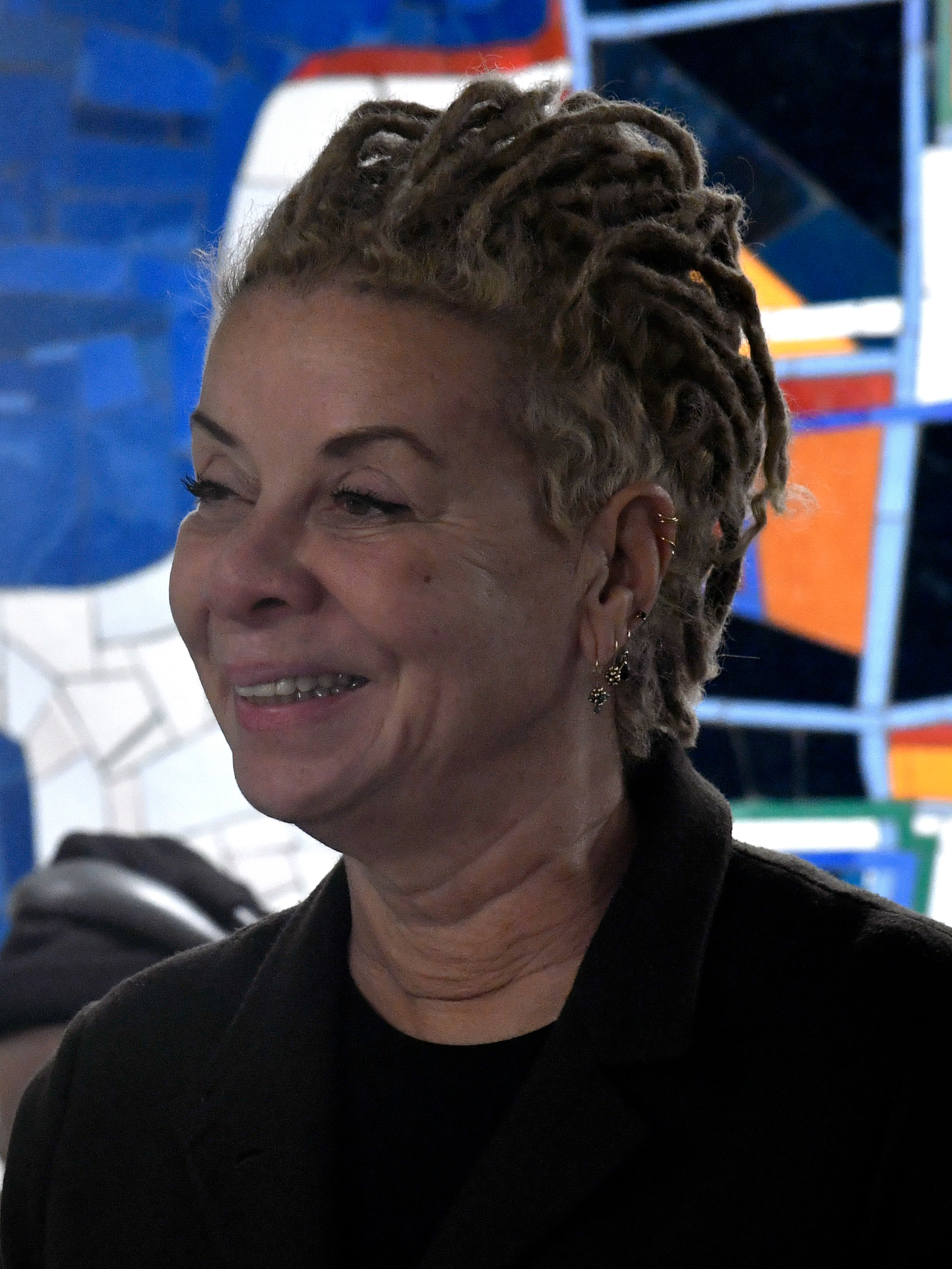
- Lisa Corinne Davis
- Born: Baltimore, Maryland, United States
- Education: Hunter College, Pratt Institute, Cornell University
- Known for: Painting, drawing, writing, curating
- Awards: Guggenheim Fellowship, American Academy of Arts and Letters, Pollock-Krasner, Louis Comfort Tiffany, National Endowment for the Arts
- Website: Lisa Corinne Davis

Lisa Corinne Davis, Psychotropic Turf, oil on canvas, 54.25" x 40", 2015.

Lisa Corinne Davis is an American visual artist known for abstract paintings and works on paper that suggest maps and other encoded forms of knowledge. She employs abstraction as a means of rendering the complexities of contemporary experience—including her own as an African-American woman—often questioning preconceived notions about identity, classification, and rationality versus subjectivity. Her densely layered, colorful work merges contrasting schemas, visual elements and formal languages, blurring distinctions between figuration and abstraction, real and fictive spaces and concepts, and microcosmic or macrocosmic reference. Brooklyn Rail critic Joan Waltemath wrote, "The urban experiences of space and time that Davis presents are subtle distillations of moment and coincidence ... Her attempt to map the shattered terrain of contemporary life points both to an awareness of other times and a belief in navigating the present one."

In 2022, Davis was awarded a Guggenheim Fellowship. She has also received awards from institutions including the American Academy of Arts and Letters, Pollock-Krasner and Louis Comfort Tiffany foundations, and National Endowment for the Arts. Her work belongs to the public collections of the Museum of Modern Art, Philadelphia Museum of Art, Fine Arts Museums of San Francisco, and Victoria and Albert Museum (London), among others. She lives and works in Brooklyn and Hudson, New York and is a professor of art at Hunter College.

== Early life and career ==
Davis was born in Baltimore, Maryland. She and her brother were raised by their mother after their father died when Davis was four. Her mother worked two jobs in order to send her children to a private, otherwise all-white Quaker school; she also earned a PhD and a JD, becoming one of the first African-American women in Maryland to do so. Davis attended Cornell University for two years before enrolling as a painting major at Pratt Institute in 1978 and earning a BFA in 1980. She went to graduate school at Hunter College, studying with Lynda Benglis, Ron Gorchov and Rosalind Krauss, among others, on the way to earning an MFA in 1983.

Davis began receiving recognition in the 1990s, for exhibitions at Art in General, Bronx Museum of The Arts, and Aljira, among others. She also began teaching at that time, serving at Parsons School of Design, Cooper Union, Yale University, and beginning in 2002, Hunter College, where she co-directs the MFA Studio Art program.

== Work and reception ==
Critic Karen Wilkin has written that Davis "courts ambiguity and multivalent associations" through an "inventive abstract language" informed by personal experience, social observation and the history of art. Her map-like compositions simultaneously evoke and undermine systems of coding and categorizing race, identity and knowledge, privileging complexity, contingency and the primacy of direct, individual understanding and perception over collective, often essentialist frameworks. She does so by counterposing divergent structures and artistic forms in order to navigate between ideas of rationality and order and modes of expressivity, subjectivity and chaos. Her mark-making fuses two kinds of abstract language: line—as used objectively in geometry, mathematics and grids—and gesture, typically regarded in terms of affective expression (e.g., in Abstract Expressionism). In a similar way, she employs both objective, "natural" color and expressive, sometimes artificial color, moving between descriptive and psychological modes. Such juxtapositions also play out in the titles of her works, which frequently merge "factually" grounded words (territory, atlas, computation, position) with internal, subjective words (specious, psychopathic, metaphysical, impersonation).

Lisa Corinne Davis, (Black) Heritage Search #5, ink, graphite, colored pencil, 11" x 11", 1990.

=== Early mixed-media work (1990–2003) ===
Davis's early mixed-media work used visual analogies to examine race, the quest for individual identity, and distinctions between self and other, individual and group. This work included ink self-portraits—which she covered with graphite, leaving only ghostly figural images below semi-reflective surfaces—and wall pieces and objects that combined raw construction with delicate painted imagery. Essential Traits No. 1 (1996) was a representative early work, constructed out of pages from an old American history text, overwritten with new text that conveyed the constraints on identity posed by racially derived cultural assumptions.

In solo shows at June Kelly (1998), Lehman College (2001) and Marlborough Gallery (2003), Davis produced obsessive, elaborately layered collage-style works that wedded modernist abstraction and postmodern content. They were created out of hundreds of variable elements taken from magazines, novels and history books: multiracial headshots, cutouts of eyes, multicultural alphabet signs, maps and fingerprints, reproduced in a palette approximating a range of skin tones. She combined them into large, quilt- or chart-like compositions that abstracted systems of categorization while blurring reductive labels in favor of an individualistic view of social complexity. New York Times critic Ken Johnson wrote that this work "meditated with poetic indirection on race, culture, history and geography," while Holland Cotter described it as a blend of "pointed information and good-looking painting."

=== Painting (2005– ) ===
Lisa Corinne Davis, Doodle Verité, oil on panel, 30" x 22", 2007.

In the 2000s, Davis staked out an increasingly abstract and fluid position in canvases that resembled maps or networks and explored systemic, documentary and narrative impulses. Situated more purely in painting, they dispensed with collage elements but retained that aesthetic through a dense layering of imagery and techniques. Davis approached subject matter in a more subtle, open-ended manner balanced with formal concerns, expanding earlier examinations of racial, gender and identity codes into evocations of wider knowledge systems, often revealed as contingent and futile in terms of their ability to capture the plurality of life.

The paintings in her show "Fact & Fiction" (June Kelly, 2007) combined skeins of curling lines, flat cartoonish shapes, and passages of spilled or squeezed paint, layered over backgrounds of blue, white, and green squares. The lines suggested skewed latitude and longitude grids or organic webs, while the flat shapes resembled landmasses or plant, insect and anatomical forms, accumulating details suggesting the technical and the handmade (e.g., Mutant Schema, 2006; Doodle Verité, 2007). Davis painted them with an eye-catching, sometimes artificial palette that departed from the more somber earth and flesh tones of her past work; at times, the color emitted an unsettling or poisonous aura, evoking burst corpuscles, cellular malignancies, fire or lethal sludge, as with the feverish, red-orange smears and shapes in works such as Verifiably Metaphysical and Regulatory Plasma (both 2007). Art in America 's Lilly Wei wrote, Davis's "riddled maps seem both familiar and not, suggesting aerial views of enigmatic terrain, details of a landscape in toxic erosion … an updated War of the Worlds [schema] or a blueprint of our ecological madness."

In exhibitions between 2010 and 2017—at Lesley Heller, Spanierman Modern, Galerie Gris and Gerald Peters (New York), Zolla/Lieberman (Chicago), and Mayor Gallery (London)—Davis extended the complexity of her themes and abstract syntaxes. Her proliferating forms—seemingly drawn from microscopic and macroscopic realms (cells, roads, maps, city grids, geographic fault lines), as well as the mechanical world of circuits and motherboards—charted concepts encompassing the urban experience of space and time, the fragmentation of contemporary life, and the diverse, intersecting strands of identity. Critics described them as "haphazardly rendered topographies or warped atlas pages" delicately balanced between organic chaos and linear order, whose titles (e.g., Psychopathic Territory and Psychotropic Turf, both 2015) undermined their reliability as maps. Joan Waltemath suggested these ideas were offset by humor and irreverence, expressed through Davis's use of outline as a kind of doodling gesture in works such as Flim Flam Plan (2015).

Reviews identified a deliberate, increasingly unstable quality of collapse or collision in the paintings in Davis's show "All Shook Up" (Pamela Salisbury, 2020). Its fifteen vertically oriented, vibrant works combined warped and decomposing grids, puzzle-like shapes, abutting planes and linear bands, placed in off-balance, syncopated rhythms and depthless space. Critics such as John Yau and Karen Wilkin suggested that their visual schemas and intentionally elusive titles (Registered Impersonation, 2020; Captious Computation, 2019) summoned a range of contradictory associations—natural to man-made, ephemeral and organic to technological—as well as allusions to corporate and governmental intrusion into private life. Yau wrote, "the artist’s ability to call forth the invisible world, in which we are constantly leaving traces of our presence, injects an unexpected and much-needed jolt into abstraction"; Wilkin suggested the paintings evoked "the long views inherent in mapping and the intimacy of textiles."

== Awards and public collections ==
Davis has received a Guggenheim Fellowship (2022) and awards from the Pollock-Krasner Foundation, New York Foundation for the Arts, Louis Comfort Tiffany Foundation, Bronx Museum of the Arts, National Endowment for the Arts, and Mid-Atlantic Arts Foundation, among others. She was named a member of the American Academy of Arts and Letters in 2021 and an academician of the National Academy of Design in 2017. She has been awarded artist residencies at Yaddo, Dora Maar House (Brown Foundation/Museum of Fine Arts, Houston), Siena Arts Institute (Italy), and MacDowell.

Her work belongs to the public collections of the Museum of Modern Art, Philadelphia Museum of Art, Fine Arts Museums of San Francisco, J. Paul Getty Museum, Montclair Art Museum, National Museum of Women in the Arts, New York Public Library, Rose Art Museum, Schomburg Center for Research in Black Culture, Sheldon Museum of Art, Victoria and Albert Museum, and the U.S. Department of State, as well as to corporate, university and college collections.

== Other professional activities ==
Davis has written essays on art and culture for Artforum, Artcritical and The Brooklyn Rail. Her topics have included blackness, feminist imagery, the artists Robert Reed and Niccolò di Pietro, the Dana Schutz painting Open Casket, and what she termed "Neo-Romanticism" in young artists' work. Her essay, "Towards a More Fluid Definition of Blackness" (2016), examined the art-world racial divide and constraints on the expression of black experience, including expectations that the work of black artists should embody overtly political representations of blackness.

Davis has curated exhibitions at Lesley Heller, the Hunter College Times Square Gallery (with Susan Crile), and Gerald Peters. The latter exhibition, "Representing Rainbows" (2016), was inspired by a 2014 article she wrote regarding the increasing appearance and meaning of rainbows—both a cliché symbol and a sublime phenomenon—in student work.
