= M72 (New York City bus) =

Bus route in Manhattan, New York

m72
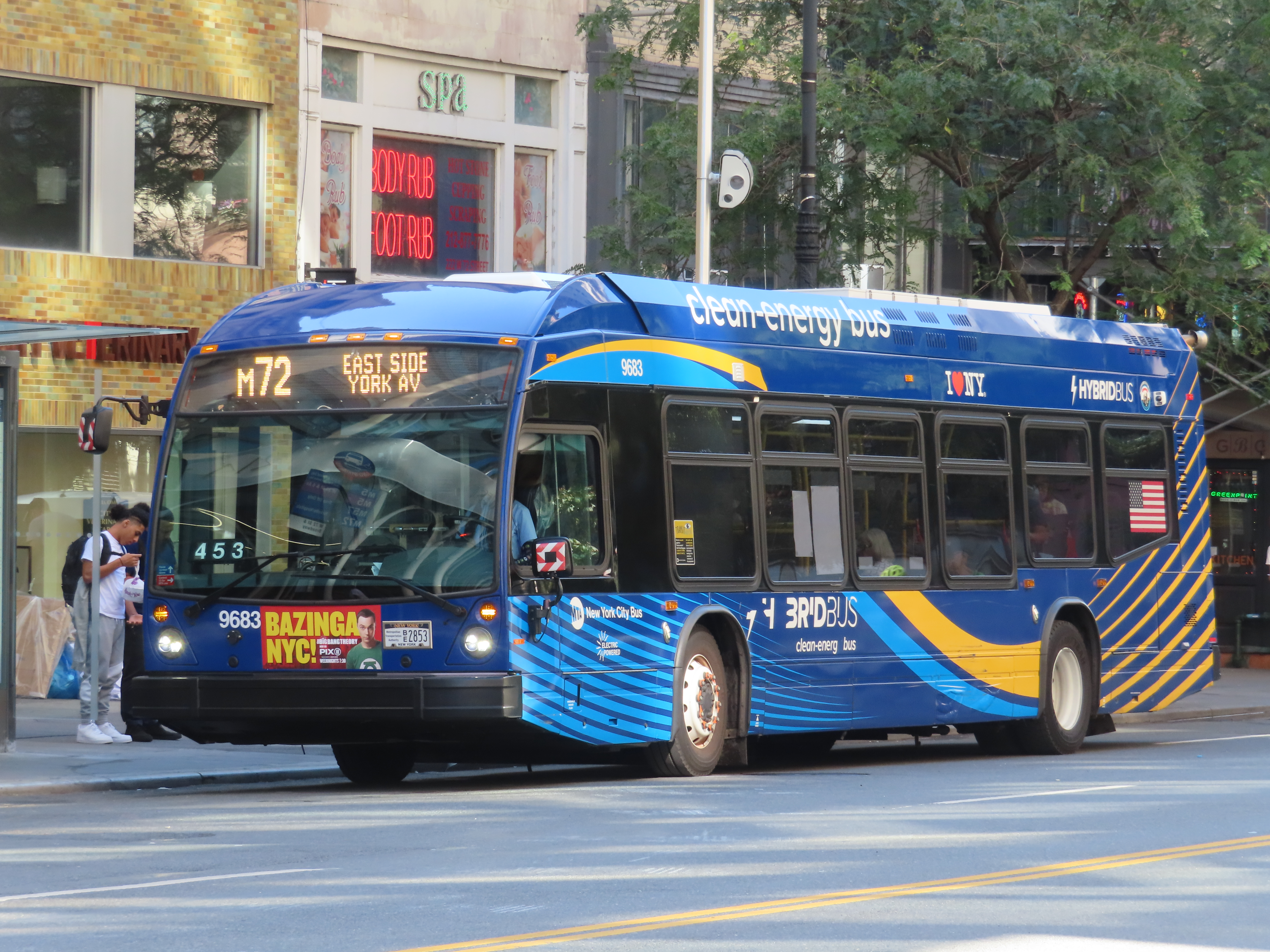
- A 2021 Nova Bus LFS HEV (9683) on the Upper East Side-bound M72

Overview
- System: MTA Regional Bus Operations
- Operator: Manhattan and Bronx Surface Transit Operating Authority
- Garage: Michael J. Quill Depot
- Vehicle: New Flyer Xcelsior XD40; New Flyer Xcelsior XE40; Nova Bus LFS HEV
- Began service: September 10, 1989

Route
- Locale: Manhattan, New York, U.S.
- Communities served: Upper West Side, Lincoln Square, Upper East Side, Lenox Hill
- Start: Upper West Side - 66th Street & Freedom Place
- Via: 72nd Street
- End: Upper East Side – 72nd Street & York Avenue
- Length: 3.0 miles (4.8 km)
- Other routes: M66 66th/67th Streets Crosstown

Service
- Operates: All times except late nights
- Annual patronage: 1,073,227 (2025)
- Transfers: Yes
- Timetable: M72

The M72 bus route constitutes a public transit line in Manhattan, running crosstown on 72nd Street from the Upper East Side to the Upper West Side.

== Route description ==
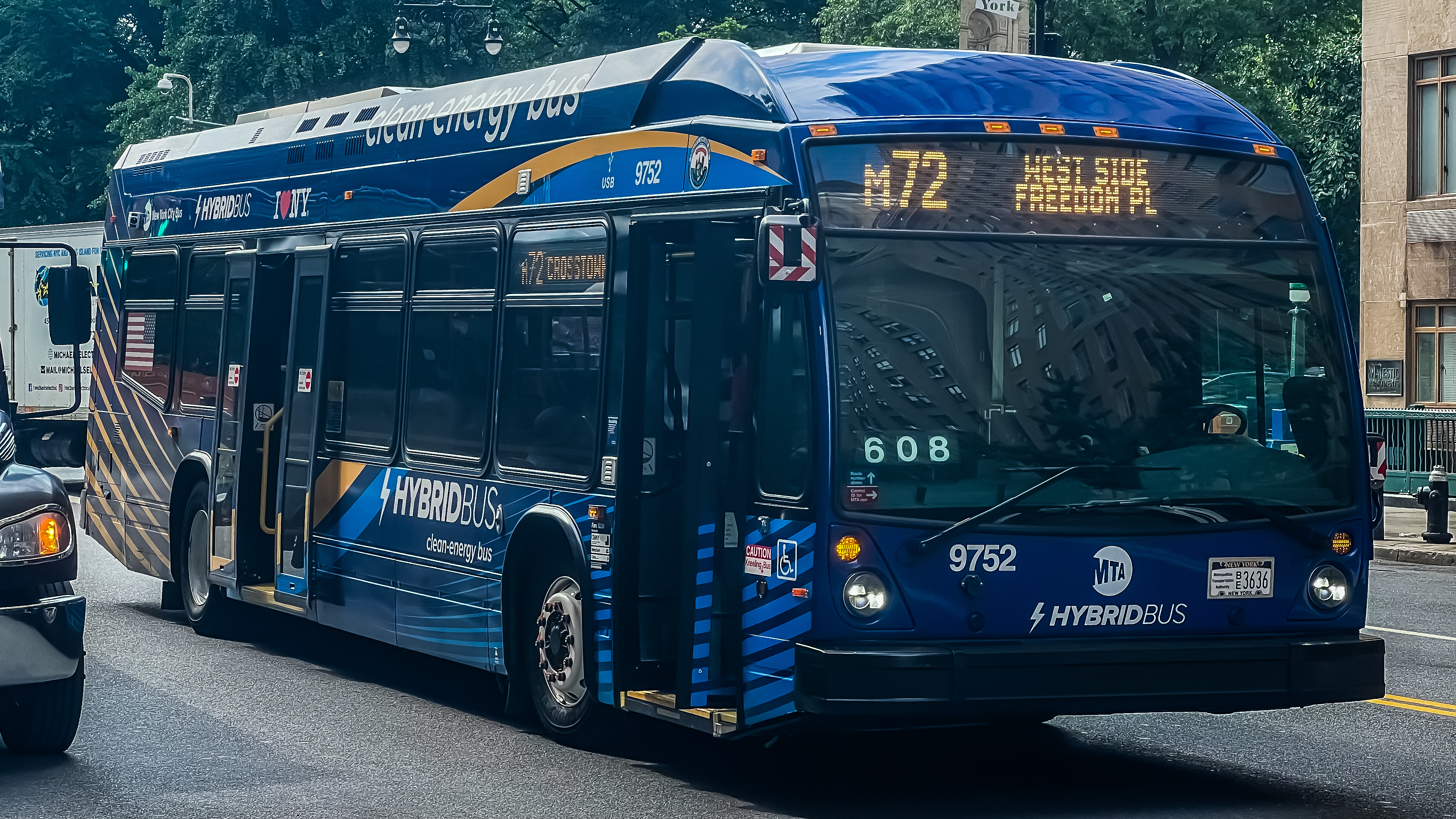
A 2021 Nova Bus LFS HEV (9752) on the Upper West Side-bound M72 in June 2024

The westbound M72 starts at 72nd Street and York Avenue, looping around via York Avenue, 71st Street and First Avenue, before turning west onto 72nd Street, until 5th Avenue. Due to there not being a transverse at 72nd Street, the M72 runs south on 5th Avenue to use the 65th Street Transverse, alongside the M72, using Central Park West to return to 72nd Street. It continues west on 72nd Street until West End Avenue, continuing south and then west on 70th Street. It then continues west and then south on Riverside Boulevard until making a right turn and terminating onto Freedom Place.

The eastbound M72 starts at 66th Street and Freedom Place. It runs north on Freedom Place and then east onto 70th Street, where it follows the route of the westbound M72 until 5th Avenue, where it continues east on 65th Street and uses Madison Avenue northbound to get to 72nd Street, before running east on 72nd Street until its terminus at York Avenue.

== History ==
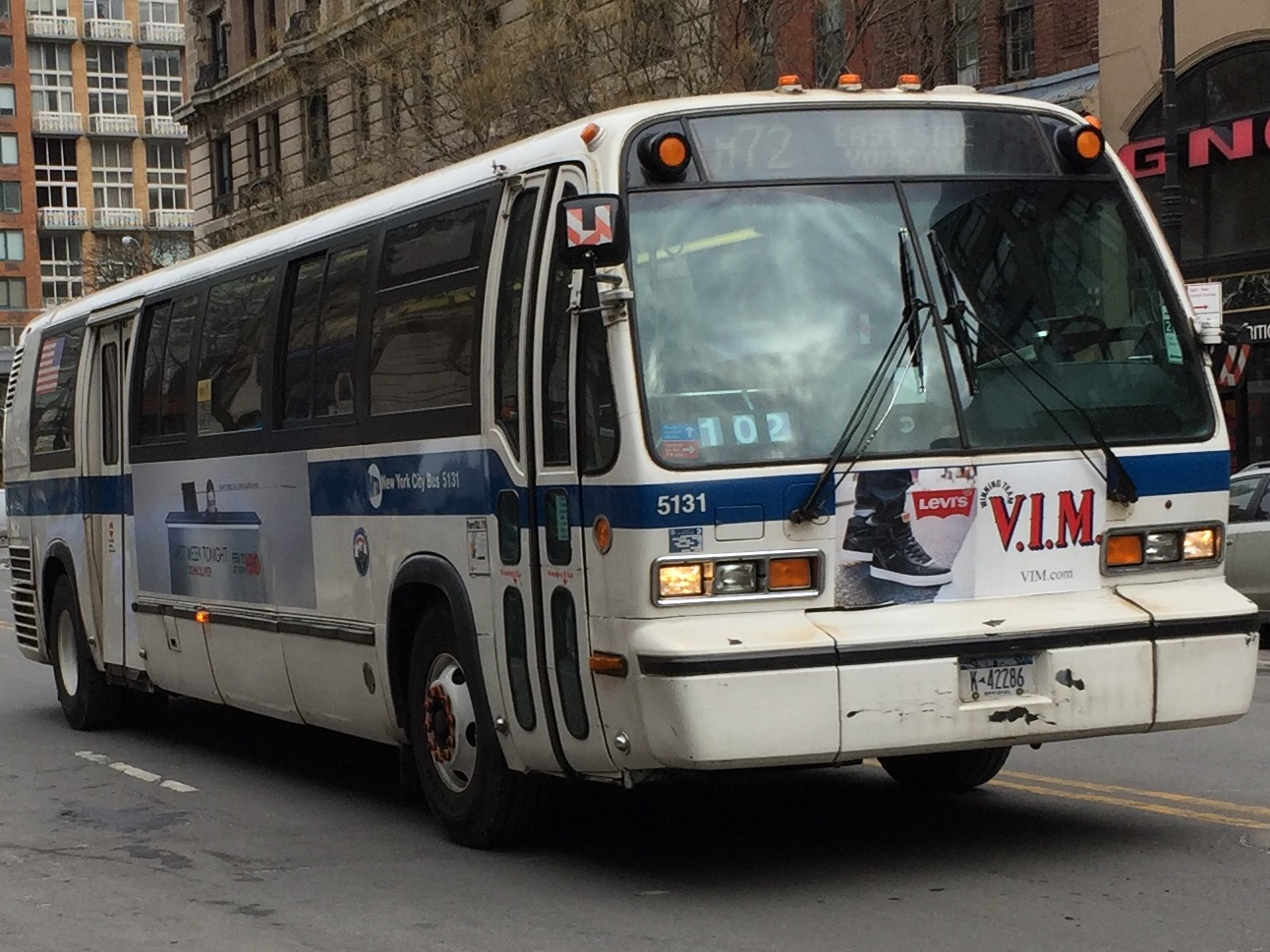
A 1999 Nova Bus RTS-06 (5131) on the Upper East Side-bound M72 along 72nd Street

The M72 bus service was started on September 10, 1989 in order to provide crosstown service on 72nd Street, a major arterial road, from 72nd Street and York Avenue to 66th Street and Freedom Place, deviating to the 65th Street Transverse to travel through Central Park.

In 1998, the Metropolitan Transportation Authority (MTA) proposed rerouting the M72 line to Riverside Boulevard at its western end to serve the then-new Riverside South development; this would eliminate two bus stops near Amsterdam and Lincoln House, two developments with a high population of elderly people. Opponents of the reroute claimed that elderly residents would have to walk as much as four blocks to the new bus stops, whereas Riverside South residents would have to walk only one block to the existing bus stops. Nonetheless, the reroute was approved in 1998. Residents claimed that Riverside South's developer Donald Trump had influenced the reroute, but the New York City Transit Authority said the change would increase daily ridership by about 200. At West End Avenue, the westbound M72 bus traveled south for six blocks, west on 66th Street, and north on Freedom Place for six blocks.

In 2002, the M72 was truncated at its western end. Buses traveled south on West End Avenue only as far as 70th Street, where they turned west; eastbound buses used Riverside Boulevard to travel back to 72nd Street. Two discontinued bus stops on West End Avenue were taken over by the M57 route. On December 20, 2009, due to New York City Department of Transportation construction on West 72nd Street, service was changed to its current terminus. Previously, M72 buses had terminated on 68th Street, however, this change was put in effect due to congestion on 68th Street and westbound service was accordingly moved from 68th Street to 66th Street.
