= Mia Locks =

American independent curator and writer

Mia Locks is a contemporary art curator, museum leader, and Executive Director of Museums Moving Forward (MMF).

== Career ==
=== Professional Experience ===
Mia Locks is an independent curator based in Los Angeles. She co-founded and leads Museums Moving Forward, a data-driven research initiative to support equity in the art museum sector, funded by Ford Foundation and Mellon Foundation. She serves on the board of the Center for Art, Research, and Alliances (CARA) in New York and Foreman Arts in Philadelphia. She was an editorial advisor on the podcasts "Hope & Dread: The Tectonic Shifts of Power in Art." " and The Art World: What If...?!"

Locks' recent exhibitions include The Deep West Assembly Cauleen Smith (2024) at Astrup Fearnley Museet in Oslo and Miranda July: New Society (2024) at Fondazione Prada in Milan. Previously, Locks worked as a curator at The Museum of Contemporary Art, Los Angeles (MOCA); Whitney Museum of American Art, New York; and MoMA PS1, New York. Most recently, she was Senior Curator and Head of New Initiatives at the Museum of Contemporary Art, Los Angeles. Prior to MOCA, Locks was co-curator of the 2017 Whitney Biennial, with Christopher Y. Lew. At MoMA PS1, she organized exhibitions including Math Bass: Off the Clock (2015); IM Heung-soon: Reincarnation (2015); Samara Golden: The Flat Side of the Knife (2014); and The Little Things Could Be Dearer (2014). She also co-curated Greater New York (2015), with Douglas Crimp, Peter Eleey, and Thomas J. Lax. As an independent curator, she organized Ulrike Müller: or both (2019) at Moore College of Art & Design in Philadelphia, and Cruising the Archive: Queer Art and Culture in Los Angeles, 1945–1980 (2011), with David Evans Frantz, at the ONE National Gay & Lesbian Archives in Los Angeles, as part of the Getty’s inaugural Pacific Standard Time initiative.

=== Writing and Teaching ===
Locks’ writing includes a biannual report on Workplace Equity and Organizational Culture in US Art Museums, published by Museums Moving Forward. Her writing has also included articles for Artnet, Mousse, Afterall, Art Journal, and several exhibition catalogue texts on artists such as Miranda July, Math Bass, Samara Golden, Shara Hughes, William Pope.L, and Carrie Moyer. She edited the first monograph of Samara Golden's work, The Flat Side of the Knife, published by MoMA PS1 in 2014. She served on the faculty of the M.A. program in Curatorial Practice at the School of Visual Arts, New York from 2017-2019.

=== Education ===
Locks received a BA from Brown University and an MA from the University of Southern California (USC). She was a 2018 fellow at the Center for Curatorial Leadership in New York City.
