= Dana Schutz =

American painter (born 1976)

- Born: 1976 (age 49–50); Livonia, Michigan, U.S.
- Education: Cleveland Institute of Art, Columbia University
- Known for: Painting and sculpture.

Dana Schutz (born 1976 in Livonia, Michigan) is an American artist who lives and works in Brooklyn, New York. Schutz is known for her gestural, figurative paintings that often take on specific subjects or narrative situations as a point of departure.

== Early life and education ==
Schutz was born and grew up in Livonia, Michigan, a suburb of Detroit. Her mother was an art teacher in a junior high school and an amateur painter, her father a high school counselor. An only child, Schutz graduated in 1995 from Adlai E. Stevenson High School. In 1999, while pursuing her BFA at the Cleveland Institute of Art, Schutz then went abroad to attend the Norwich School of Art and Design in Norwich, England. That same year, she participated in Maine's Skowhegan School of Painting and Sculpture residency program, and in 2000 completed her BFA upon her return to Cleveland. In 2002, Schutz received her MFA from Columbia University in New York City.

== Work ==
Dana Schutz, Shoe, 2002, Oil on canvas, 16 x 20 inches

Schutz first came to attention in 2002 with her debut exhibition Frank from Observation (2002) at LFL gallery (which then became Zach Feuer Gallery). This show was based on the conceit of Schutz as the last painter, representing the last subject "Frank". Since then her fictive subjects have ranged from people who can eat themselves, a gravity fanatic, imaginary births and deaths, public/private performers, awkward situations, and mundane objects. On the occasion Schutz's museum retrospective at the Neuberger Museum, New York Times critic Karen Rosenberg wrote: "Ms. Schutz has become a reliable conjurer of wickedly grotesque creatures and absurd situations, willed into existence by her vigorous and wildly colorful brush strokes." She concludes, "Again and again Ms. Schutz has challenged herself to come up with a subject that's too awkward, gross, impractical or invisible to paint. But she has yet to find one that stumps her." In Shoe, 2002, Dana Schutz portrays a single grey shoe above a sticky blue material that resembles gum, seemingly stuck on a bold orange traffic line.

When asked where she comes up with her subject matter, Schutz told Mei Chin of Bomb magazine: "The paintings are not autobiographical [...] I respond to what I think is happening in the world. The hypotheticals in the paintings can act as surrogates or narratives for phenomena that I feel are happening in culture. In the paintings, I think in terms of adjectives and adverbs. Often I will get information from people or things that I see, a phrase, or how one object relates to another. I construct the paintings as I go along."

Jörg Heiser, who has compared Schutz to Austrian painter Maria Lassnig, describes the work in his 2008 book All of a Sudden: "Her canvases are 'too big,' the way showy gold chains are too big, but also skeptical and at times bad-tempered, the way intelligent teenagers are in their loathing of the bland aestheticism and brash sexuality of pop-modernity". With regard to color, Heiser adds: "Schutz's pictures favor a carefully chosen palette of vomit and mold and rot, between pink and purple, turquoise and olive, ocher and crap."

In an essay for Schutz's catalog, Dana Schutz: Paintings 2002–2005, New York–based curator Katy Siegel addressed Schutz's work as paintings that "speak so vividly of their making," claiming that the paintings are an "allegory for the process of making art." Siegel goes on to write "by rendering the process of creation as one of drawing on oneself, recycling oneself and making oneself, Schutz creates a model of creation that blurs beginnings and endings, avoiding the dramatic genesis of the modernist blank canvas, as well as the nihilistic cul-de-sac of the appropriated media image."

In 2012 Schutz presented her exhibition Piano in the Rain at Petzel Gallery in New York. In her review of the show, New York Times critic Roberta Smith praised it, writing: "More than ever, Ms. Schutz seems to want every stroke and smudge of paint to register separately so that you can see through to the bare canvas and reconstruct her every move as she fearlessly tackles life's flux."

Schutz has shown sculptures in 2019 at Petzel Gallery in New York that were first made in clay and then cast in bronze. Schutz's work was included in the 2022 exhibition Women Painting Women at the Modern Art Museum of Fort Worth.

=== Frank From Observation ===
Held at Zach Feuer Gallery from November 23, 2002, to January 13, 2003, Schutz's exhibition Frank from Observation focuses on Frank: a middle-aged, pink male. In this exhibition, Frank acts as Schutz's imagination, imparting Schutz's idea of what the last man on Earth might look like, if she were the last observer. Schutz describes Frank as: "a character that I invented. He was the last man on earth and I was the last audience and his last witness. He would pose for me and I would make other people and events out of him."

One interpretation of Schutz's exhibit is the chance to start anew; no laws, no society, and no one else to hold oneself accountable.

In an interview with Mei Chin from Bomb Magazine, Schutz said her inspiration for this collection came from the question, "What would this person look like if there was only one other person on earth to say what he looked like?" Schutz continues her explanation with her perception of achieved sanity, "There is this sense that you always need someone else to check reality with."

=== Open Casket ===
Dana Schutz' painting of the corpse of Emmett Till, titled Open Casket, drew protests when shown in the 2017 Whitney Biennial, and there were demands that it be removed from the show.

Schutz's 2016 painting Open Casket derives from the photograph of the mutilated corpse of Emmett Till, whose mother, Mamie Till Mobley, insisted on an open casket at his 1955 funeral because she wanted her community to see what had happened to her son. She had said, "I wanted the world to see what they did to my baby." Photos of Till's open casket funeral were published in The Chicago Defender and Jet magazine; the murder was a seminal event in the civil rights movement. The artist has stated that she approached the painting from the perspective of a mother and partly based it on the verbal account of Till's mother about seeing her son after his death. Art.net critic Christian Viveros-Fauné described the work as "a powerful painterly reaction to the infamous [photograph] ... the canvas makes material the deep cuts and lacerations portrayed in the original photo by means of cardboard relief."

Some objected to the painting's inclusion in the 2017 Whitney Biennial, there were debates online, and protesters physically blocked the work from view. Artist and Whitney ISP graduate Hannah Black posted an open letter on Facebook, writing that "it is not acceptable for a white person to transmute Black suffering into profit and fun, though the practice has been normalized for a long time. Although Schutz's intention may be to present white shame, this shame is not correctly represented as a painting of a dead Black boy by a white artist ... The painting must go."

Schutz responded, "I don't know what it is like to be black in America, but I do know what it is like to be a mother. Emmett was Mamie Till's only son. The thought of anything happening to your child is beyond comprehension. [...] It is easy for artists to self-censor. To convince yourself to not make something before you even try. There were many reasons why I could not, should not, make this painting ... (but) art can be a space for empathy, a vehicle for connection."

Jo Livingstone and Lovia Gyarkye of the New Republic argued Open Casket is a form of cultural appropriation disrespectful toward Mobley's intention for the images of her son. Describing how the painting undermines the photograph they wrote, "Mobley wanted those photographs to bear witness to the racist brutality inflicted on her son; instead Schutz has disrespected that act of dignity, by defacing them with her own creative way of seeing." Scholar Christina Sharpe, one of 34 other signatories to Black's letter, argued for the destruction of the painting so that neither the artist nor future owners of the painting could profit off it. Schutz's work reportedly goes for up to $482,500 at auction, but the controversy made Schutz take the work out of circulation after the Biennial. Schutz says that "The painting was never for sale, and I didn't feel like it was appropriate for it to circulate in the marketplace." In addition, her former dealer, Zach Feuer told her she should take the piece out of the Biennial.

Artist, writer, and art professor at the University of Florida Coco Fusco responded by writing: "I find it alarming and entirely wrongheaded to call for the censorship and destruction of an artwork, no matter what its content is or who made it." She contextualized the painting within a history of anti-racist art made by white artists dating back to the 19th-century abolitionist movement. In weighing in on the discussion, Roberta Smith cited examples of "earlier works of art by those who crossed ethnic lines in their depiction of social trauma." Smith also positioned Open Casket in relation to other paintings Schutz has made of bodies that have endured suffering and violence. This includes Presentation (2005), a work based on dead American soldiers being returned home from war in Iraq and Afghanistan and their invisibility in the media due to a military ban on photographing them.

In January 2019, Ted Loos of The New York Times wrote that "the tremors from [the controversy around Open Casket] are still being felt." When asked whether she regretted making the work, she said that she did not wish she hadn't painted it but said: "I definitely feel conflicted about it and very bad about it," and the effect of the controversy has been for her to internalize the protesters' viewpoints in making new work.

Gary Garrels, senior curator at SFMoMA, said that "the debate was a 'wake-up call' for the art world. Reto Thüring who organized a solo exhibition of her work at the Cleveland Museum of Art and the Boston ICA said that he "welcomed" the negative feedback the institutions received for showing Open Casket and that it was "a learning experience" for them.

== Exhibitions ==
Schutz is represented by David Zwirner Gallery in New York and Contemporary Fine Arts in Berlin. Solo museum exhibitions include SITE Santa Fe in 2005, the Rose Art Museum in 2006 (a show which later traveled to the Museum of Contemporary Art, Cleveland), Douglas Hyde Gallery in Dublin, Ireland in 2010, the Museo d’Arte Moderna e Contemporanea di Trento e Rovereto in Rovereto, Italy in 2010, the Neuberger Museum in Purchase, New York (which traveled to the Miami Art Museum and the Museum of Contemporary Art, Denver the next year), the UK's Hepworth Wakefield in 2013, the Kestnergesellschaft in Hannover, Germany in 2014, at the Institute of Contemporary Art, Boston in 2017, and Eating Atom Bombs at the Transformer Station, Cleveland Museum of Art, Cleveland, Ohio in 2018.

She has participated in group exhibitions including the Venice Biennial (2003), Prague Biennial (2003), Greater New York (2005) at MoMA PS1, Take Two. Worlds and Views (2005) at The Museum of Modern Art, Two Years (2007) at the Whitney Museum, Eclipse: Art in a Dark Age (2008) at Moderna Museet in Stockholm, After Nature (2008) at the New Museum, Riotous Baroque (2012) at Kunsthaus Zürich, Comic Future (2013) at Ballroom Marfa in Marfa, Texas, and at the Musée Rath In Geneva Le retour des ténèbres (2016).

=== Additional selected solo exhibitions ===
- Dana Schutz: Still Life, Shaheen Modern & Contemporary Art, Cleveland, 2003
- Run, Mario Diacono Gallery, Boston, 2004
- Self Eaters and the People Who Love Them, Galerie Emmanuel Perrotin, Paris, 2004
- Dana Schutz, Nerman Museum of Contemporary Art, Overland Park, Kansas, 2004
- Götterdämmerung, The Metropolitan Opera, New York, NY, 2012
- Dana Schutz, Kestnergesellschaft, Hannover, Germany, 2014
- Dana Schutz, Musée d'art contemporain de Montréal, Montréal, Canada, 2015
- Dana Schutz: The Sea and All Its Subjects, David Zwirner, Paris, France, 2025

== Collections ==
Schutz's work is in museum and public collections including the Solomon R. Guggenheim Museum, Los Angeles County Museum of Art, The Metropolitan Museum of Art, The Museum of Modern Art, The Museum of Contemporary Art Los Angeles, Whitney Museum of American Art, San Francisco Museum of Modern Art, Institute of Contemporary Art, Boston and Tel Aviv Museum of Art.

== Art market ==
Schutz's painting Civil Planning (2004), from the collection of New Jersey–based management consultant David Teiger and benefitting the arts-focused Teiger Foundation, sold for $2 million at a Sotheby's auction in New York, setting a world record for the artist.

== Recognition ==
- Rema Hort Mann Foundation Grant, 2002
- Louis Comfort Tiffany Foundation Award, 2003
- American Academy of Arts and Letters Award, 2007
- Columbia University's Medal for Excellence, 2010

== Personal life ==
She is married to the artist Ryan Johnson, whom she met interviewing for entry into Columbia's MFA program. They have three children and own a studio building in Sunset Park, Brooklyn.

== Bibliography ==
- Hamza Walker, Dan Nadel, Lynne Tillman, Dana Schutz, Phaidon, London, 2023
- Malou Wedel Bruun, Anders Kold, Poul Erik Tøjner, Jarrett Earnest, Lauren Groff and Anaël Pigeat, Dana Schutz: Between Us, Louisiana Museum of Modern Art, Humlebæk, Denmark, 2023
- Cary Levine, Dana Schutz: If the Face Had Wheels, Prestel, Munich, 2011
- Jorg Heiser, Katy Siegel,, Raphaela Platow, Dana Schutz: Paintings 2002-2005, Rose Art Museum, Boston, 2006
