= Open Casket =

2016 painting by Dana Schutz

- Artist: Dana Schutz
- Year: 2016
- Medium: Oil on canvas
- Dimensions: 99 cm × 130 cm (39 in × 53 in)
- Location: New York

Open Casket is a 2016 painting by Dana Schutz. The subject is Emmett Till, a black 14-year-old boy who was lynched by two white men in Mississippi in 1955. It was one of the works included at the 2017 Whitney Biennial, curated by Christopher Y. Lew and Mia Locks. The painting caused controversy, with protests and calls for the painting's destruction. Protests inside the museum lasted up to two days.

== Background and concept ==
Dana Schutz made the painting in August 2016 in response to media coverage of gun violence, in particular, black men being shot by police. The portrait is based, in part, on a photograph of Till's mutilated body—his mother had insisted his casket remain open at his funeral to raise awareness of the graphic realities of racism in the U.S.—which was published in The Chicago Defender and Jet magazine. "The photograph of Emmett Till felt analogous to the time: what was hidden was now revealed", Schutz told Artnet.

The painting was first exhibited in Schutz's fall 2016 solo exhibition, "Waiting for the Barbarians", at Contemporary Fine Arts, Berlin. In February 2017, Open Casket was one of three of Schutz's paintings selected for inclusion in the 2017 Whitney Biennial. Describing the painting in a profile on Schutz for The New Yorker, critic Calvin Tomkins wrote, "Measuring thirty-nine by fifty-three inches, it is smaller than most of her recent paintings, and more abstract. The buildup of paint on the face is a couple of inches thick in the area where Till's mouth would be. Although there are no recognizable features, a deep trough carved into the heavy impasto conveys a sense of savage disfigurement, which is heightened by the whiteness of the boy's smoothly ironed dress shirt. His head rests on an ochre-yellow fabric, and deftly brushed colors at the top suggest banked flowers."

== Response ==
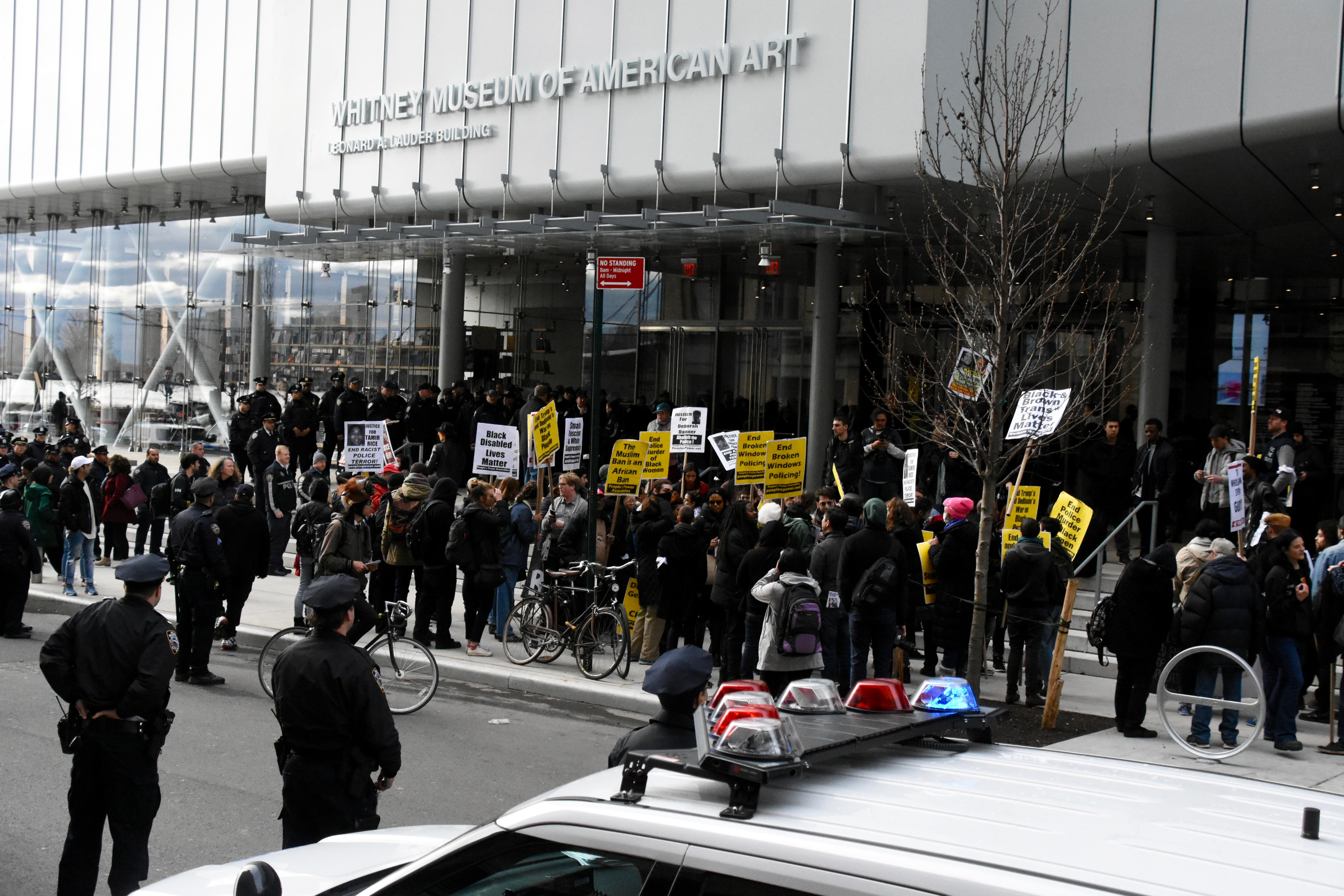
Protesters outside the Whitney Museum

Soon after the opening of the 2017 Whitney Biennial, African-American artist Parker Bright began to silently protest Open Casket by standing in front of the painting wearing a T-shirt with "Black Death Spectacle" on the back. Artist and writer Hannah Black posted an open letter to the museum's curators and staff to Facebook calling for the painting's removal and recommending its destruction:

I am writing to ask you to remove Dana Schutz's painting Open Casket with the urgent recommendation that the painting be destroyed and not entered into any market or museum. As you know, this painting depicts the dead body of 14-year-old Emmett Till in the open casket that his mother chose, saying, 'Let the people see what I've seen.' That even the disfigured corpse of a child was not sufficient to move the white gaze from its habitual cold calculation is evident daily and in a myriad of ways, not least the fact that this painting exists at all. In brief: The painting should not be acceptable to anyone who cares or pretends to care about Black people because it is not acceptable for a white person to transmute Black suffering into profit and fun ...

These actions led to a conversation in the media on cultural appropriation by white artists. Schutz responded through comments to reporters about how and why the painting was made:

I don't know what it is like to be black in America but I do know what it is like to be a mother. Emmett was Mamie Till's only son. The thought of anything happening to your child is beyond comprehension. Their pain is your pain. My engagement with this image was through empathy with his mother. ... Art can be a space for empathy, a vehicle for connection. I don't believe that people can ever really know what it is like to be someone else (I will never know the fear that black parents may have) but neither are we all completely unknowable.

On the relationship between her painting and the photograph of Till, Schutz reportedly said, "The photograph of him in his casket is almost impossible to look at. In making the painting, I relied more on listening to Mamie Till's verbal account of seeing her son, which oscillates between memory and observation." Schutz has also commented "The painting is very different from the photograph. I could never render the photograph ethically or emotionally."

Co-curator of the Whitney Biennial containing the painting, Mia Locks, said in defense of the painting's inclusion, "Right now I think there are a lot of sensitivities not just to race but to questions of identities in general. We welcome these responses. We invited these conversations intentionally in the way that we thought about the show." She added that the inclusion of the painting in the Whitney show was a way of "not letting Till's death be forgotten, as Mamie, his mother so wanted."

Hannah Black wrote, in an open letter about the painting, that "The subject matter is not Schutz's ... White free speech and white creative freedom have been founded on the constraint of others, and are not natural rights. The painting must go." She added that "contemporary art is a fundamentally white supremacist institution despite all our nice friends."

In an interview in Artnet Schutz is asked "Could you have foreseen that you were stepping on a third rail by treating this explosive subject? If so, what made it necessary to paint Emmett Till specifically?" Schutz responded "Yes, for many reasons. The anger surrounding this painting is real and I understand that. It's a problematic painting and I knew that getting into it. I do think that it is better to try to engage something extremely uncomfortable, maybe impossible, and fail, than to not respond at all."

Lisa Whittington, a black woman who has also painted pictures on Emmett Till told NBC News "Art takes courage. It takes courage to create it, to show it, and to listen to people talk about your work. While I appreciate Dana Shutz's courage, and attempt to understand—for me, her understanding is not deep enough and careless. The horror was too gentle in her work. She fell short and did not tell a complete story. She downplayed the details and the emotion his death represented."

Art historian George Baker wrote "We may want to believe that empathy has no restrictions but it does have limits. Schutz's painting, Open Casket, is naive, like most of the artist's work. Not just in its painterly style but in its gesture, its 'logic'. But naiveté edges into something much more sinister here, as the work collapses the destruction of Till's body and face, his murder, with the artist's own aesthetic. This is more narcissism than empathy. (Painting is not good at empathy; one of its founding myths, as Caravaggio long ago reminded us, of course is precisely the myth of Narcissus—the myth of boundless self-love, the myth as well of what Lacan would have called 'mis-recognition'.)"

An open letter purportedly from artist Dana Schutz declaring her desire to remove the painting from exhibition was subsequently proven to be a hoax, and The New Yorker reported that "the museum has been fully supportive of the curators and the artist, and the painting will remain on view throughout the exhibit" and that "the calls to destroy the art were clearly rhetorical, and the protest inside the museum petered out a day or two after the show opened."

In April 2017, the Whitney Museum partnered with Claudia Rankine and the Racial Imaginary Institute to host "Perspectives on Race and Representation", to address the debate sparked by the painting.

In November 2017, the painting and the surrounding issues were discussed on BBC Radio 4's Analysis.

== See also ==
- Censorship
- Emmett Till: How She Sent Him and How She Got Him Back, a 2012 painting by Lisa Whittington
- Civil rights movement in popular culture
