= Mamie Till =

Mother of Emmett Till (1921–2003)

Mamie Elizabeth Till-Mobley
- Till in 1955
- Born: Mamie Elizabeth Carthan; November 23, 1921; Webb, Mississippi, U.S.
- Died: January 6, 2003 (aged 81); Chicago, Illinois, U.S.
- Other name: Mamie Till-Bradley
- Education: Chicago Teacher's College; Loyola University Chicago
- Occupations: Educator; activist
- Years active: 1955–2003
- Known for: Mother of Chicago teenager Emmett Till who was murdered in Mississippi in 1955
- Spouses: Louis Till (m. 1940; executed 1945); Lemorse Mallory (m. 1946, divorced); Pink Bradley (m. 1951, divorced); Gene Mobley (m. 1957; died 2000)
- Children: Emmett Till
- Awards: Congressional Gold Medal

Mamie Elizabeth Till-Mobley (Note: Also often referred to in sources by use of an earlier husband's surname as Mamie Till-Bradley, she did not marry Gene Mobley until 1957, after she first came to prominence in 1955.) (born Mamie Elizabeth Carthan; November 23, 1921 – January 6, 2003) was an American educator and civil rights activist. Her 14-year-old son Emmett Till was the victim of a lynching in Mississippi on August 28, 1955. For Emmett's funeral in Chicago, Mamie Till insisted that the coffin containing his body be left open because, in her words, "I wanted the world to see what they did to my baby."

== Early life ==
Born Mamie Elizabeth Carthan on November 23, 1921, in Webb, Mississippi, she was the only child of Alma Smith Carthan and John Wiley Nash Carthan. During her early childhood, her family relocated from the South as part of the Great Migration, when many African Americans moved north due to frequent violence by white southerners, including lynchings and racial massacres. In 1922, shortly after Mamie was born, John Carthan moved to Argo, Illinois, near Chicago, where he found work at the Argo Corn Products Refining Company. Alma Carthan joined her husband in January 1924, bringing along two-year-old Mamie. They settled in a predominantly African-American neighborhood in Argo.

Mamie was 13 years old when her parents got divorced. Devastated, Mamie threw herself into her schoolwork and excelled in her studies. Alma had high hopes for her only daughter; Mamie later stated that although at that time "girls had one ambition—to get married", Alma encouraged her to concentrate on her schooling instead. Mamie was the first African-American student to make the "A" honor roll and only the fourth African-American student to graduate from the predominantly white Argo Community High School.

At age 18, Mamie met a young man from New Madrid, Missouri, named Louis Till. Employed by the Argo Corn Company, he was an amateur boxer who was popular with women, but Mamie's parents disapproved of the charismatic Till, thinking that he was "too sophisticated" for their daughter. At her mother's insistence, Mamie broke off their courtship. However, the persistent Till won out, and they married on October 14, 1940. Both were 18 years old. Their only child, Emmett Louis Till, was born nine months later, on July 25, 1941. The marriage was troubled: Louis was unfaithful and became abusive. On one occasion, he choked Mamie to unconsciousness; later that same night, Mamie threw a pot of scalding water at Louis. They separated in 1942, and Mamie eventually obtained a restraining order against her husband. After Louis repeatedly violated the order, a judge gave him the choice of serving jail time or joining the U.S. Army. Choosing the latter, Louis enlisted in 1943.

Mamie (right) with her son, Emmett Till (left)

In 1945, Mamie received notice from the War Department that, while serving in Italy, Louis had been executed due to "willful misconduct". Her attempts to learn more were comprehensively blocked by the Army bureaucracy. The full details of Louis Till's criminal charges and execution only emerged 10 years later. He, along with accomplice Fred A. McMurray, had been charged with raping and murdering an Italian woman. Both men were tried and convicted by a U.S. Army general court-martial, and their sentence was death by hanging. Their sentences were appealed, but the appeals were denied. They were buried in Plot E of the Oise-Aisne American Cemetery and Memorial in France. Later analysis of the trial by John Edgar Wideman would call Louis Till's guilt into question.

During the decade after World War II, Mamie had two brief marriages that both ended in divorce, first to Lemorse Mallory in 1946 and then to Pink Bradley in 1951. By the early 1950s, Mamie and Emmett had moved to an apartment on Chicago's South Side in Woodlawn. She worked as a clerk first for the Social Security Administration, then for the Air Force where she was in charge of confidential files. Mamie worked long hours, and Emmett took over many household chores, including cooking dinner each evening.

== Murder of Emmett Till ==
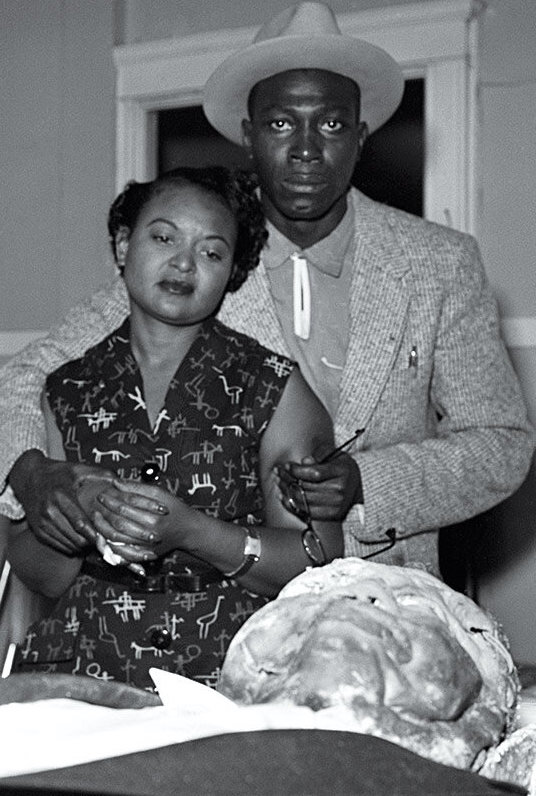
Mamie Till with her fiancé, Gene Mobley, looking over the body of her son Emmett

In August 1955, when Emmett was 14, Mamie put him on the train to spend the summer visiting his cousins at the home of his great-uncle Moses Wright in Money, Mississippi. Before Emmett left, Mamie warned him that Chicago and Mississippi were completely different, that he would have to act differently, and he should know how to behave in front of white people in the South. Mamie never saw Emmett alive again, as he was abducted and brutally murdered on August 28, 1955, after being accused of interacting inappropriately with a white woman.

Three days after arriving in Money, on August 24, Emmett and his cousins went to Bryant's Grocery and Meat Market to buy refreshments after working on a farm field in the strong sun. The market mostly served the sharecroppers. Carolyn Bryant, the wife of store owner Roy Bryant, was alone in the store that day because her sister was watching the children. The precise facts of what happened at the store are disputed; however, Till was accused of touching, flirting with, or whistling at Carolyn.

At 2:30 a.m. on Sunday, August 28, Roy Bryant and his half-brother John William "J. W." Milam, kidnapped Till from Moses Wright's home. Till was abducted while he was sharing a bed with a cousin and there were a total of eight people in the cabin. Till's great-aunt, Elizabeth, offered the men money, but Milam refused. They threatened death to those in the cabin if they did not let them take Emmett. Wright said he heard them ask someone in the car if this was the boy, and heard someone say "yes."

Till admitted to the men to being the one who had talked to Carolyn. They brutally pistol-whipped him, beat him, made him strip, and shot him in the head before disposing of his dead body by dumping it in a river. Till was tossed over the Black Bayou Bridge in Glendora, near the Tallahatchie River. His face was unrecognizable because of the trauma. The only identifying feature that was a factor in identifying Till was a ring that had belonged to his father that he was wearing. It was a silver ring with the initials "LT" and "May 25, 1943" carved in it.

The following month, on September 23, Milam and Bryant faced trial for Till's kidnapping and murder, but were acquitted by the all-white jury after a five-day trial and a 67-minute deliberation. Four months later in an interview with Look magazine on January 24, 1956, the foreman said, "If we hadn't stopped to drink pop, it wouldn't have taken that long." Protected against double jeopardy, Milam and Bryant admitted to killing Emmett Till and were not tried twice. Both men were paid and made a profit between $3,600 and $4,000.

=== Open-casket funeral ===
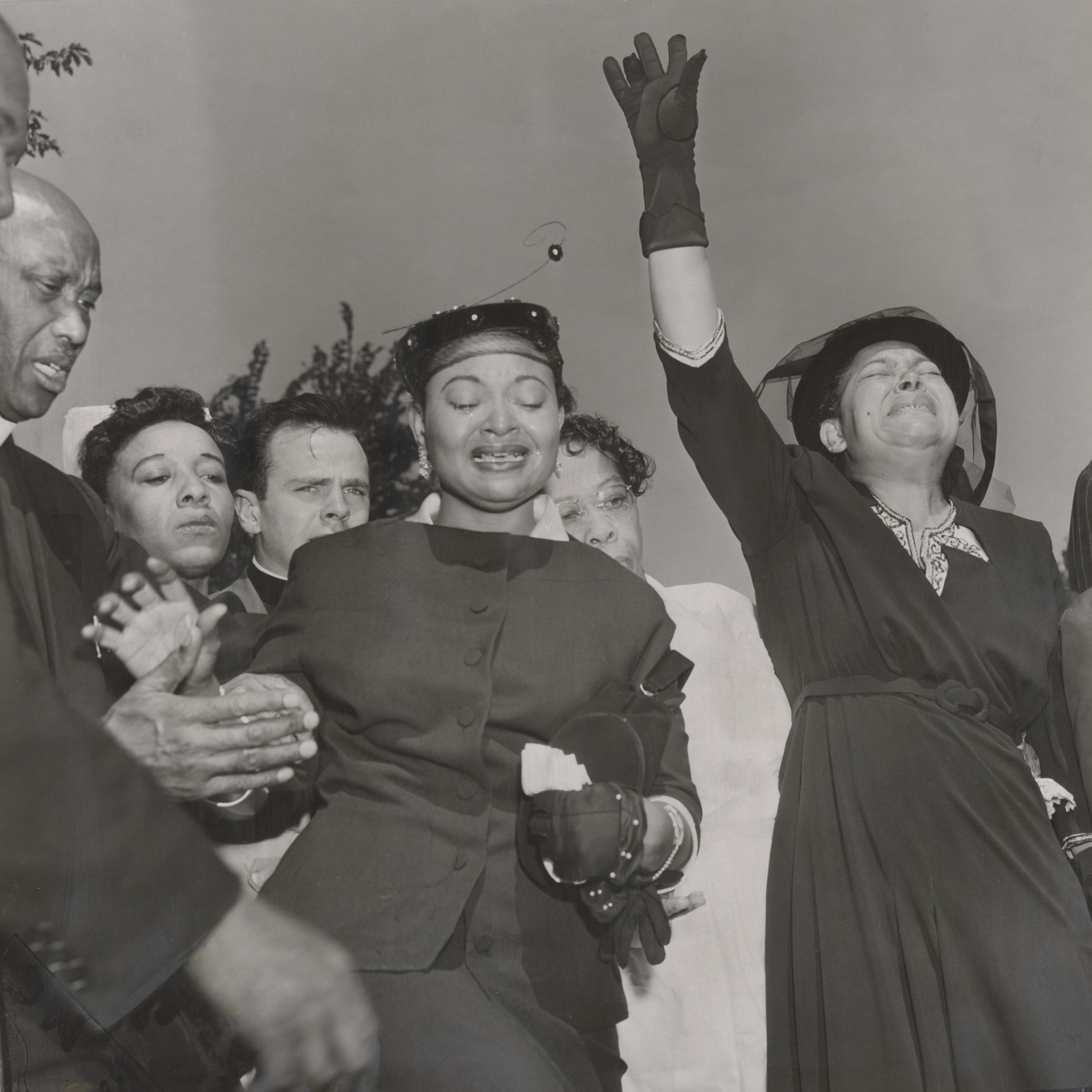
Till-Mobley (center) among mourners at her son's funeral

For her son's funeral, Mamie Till insisted that the casket containing his body be left open, because, in her words: "I wanted the world to see what they did to my baby." Tens of thousands of people viewed Emmett's body, and photographs circulated around the country. Jet magazine and the Chicago Defender (both Black publications) published pictures of Till's disfigured body.

Mamie opted to have an open-casket funeral for five days at the Roberts Temple Church of God in Christ. As a result of the enormous attention it received, the Till case became emblematic of the disparity of justice for Blacks in the American South.

== Activism ==
After her son's murder, it became quickly evident that Till-Mobley was an effective public speaker. She enjoyed a close relationship with many African-American media outlets, and the NAACP hired Till-Mobley to go on a speaking tour around the country and share her son's story. This was one of the most successful fundraising tours in NAACP history, though it was cut short by a business dispute with NAACP executive secretary Roy Wilkins over payment for Till-Mobley's work on the tour. She continued speaking out, and to influence the jury during the trial of her son's murderers, Till-Mobley flew to Mississippi and provided testimony.

Till-Mobley's activism extended far beyond what she did in the wake of her son's murder. However, since his death became symbolic of the lynchings of the mid-1950s, Till-Mobley remains most well-known in that context. For this, and all her activism, Till-Mobley was able to use her role as a mother to relate to other people and to gain support for the cause of racial justice.

A large part of Till-Mobley's work and activism centered on education, as she advocated for children living in poverty for over 40 years, including 23 years teaching in the Chicago public school system. Till-Mobley established a theater group called "The Emmett Till Players". This group worked with school children outside the classroom in a theatrical setting, where they would learn and perform famous speeches by civil rights leaders such as Martin Luther King Jr. to inspire hope, unity, and determination to their audiences.

== Later life and education ==
After her son's murder, Till-Mobley returned to school to become a teacher. In 1960, she graduated from Chicago Teachers College (now Chicago State University). Till-Mobley taught on the South Side of Chicago, while also continuing her work as an activist and her efforts to honor the life of her son. In 1971, Till-Mobley earned a master's degree in educational administration from Loyola University Chicago.

In 1992, Till-Mobley had the opportunity to listen while Roy Bryant was interviewed about his involvement in her son's murder. With Bryant unaware that Till-Mobley was listening, he asserted that Emmett Till had ruined his life. Bryant expressed no remorse and stated, "Emmett Till is dead. I don't know why he can't just stay dead."

== Personal life and death ==
Till's grave at Burr Oak Cemetery

On June 24, 1957, Mamie Till-Bradley married Gene Mobley and later changed her surname to Till-Mobley. They were married until Gene died from a stroke on March 18, 2000.

On January 6, 2003, Till-Mobley died of heart failure at age 81. She was buried next to her husband and near her son at Burr Oak Cemetery in Alsip, Illinois, where her monument reads, "Her pain united a nation."

Till-Mobley coauthored with Christopher Benson her memoir, Death of Innocence: The Story of the Hate Crime that Changed America, published by Random House in 2003, almost 50 years after her son's death. Till-Mobley died a few months before the book was published. She closes her autobiography by writing, "Although I have lived so much of my life without Emmett, I have lived my entire life because of him."

== Legacy ==
In 1973, Till-Mobley created the Emmett Till Players, a student group that traveled to deliver works about "hope, determination, and unity" by reciting speeches of Dr. King and other civil rights leaders. She also founded and chaired the Emmett Till Justice Campaign. The campaign group eventually succeeded in getting enacted into law the Emmett Till Unsolved Civil Rights Crime Act of 2008 and the Emmett Till Unsolved Civil Rights Crimes Reauthorization Act of 2016.

In 2015, Whoopi Goldberg announced plans for a film called Till, based on the life of Till-Mobley. The film uses as sources, among others, the 2004 documentary The Untold Story of Emmett Louis Till by Keith Beauchamp and the book Simeon's Story: An Eyewitness Account of the Kidnapping of Emmett Till, written by Till's cousin Simeon Wright. Danielle Deadwyler plays Till-Mobley, with newcomer Jalyn Hall as Emmett and Goldberg as Mamie Till's mother, Alma Carthan. The film, directed by Chinonye Chukwu, was theatrically released on October 14, 2022. Most of the movie is about Till-Mobley and her activism after Emmett's murder. Till-Mobley is portrayed by Adrienne Warren in the six-part 2022 television drama Women of the Movement.

In 2022, Congress awarded Till-Mobley and Emmett Till a posthumous Congressional Gold Medal, to be put on display at the National Museum of African American History. The following year, a statue of Till-Mobley in a plaza dedicated to her was unveiled in front of the Argo Community High School, where Till-Mobley had graduated as an honor student, in Summit, Illinois.

On March 29, 2022, President Joe Biden signed the Emmett Till Antilynching Act. The bill made lynching punishable by up to 30 years in prison. U.S. Vice President Kamala Harris sponsored the law with Senator Cory Booker, Democrat of New Jersey, when she was still in the Senate. On July 25, 2023, what would have been Emmett Till's 82nd birthday, Biden signed a proclamation designating the Emmett Till and Mamie Till-Mobley National Monument.
