= African-American Heritage Sites =

Historic places in the USA

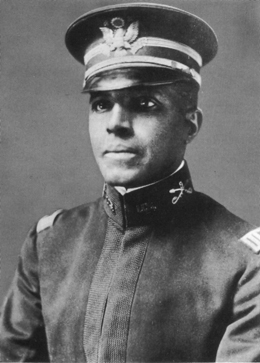
Capt. Charles Young

The National Park System preserves the history and contributions of African Americans as part of the nation's history. Over the years, the staff of the National Park Service has reflected the nation's social history. Among the first African Americans who influenced the course of the National Parks were:

- Early Superintendents (not fully inclusive)
  - Charles Young: He served as an early Superintendent of Sequoia National Park in 1903. As a Captain in the 9th Cavalry Regiment, he was directed to take two troops of Buffalo soldiers to the Giants Grove of Sequoia and protect the trees and the park from damage. While there, the two companies completed construction of a road to the Giant's Grove, making public access possible.
  - Robert Stanton, National Capital Parks (East) (1970–1971)
  - Georgia Ellard, Rock Creek Park (1977–1988)
  - Garry Traynham, Allegheny Portage (1990–1995)
- Deputy Directors
  - Donald Murphy, (2002–2005)
- Director
  - Robert Stanton, (1997–2001)

== Parks ==
The National Park Service has preserved many sites that are directly related to African American History, Heritage, or Culture.

Name	City	State
African Burial Ground National Monument	New York	New York
Arlington House, The Robert E. Lee Memorial	Arlington County	Virginia
Booker T. Washington National Monument	Hardy	Virginia
Boston African American National Historic Site	Boston	Massachusetts
Brown v. Board of Education National Historic Site	Topeka	Kansas
Cane River Creole National Historical Park	Natchez	Louisiana
Colonial National Historical Park (Jamestown African Americans)	Yorktown	Virginia
Dayton Aviation Heritage National Historical Park (Paul L. Dunbar House)	Dayton	Ohio
Emmett Till and Mamie Till-Mobley National Monument (Roberts Temple Church of God in Christ)	Chicago	Illinois
Emmett Till and Mamie Till-Mobley National Monument (Graball Landing on the Tallahatchie River and Tallahatchie County Second District Courthouse)	Tallahatchie County	Mississippi
Frederick Douglass National Historic Site	Washington	D.C.
Fort Davis National Historic Site (Buffalo Soldiers)	Fort Davis	Texas
Fort Scott National Historic Site (Kansas 1st Colored Dragoons)	Fort Scott	Kansas
Fort Smith National Historic Site (from slavery to Parker's Court)	Fort Smith	Arkansas
Gateway Arch National Park (Black Frontiersman)	St. Louis	Missouri
George Washington Birthplace National Monument (Washington's Slaves, Indentured Servants, & Free Blacks)	Washington's Birthplace	Virginia
George Washington Carver National Monument	Diamond	Missouri
Guadalupe Mountains National Park (Buffalo Soldiers)	Salt Flat	Texas
Harpers Ferry National Historical Park	Harpers Ferry	West Virginia
Hopewell Furnace National Historic Site	Berks County	Pennsylvania
Jean Lafitte National Historical Park and Preserve	New Orleans	Louisiana
Lincoln Memorial	Washington	D.C.
Little Rock Central High School	Little Rock	Arkansas
Maggie L. Walker National Historic Site	Richmond	Virginia
Martin Luther King, Jr. National Historic Site	Atlanta	Georgia
Martin Luther King Jr. Memorial	Washington	D.C.
Mary McLeod Bethune Council House National Historic Site	Washington	D.C.
New Orleans Jazz National Historical Park	New Orleans	Louisiana
Nicodemus National Historic Site,	Nicodemus	Kansas
Perry's Victory and International Peace Memorial (Black Sailors)	Put-in-Bay	Ohio
Petersburg National Battlefield	Petersburg	Virginia
Port Chicago Naval Magazine National Memorial,	Concord	California
Richmond National Battlefield Park	Richmond	Virginia
San Francisco Maritime National Historical Park (African American Maritime History)	San Francisco	California
Selma to Montgomery National Historic Trail	Montgomery, Lowndes, & Dallas Counties	Alabama
Timucuan Ecological and Historic Preserve (Kingsley Plantation)	Jacksonville	Florida
Tuskegee Airman National Historic Site	Tuskegee	Alabama
Tuskegee Institute National Historic Site	Tuskegee	Alabama
Virgin Islands National Park	St. John	Virgin Islands

== See also ==
- Canada
  - African-Canadian Heritage Tour
  - List of black Canadians
  - North American Black Historical Museum
  - Slavery in Canada
- United States
  - African American Historic Places
  - African Americans in France
- General
  - African diaspora
  - Black people
  - List of topics related to Black and African people

== Bibliography ==
- Savage, Beth L. (Ed.) African American Historic Places, National Register of Historic Places National Park Service, Preservation Press, 1994
