= Unmarked grave =

Place of burial

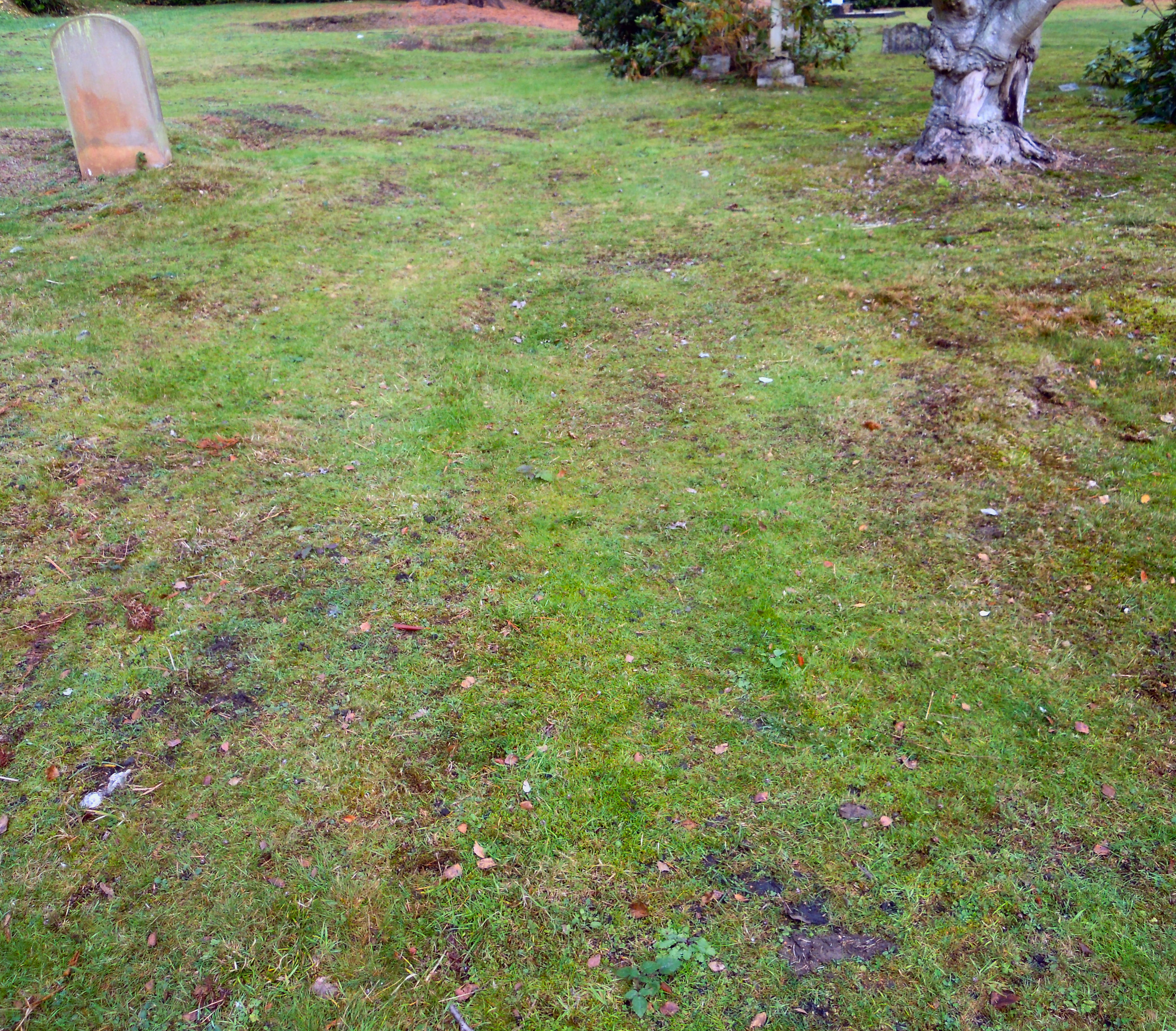
The unmarked grave of the actor Llewellyn Cadwaladr in Brookwood Cemetery in the UK.

An unmarked grave is one that lacks a marker, headstone, or nameplate indicating that a body is buried there. It may also include burials that previously had identification but which are no longer identifiable due to weather damage, neglect, disturbance or otherwise. However, in cultures that mark burial sites, the phrase unmarked grave has taken on a metaphorical meaning.

The term has been used to describe former Canadian Indian Residential School cemeteries. "Given the lack of regulations" in the schools' early years, it appears that most Residential School cemeteries "were established informally", resulting in little formal documentation as to their whereabouts. Over time, many cemeteries had been abandoned, disused, and were vulnerable to accidental disturbance and weather damage. As such, the locations of many burial sites, wood grave markers and names of the deceased have been lost.

== Metaphorical meanings ==
As a figure of speech, a common meaning of the term "unmarked grave" is consignment to an ignominious end. A grave monument (or headstone) is a sign of respect or fondness, erected with the intention of commemorating and remembering a person.

=== Criminals ===
Conversely, a deliberately unmarked grave may signify disdain and contempt. The underlying intention of some unmarked graves may be to suggest that the person buried is not worthy of commemoration or respect, and should be completely ignored and forgotten, e.g., mass murderers such as Boston Marathon Bomber Tamerlan Tsarnaev.

Unmarked graves have long been used to bury executed criminals as an added degree of disgrace. Similarly, many 18th and 19th century prisons and mental asylums historically used numbered (but otherwise featureless) markers in their inmate cemeteries, which allowed for record-keeping and visitations while also minimizing the shame associated with having one's family name on permanent display in such a disreputable context. Plot E at Oise-Aisne American Cemetery (consisting entirely of soldiers executed for rape and/or murder) is a rare example of this policy persisting into the 20th century.

More recently, the practice has been to cremate and secretly scatter the ashes of notorious criminals in some anonymous place. Cremation and secret scattering of the ashes also has the additional effect of removing all possibility of there being a grave to visit in the future. This was the fate of Nazi war criminals such as Adolf Eichmann, Hermann Göring, Heinrich Himmler, Fritz Sauckel, and Julius Streicher. The remains of British serial killers Myra Hindley, Dr Harold Shipman, and Fred West were treated in the same way. A similar proceeding was carried out with the remains of Martin Bormann, who committed suicide shortly after the fall of Berlin in 1945, and whose remains, found in 1972 and positively identified by 1998, were disposed of in the Baltic Sea in 1999. In 2021, the ashes of Abimael Guzmán, the leader of the Peruvian Maoist insurgent organization Shining Path, who died in prison, were secretly disposed of by Peruvian authorities.

After he was killed in 2011 as part of Operation Neptune Spear, the body of Osama bin Laden was placed in a weighted plastic bag and made to sink into the sea at an undisclosed location. A year after his death, the headstone of disgraced television presenter and alleged sex offender Jimmy Savile was removed and destroyed in 2012, three weeks after being erected, when posthumous allegations of sexual abuse over decades came to light. In 2022, during the Salvadoran gang crackdown, graves of Mara Salvatrucha members in El Salvador were ordered to be destroyed, and prisoners were sent to smash up tombstones and remove gang-related graffiti.

=== Judaism ===
In Judaism, contact with a corpse confers uncleanness (see Numbers 19:11-22 and Tractate Oholoth in the Mishna). Cohanim, descendants of Aaron, are prohibited from approaching within 4 cubits of a grave, except for when a funeral is of a close relative. Thus, an unmarked grave opens up the possibility that a pious Jew could become defiled without being aware that it happened. The Jews of early times, therefore, sought to avoid unmarked graves by two means: clearly designating cemeteries beyond the limits of their villages and cities, and making graves and tombs obvious by whitewashing them. This is the background for Jesus's comparison of the Pharisees of his time to white-washed tombs (see Matthew 23:27-28) and to "unmarked graves, which men walk over without knowing it" (Luke 11:44). Jesus warned that the Pharisees were defiling others by their hypocrisy, misplaced priorities, and selfish ambition.

== Other reasons for unmarked graves ==
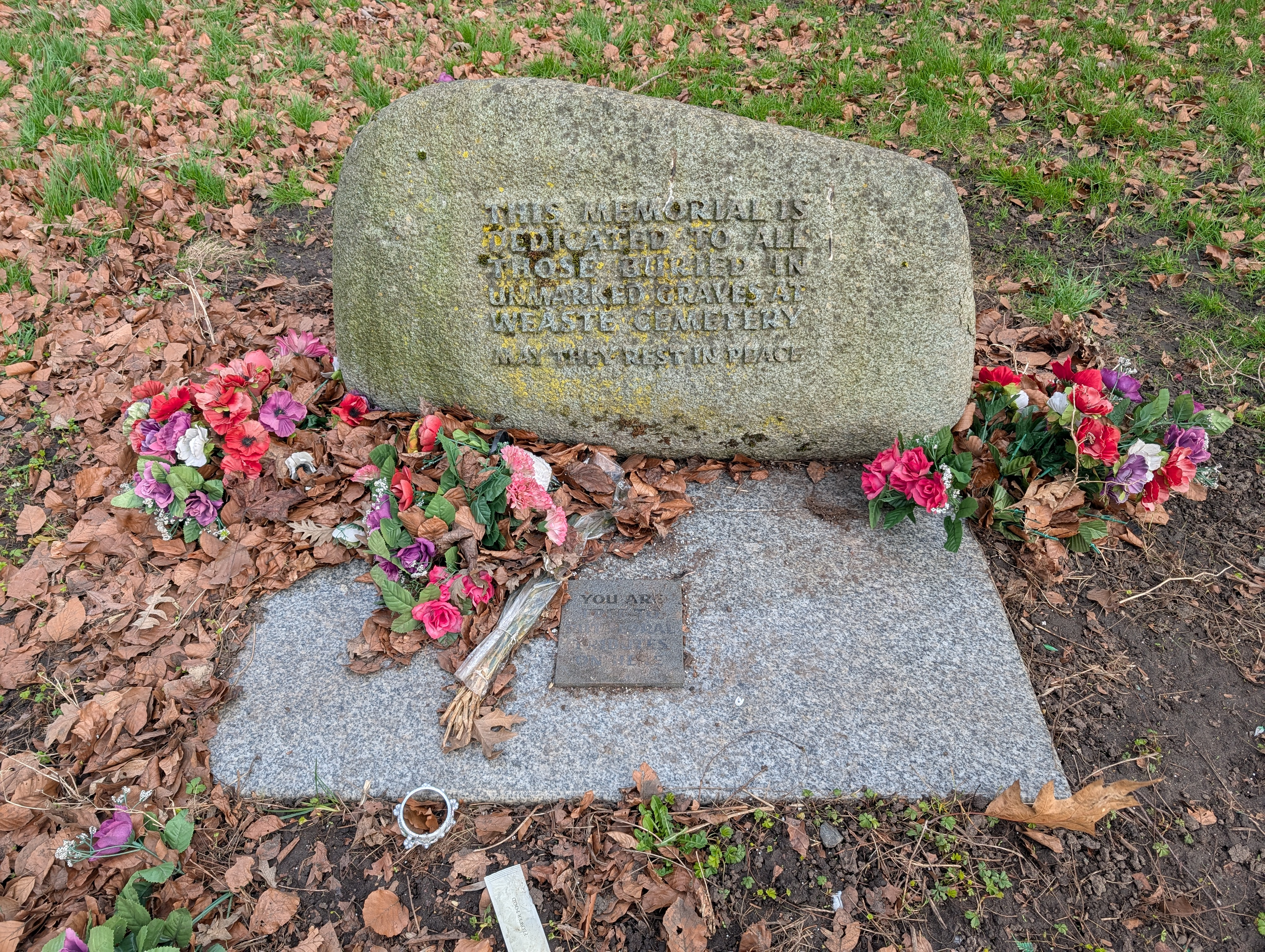
Memorial stone for those who lie in the unmarked graves nearby

However, disdain and contempt are not the only reasons why graves remain unmarked.

According to legend, Genghis Khan asked to be buried without markings or any sign, and after he died, his body was returned to Mongolia.

As Alicia Hoyt reports: "Historically, financial limitations and social status were factors in whether a person (even a famous one) was awarded a big fancy marker. Mass, unmarked graves were also common in times of widespread disease or war; plus older markers simply deteriorated over time or were stolen. Another reason might be: other gravesites reflect the wishes of the deceased or family members who simply don't want a marker, can't decide on wording, or plan to add one down the line when a loved one passes away and joins them in the plot."

Additionally, "modern celebrity concerns" may be related to a desire for privacy or to avoid vandalism. For example, basketball player Kobe Bryant and his daughter Gianna, singer Michael Jackson, businessman and Apple's Founder Steve Jobs, actor George C. Scott, musician Frank Zappa, singer Roy Orbison, comedian John Belushi, and writer H. P. Lovecraft (discussed below) are notable people whose burial sites have been left unmarked (or marked deceptively) for reasons that are not financial.

In the case of comedian John Belushi, the gravestone at his grave in a Martha's Vineyard cemetery was removed and relocated, after operators of the cemetery found many signs of vandalism and rowdiness, where his body lies. In response, a cenotaph gravestone was erected at a nearby empty grave, to deter disrespectful visitors, leaving his actual final resting place without a marker. Another Belushi cenotaph gravestone was erected by his family in a Chicago area cemetery, at the Belushi family plot, where his parents are now buried. Similarly, when H. P. Lovecraft's headstone in Providence, Rhode Island was stolen, a replacement marker was erected in a different location.

In cases when a person's remains are lost, a cenotaph may be erected.

Deceased monarchs and princes of Saudi Arabia are buried in unmarked graves in the public Al Oud cemetery in Riyadh. There is also typically no state funeral or national show of mourning. The Wahhabi sect of Sunni Islam practiced in Saudi Arabia considers public shows of grief or memorials to the dead to be un-Islamic, and therefore the royal family typically practices austere, private burials.

== Canadian Indian Residential School Cemeteries ==
The Canadian Indian residential school system (Note: Indian is used here because of the historical nature of the article and the precision of the name, as with Indian hospital. It was, and continues to be, used by government officials, Indigenous peoples and historians while referencing the school system. The use of the name also provides relevant context about the era in which the system was established, specifically one in which Indigenous peoples in Canada were homogeneously referred to as Indians rather than by language that distinguishes First Nations, Inuit and Métis peoples. Use of Indian is limited throughout the article to proper nouns and references to government legislation.) was a network of boarding schools for Indigenous children directed and funded by the Department of Indian Affairs. Administered by various Christian churches and funded by the federal Canadian government from 1828 to 1997 Canadian Indian residential school system attempted to assimilate Indigenous children into Euro-Canadian culture and society. Over 4,000 students died while attending Canadian residential school, most from Tuberculosis, with the 1870s to the 1920s being the deadliest period. The deceased were often buried in school cemeteries. "Given the lack of regulations at the time", it appears that most cemeteries "were established informally", resulting in few formal documents. The age and duration of the schools suggests that most had a cemetery associated with them. Over time, many cemeteries had been abandoned, disused, and were vulnerable to accidental disturbance and weather damage. As such, the locations of many burial sites, wood grave markers and names of the deceased have been lost.

In a May 27 press release from Tk’emlúps te Secwépemc, the Indigenous group announced "that a radar survey near the former Kamloops Indian Residential School had found 'confirmation of the remains of 215 children'" (later referred to as 200 "probable burials" or "targets of interest" by Dr. Sarah Beaulieu who performed the search). The New York Times piece that broke the story the following day, as well as subsequent reporting in Canada and internationally that year, reported the discovery of "mass graves" of Indigenous children at former Canadian Indian Residential School sites. Terry Glavin of the National Post wrote that contrary to these reports, there was no mass murder of thousands of Indigenous children at Canadian Indian Residential Schools, a baseless QAnon-esque theory originating in the 1990s which Glavin noted the 2021 "mass graves" claims appear to lend credence to. Rather, work is being done on known and old suspected cemeteries to try to identify burials.

As of March 2025, no bodies have been exhumed from the suspected cemeteries. In many communities, there is a lack consensus on whether to investigate detected anomalies at the risk of disturbing burials. Disputes regarding the conclusiveness of the evidence has helped spawn a fringe movement of denialism about some residential school burial sites. Academics Sean Carleton and Reid Gerbrandt have dismissed claims of a "mass grave hoax", saying that claimed discoveries of mass graves was uncommon in most popular media and that there had been public misinterpretation of what had actually been announced in 2021. Federal Justice Minister David Lametti said in 2023 that he was open to outlawing residential school denialism. His successor, Arif Virani, has not taken a position on the issue, stating his office is considering all options.

== See also ==
- Burial
- Canadian Indian residential school gravesites
- Mass grave
- Cemetery
- Potter's field
