= Open secret =

Generally known but officially unacknowledged information

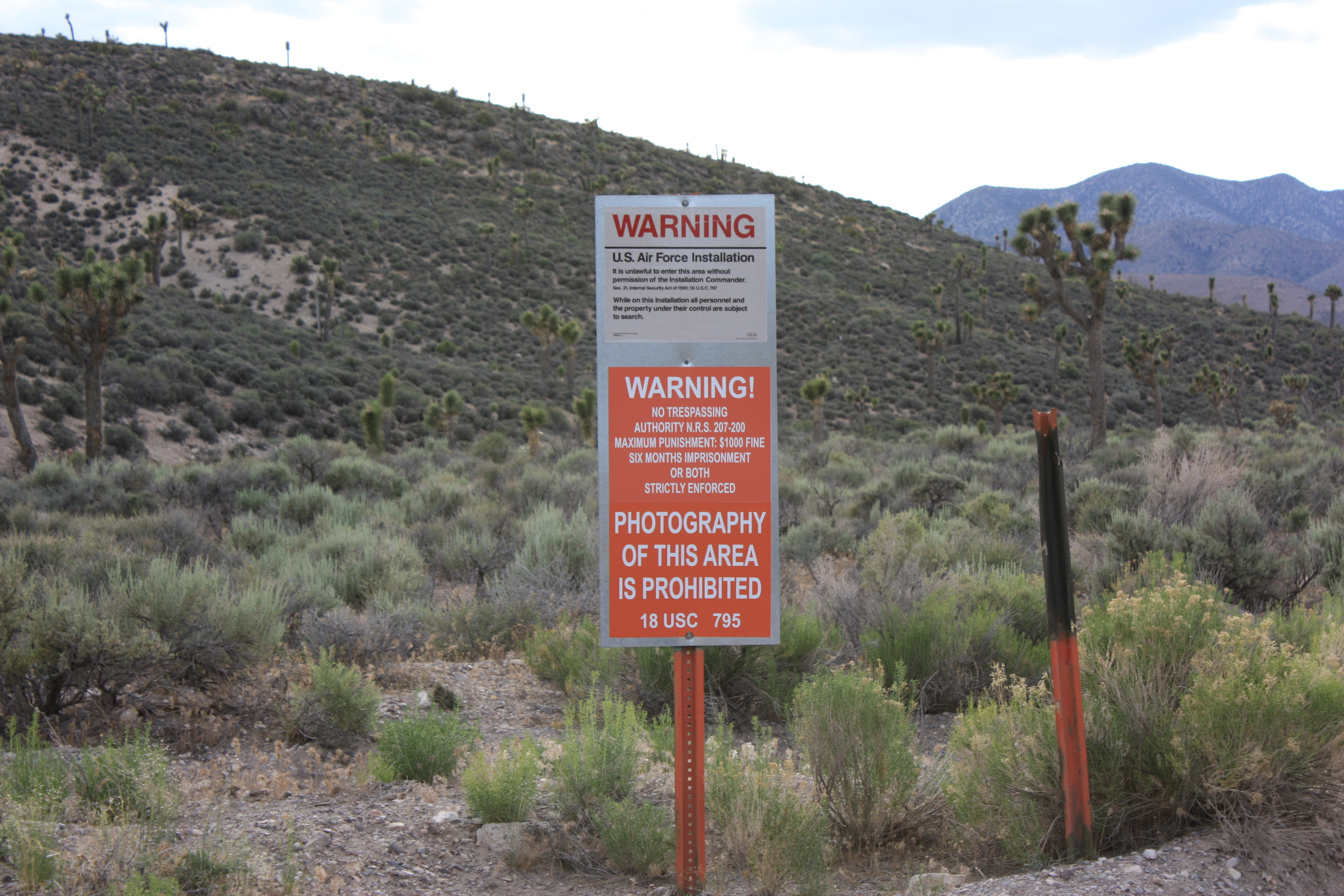
Area 51 Groom Road gate

An open secret is information that was originally intended to be confidential but has at some point been disclosed and is known to many people. Open secrets are secrets in the sense that they are excluded from formal or official discourse, but they are open in the sense that they are familiar and referred to in idioms and language games, though these often require explanation for outsiders.

== United States government ==
=== Area 51 ===
One well-known open secret is that of Area 51, a United States military base containing an aircraft testing facility. The U.S. government did not explicitly affirm the existence of any military facility near Groom Lake, Lincoln County, Nevada, until 2013, when the CIA released documents revealing that the site was established to test spy planes. While the general location of the base is now officially acknowledged, the base does not appear on government maps or in declassified satellite photography. Yet despite this, the base was demonstrably and widely acknowledged to exist for many years before the CIA officially confirmed its existence. The immense secrecy has made it the frequent subject of conspiracy theories and a central component to UFO folklore.

=== NSA ===
The National Security Agency was formally established by President Truman in a memorandum of 24 October 1952, that revised National Security Council Intelligence Directive (NSCID) 9. Since President Truman's memo was a classified document, the existence of the NSA was not known to the public at that time. Due to its ultra-secrecy, the U.S. intelligence community referred to the NSA as "No Such Agency". The existence of the NSA would later be officially revealed to the public in 1975 in the Church Committee investigation.

=== Plot E at Oise-Aisne American Cemetery ===
Officially, Plot E does not exist. The official ABMC guide pamphlet and website does not make any reference to Plot E. Regardless, it is the fifth plot at the Oise-Aisne American Cemetery and Memorial, an American military cemetery in northern France. Plot E contains the remains of 94 American military prisoners, all of whom were executed by hanging or firing squad under military authority for crimes committed during or shortly after World War II. Plot E is approximately 100 metres (110 yards) away from the main cemetery and is a separate, hidden section. Access is difficult and visitors are not encouraged, though the section is maintained by cemetery caretakers who periodically mow the lawn area and trim the hedges.

== United Kingdom government ==
=== MI6 ===
The existence of the British Secret Intelligence Service (MI6) was widely known for several decades before the government's official acknowledgement of the organisation in 1994.

=== Post Office Tower ===
Post Office Tower was completed in 1964 and information about it was designated an official secret, due to its importance to the national communications network. In 1978, the journalist Duncan Campbell was tried for collecting information about secret locations, and during the trial the judge ordered that the sites could not be identified by name; the Post Office Tower could only be referred to as "Location 23". It was officially revealed by Kate Hoey under parliamentary privilege in 1993.

It is often said that the tower did not appear on Ordnance Survey maps, despite being a 177-metre (581 ft) tall structure in the middle of central London that was open to the public for about 15 years. However, this is incorrect; the 1:25,000 (published 1971) and 1:10,000 (published 1981) Ordnance Survey maps show the tower. It is also shown in the London A–Z street atlas from 1984.

== Other governments ==
=== Israel nuclear weapons ===
Israel is widely acknowledged to possess nuclear weapons. This can be considered an open secret, because the Israeli government has never explicitly stated whether or not it possesses a nuclear stockpile, officially maintaining a policy of deliberate ambiguity.

=== Camp Mirage ===
Camp Mirage is the codename for a former Canadian Forces forward logistics facility located in Dubai, United Arab Emirates. The facility was established in late December 2001 and, though not officially acknowledged by the Canadian Forces, was considered an open secret.

== Entertainment ==
=== Kayfabe ===
Kayfabe, or the presentation of professional wrestling as "real" or unscripted, is an open secret, kept displayed as legitimate within the confines of wrestling programs but openly acknowledged as predetermined by wrestlers and promoters in the context of interviews for decades.

=== The Stig's identity ===
In television, the primary real-world identity of The Stig, a costumed and masked television test-driver used by BBC Television for Top Gear, was an open secret until the unofficial embargo was broken by a newspaper in 2009.

== See also ==
- He never married – Euphemism for homosexuality of the deceased
- Pronoun game – Concealing one's sexual orientation from others by using gender neutral pronouns
- Secret de Polichinelle – another term for open secret
- Alena V. Ledeneva – researcher of open secrets, particularly in the Soviet context
