= Rongbatsa Agreement =

Peace agreement between Tibet and RoC in 1910s

The 1918 Chamdo and Rongbatsa Agreements
- Signed: August 19, 1918
- Parties: United Kingdom; Tibet; Republic of China

The Rongbatsa Agreement of 1918 was signed following the victory of Tibetan Army, the military force of the de facto independent Tibet at the time under Kashag, against the Beiyang government of Republic of China. The treaty demarcated the border between China and Tibet, along the Yangtze River, with two enclaves for Tibet on the left bank of the river. China later denounced the treaty.

Following China's refusal to recognize the agreement reached in Simla Convention in 1914, conflict resumed in the autumn of 1917 after China arrested and killed two Tibetan soldiers in Chamdo. Facing military defeat, China requested British diplomat Eric Teichman to help broker the ceasefire agreement and the three parties signed an initial agreement in May 1918, before ultimately signing this final agreement in August 1918 which also defined the border between China and Tibet, and was supplemented by another agreement in October 1918.

However, the treaty was later denounced by China.
