= Louis Till =

American soldier, father of Emmett Till (1923–1945)

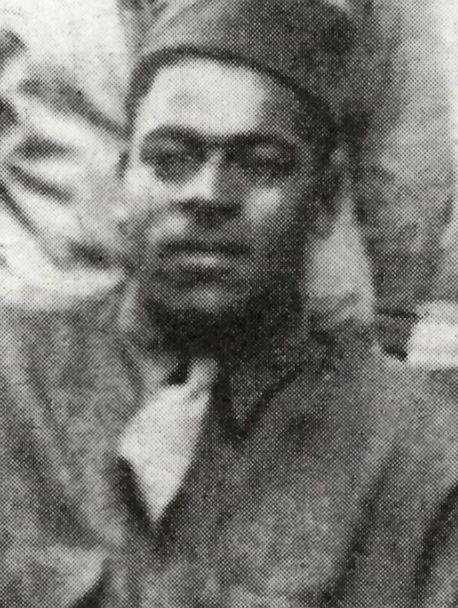
- Till c.1943
- Born: February 7, 1922; Cape Girardeau, Missouri, U.S.
- Died: July 2, 1945 (aged 23); Aversa, Province of Caserta, Kingdom of Italy
- Cause of death: Execution by hanging
- Resting place: Oise-Aisne American Cemetery Plot E, France
- Education: Argo Community High School
- Spouse: Mamie Carthan (m. 1940)
- Children: Emmett Till
- Convictions: Premeditated murder Rape (2 counts)
- Penalty: Death

Louis Till (February 7, 1922 – July 2, 1945) was an American soldier who served in World War II. After enlisting in the United States Army following trial for domestic violence against his estranged wife Mamie Till, and having chosen military service over jail time, Till was court-martialed on two counts of rape and one count of murder during the Italian Campaign. He was found guilty and was executed by hanging at Aversa. Till was the estranged father of Emmett Till, whose murder in August 1955 at the age of 14 galvanized the civil rights movement. The circumstances of Till's death remained largely unknown, until they were revealed after the highly controversial acquittal of his son's killers 10 years later.

There is debate on the matter of Louis Till's guilt concerning the crime for which he was executed. In 2016, novelist John Edgar Wideman argued that Till was innocent and that racial bias was a factor in his conviction, comparing it to the trial of his son's murderers.

== Early life ==
Till grew up an orphan in New Madrid, Missouri. As a young man, he worked at the Argo Corn Company and was an amateur boxer.

Till began courting Mamie Carthan, a girl who was a few months older than him. Her parents disapproved, thinking the charismatic Till was "too sophisticated" for their daughter. At her mother's insistence, Mamie broke off their courtship, but the persistent Till won out and they got married on October 14, 1939. Both were then aged 18 years old. Their only child, Emmett Louis Till, was born nine months later, on July 25, 1941. However, they separated in 1942 after Mamie found out that Louis had been unfaithful. Enraged, Till later choked her close to unconsciousness, to which Mamie responded by throwing scalding water at him. Eventually, Mamie obtained a restraining order against him. After Till violated this repeatedly, a judge forced him to choose between enlistment in the United States Army and imprisonment. Choosing the former, Till enlisted in 1943.

== Criminal charges and death ==
On July 19, 1944, Till was arrested by Military Police, who suspected him and two fellow soldiers of the murder of Allied civilian Anna Zanchi, an Italian woman, and the rape of two heavily pregnant Italian women, Lucrezia Benni and Freida Mari, in Civitavecchia. Benni had a miscarriage the morning after she was raped. Pvt. James Thomas, Jr., was granted immunity in exchange for testimony against Pvts. McMurray and Till. Thomas testified that Till and McMurray took 20 minutes to plan the home invasion and raped Benni and Mari. Military Police investigators had found an envelope at the crime scene addressed to Pvt. McMurray. Under interrogation, Pvt. McMurray confessed and stated that Till said, "Everybody follow me: If anybody turns back I'll blast him." McMurray also testified that he begged Till not to shoot, but that Till had fired a shot into the house which killed Zanchi.

On February 17, 1945, the Court Martial of Privates Till and McMurray began before a panel of seven military judges at Livorno. As with most Allied-on-Allied atrocities, which are not covered by the laws of war, both soldiers, who raised no objection to a joint trial, stood accused of one count of murder and two counts of carnal knowledge in violation of the 92nd Article of War. 2nd Lieutenant Mervin R. Samuel appeared for the prosecution as Trial Judge Advocate, while First Lieutenant John W. Wynn appeared as Defense Counsel for both soldiers.

Fellow African-American GI Private James Thomas, Jr. testified for the prosecution and described witnessing the June 27, 1944, assault, armed robbery, and attempted murder of United States Navy sailor James E. Carter. Private Thomas identified Till as Carter's assailant and alleged that Till had shouted, "I'm going to kill the motherfucking son of a bitch!" Till allegedly attempted to shoot Carter with his own sidearm. Carter managed, however, to jump into a jeep and flee the scene after the gun jammed. According to Pvt. Thomas, the shot that later killed Anna Zanchi had been fired from the M1911 pistol that Louis Till had stolen that morning from the U.S. Navy Serviceman.

Italian witness John Masi testified about witnessing the home invasion and assault against all three women on the evening following the sailor's assault. He testified that Louis Till had fired the shot that killed Anna Zanchi and had told him personally, "Get in the house, or I'll blow your head off!" Both surviving rape victims also gave evidence, but stated that their assailants wore masks and they accordingly declined to identify them as the defendants. Pvt. Thomas did, however, identify Louis Till as having fired the shot that killed Anna Zanchi.

Despite being informed of their right to do so, both soldiers elected not to give evidence in their own defense. As their defense counsel, Lt. Wynn objected to the introduction into evidence of Private McMurray's confession, alleging that it had been made involuntarily. The objection was overruled by Law Member Colonel Roger W. Whitman, who instructed the jury, however, that the confession could only be used as evidence against Private McMurray.

Lt. Wynn also objected in vain to the fact that Pvt. Louis Till's involvement was only established by the uncorroborated testimony of an alleged accomplice. After this objection was also overruled by Col. Whitman, the United States military jury voted unanimously to convict both defendants and sentenced them to death by hanging.

As was the usual practice within the United States Army during the Italian Campaign, both defendants were transferred to the United States Army Disciplinary Training Center near Aversa to await review of their trial and sentencing by the Judge Advocate General's Corps.

On April 18, 1945, Col. Claudius O. Wolfe ruled that the trial record was sufficient to support a verdict of guilty. Regarding the two surviving victims inability to recognize their attackers, Col. Wolfe wrote, "The place, time, and circumstances were such as to exclude reasonable doubt as to their identity."

In support of similarly confirming the verdict and sentences, the Judge Advocate General's Corps cited the relevant passage of A Manual for Courts-Martial, U.S. Army, "A conviction may be based on uncorroborated testimony of an accomplice, but such testimony is of doubtful integrity and is to be considered with great caution."

Private Louis Till was hanged immediately following his co-defendant Private Fred A. McMurray at Aversa on July 2, 1945. Multiple photographs were taken to document before, during and after both executions and are still in existence.

Before his execution, Till had been imprisoned alongside the highly influential American free verse poet Ezra Pound, who was imprisoned for treason and collaboration with both the Nazis and Italian Fascists. Till is accordingly mentioned in lines 171–173 of Canto 74 of Pound's Pisan Cantos:

"Pisa, in the 23rd year of the effort in sight of the Tower
And Till was hung yesterday
for murder and rape with trimmings".

While Pound and Till had met briefly at the MTO DTC near Pisa, the American poet was taking artistic license, as Pvt. Till was actually hanged at Aversa.

U.S. Army Chaplain William O. Strother, an African-American Methodist minister, presided over the funerals of both soldiers at the U.S. Military Cemetery in Naples. Telegrams were dispatched by the War Department to notify both soldiers' next of kin. Despite her later statements that the U.S. Army told her nothing, the War Department telegram sent to Mamie Till read, according to Col. French Maclean, that her husband's cause of death was, "Judicial Asphixiation (sic) due to his own willful misconduct in Italy." In 1948, Private Till's remains were moved to the Oise-Aisne American Cemetery Plot E.

According to Colonel French Maclean, "The Army returned Louis Till's silver ring, bearing the initials 'LT', to his estranged wife in Chicago. In 1955, she let her son Emmett take the ring to visit relatives in Mississippi, where he was soon murdered, resulting in a civil rights case that gained lasting national attention. Authorities identified Emmett's mutilated body, in part, through the distinctive ring."

== Aftermath ==
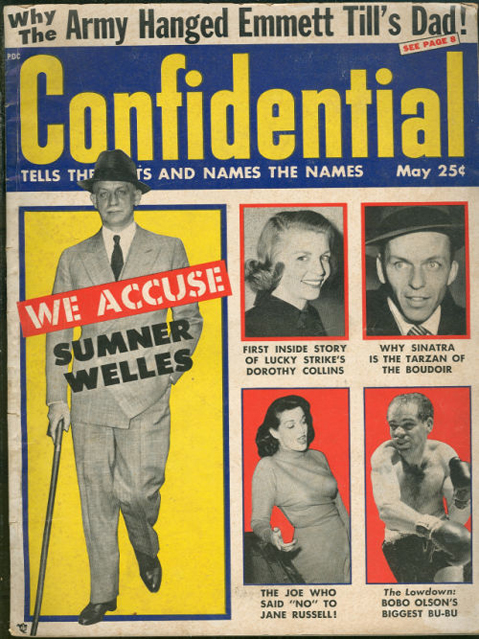
Confidential magazine headlines a story on Louis Till's execution in 1956

The reasons for Till's death were not revealed to his family; Mamie Till's attempts to learn more were comprehensively blocked by the United States Army bureaucracy. The full details of Till's criminal charges and execution emerged 10 years later. On August 28, 1955, 14-year-old Emmett Till was murdered in Mississippi, after allegedly making advances towards Carolyn Bryant, a local white woman. (Years later, a historian claimed that Bryant disclosed to him that she had fabricated testimony that Till made verbal or physical advances towards her in the store. However, the family of Bryant has disputed this claim.) Her husband, Roy, and his half-brother John William "J.W." Milam abducted Till and tortured him to death, then threw his body into the Tallahatchie River. Both were arrested a few days later, charged with and tried for first-degree murder, but were acquitted by an all-white jury in September 1955.

In October 1955, after the murder trial and extremely controversial acquittal gained international media attention, U.S. Senators from Mississippi James Eastland and John C. Stennis uncovered details about Louis Till's court-martial and execution and leaked them to media sources sympathetic to continued segregation. In November 1955, a Leflore County grand jury declined to return an indictment against Emmett Till's two killers for kidnapping, despite a recent magazine interview in which they both had freely admitted to being guilty of that very offense.

In the pro-Segregationist media, various editorials claimed that the National Association for the Advancement of Colored People (NAACP) and the "Yankee" media had lied about the record of Emmett Till's father. Many of these editorials specifically cited an article in Life Magazine, which presented Louis Till as having been killed in action while fighting for his country in France. According to historians, Life magazine was an exception rather than the rule, and no other "northern" media had praised Till or embellished his war record; additionally, Life later published a retraction. However, the impression was left among some southerners that the erroneous Life article was representative of the Northern media in general. Several other Southern editorials went so far as to smear Emmett Till by association with his father's crimes. They even alleged that Till had attempted to commit sexual assault, after the fashion of his father, and thereby justified his murder as an act of vigilantism.

=== Debate over trial and sentencing ===
In 2016, notable African-American novelist and essayist John Edgar Wideman explored the circumstances leading to and including the military conviction of Louis Till in the partly fictional book Writing to Save a Life – The Louis Till File. Wideman examines the trial record and compares it to the trial of Emmett's killers, calling both "a farce", and expresses the belief that the leak of Mr. Till's military records during 1955 was an intentional effort to further demonize Emmett Till and retroactively justify the acquittal of his murderers. Wideman states that Louis Till had been punished for the "Crime of being (Black)", rather than for committing any real crimes, citing the disproportionate punishment of African-American soldiers for rape as well as laws in the United States that defined all sexual encounters between African-American men and white women as rape.

Wideman's analysis of Till's murder trial noted that witness John Masi had initially said, based on their "actions and manner of speech", that one of the two masked men he had argued with before they broke into the house and killed Zanchi was a white person. In Till's rape trial, Wideman also noted that both victims said that they were assaulted in darkness and could not identify their masked attackers, declining to label Till or his co-defendant as suspects. Wideman states that Till's execution, due to these inconsistencies, was racially motivated. Masi had said he could distinguish the voices of black people from white people since he'd lived in Brooklyn for a dozen years. He later changed his statement, asserting during a second interview and during the trial, that he was certain that both men were black.

Ollie Gordon, one of Emmett Till's cousins, was recorded visiting Louis Till's grave in France for the final episode of the ABC documentary series Let the World See, which aired in January 2022. Referencing Wideman's analysis of Till's murder and rape trials, she said "He's laying in this less than honorable area for a crime that we're still not sure that he committed."

== See also ==
- Capital punishment by the United States military
- List of people executed by the United States military
