= Roberts Temple Church of God in Christ =

Coordinates: 41°49′16″N 87°37′34″W

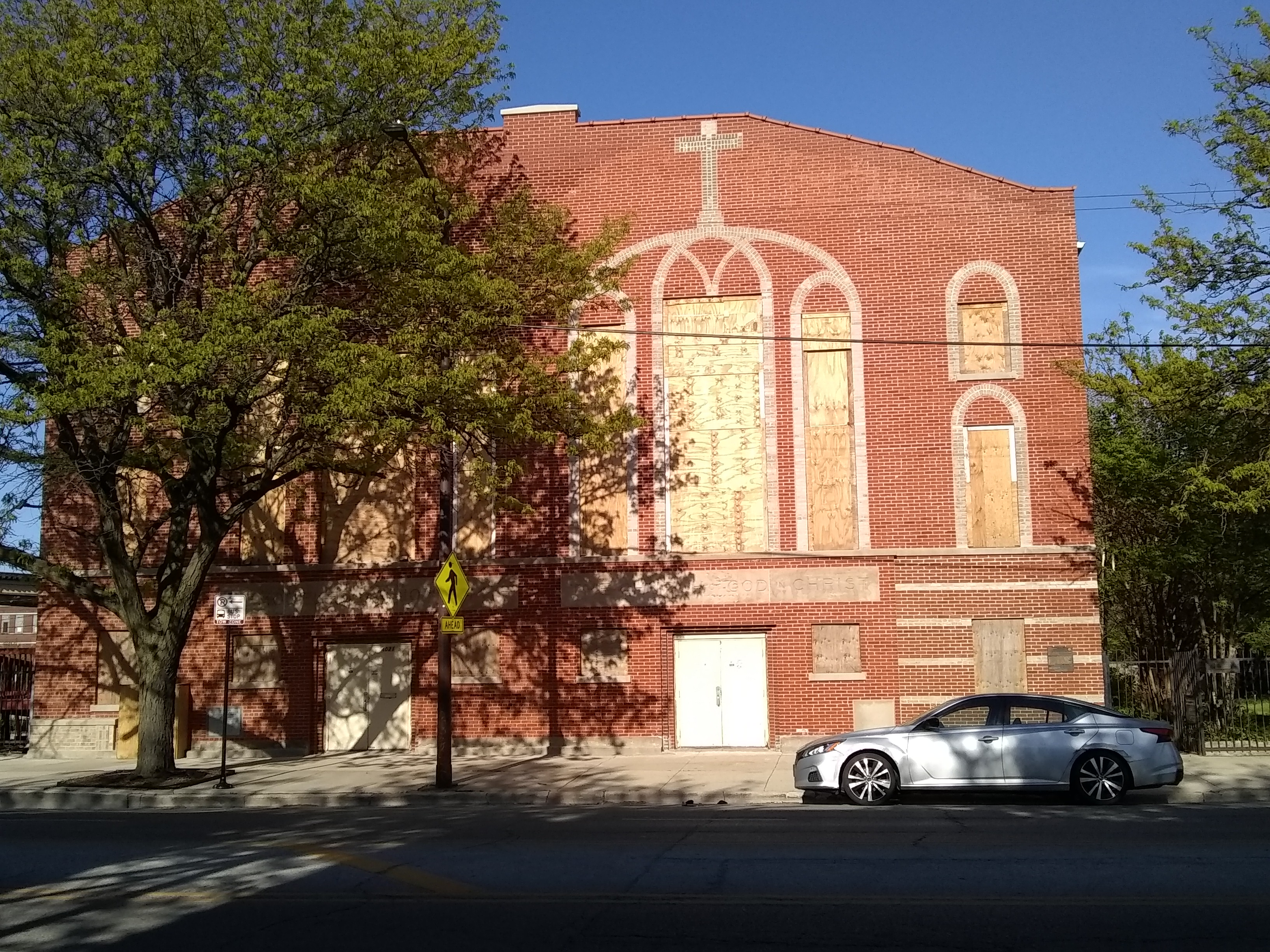
- Roberts Temple Church of God in Christ in 2025

- Location within Chicago metropolitan area
- Location: 4021 S. State Street, Chicago, Illinois

History
- Founded: 1916
- Built: 1922

Site notes
- Architect: Edward G. McClellan

Roberts Temple Church of God in Christ is a Christian house of worship located in the Bronzeville neighborhood of Chicago, Illinois. The church was the site of Emmett Till's open-casket funeral in 1955.

The church was designated as a Chicago Landmark in 2005 and was included on the National Trust for Historic Preservation's 2020 list of 11 Most Endangered Historic Places.

The Church was designated as part of Emmett Till and Mamie Till-Mobley National Monument on July 25, 2023.

== Establishment ==
Roberts Temple Church of God in Christ was founded by Elder William Roberts in 1916. Its services were held in various Chicago buildings until 1922 when its permanent building was constructed at 4021 S. State Street.

The church was initially built as a one-story brick structure. A second story was added in 1927. In 1992, a tan brick exterior was added and the sanctuary was renovated.

== Funeral of Emmett Till ==
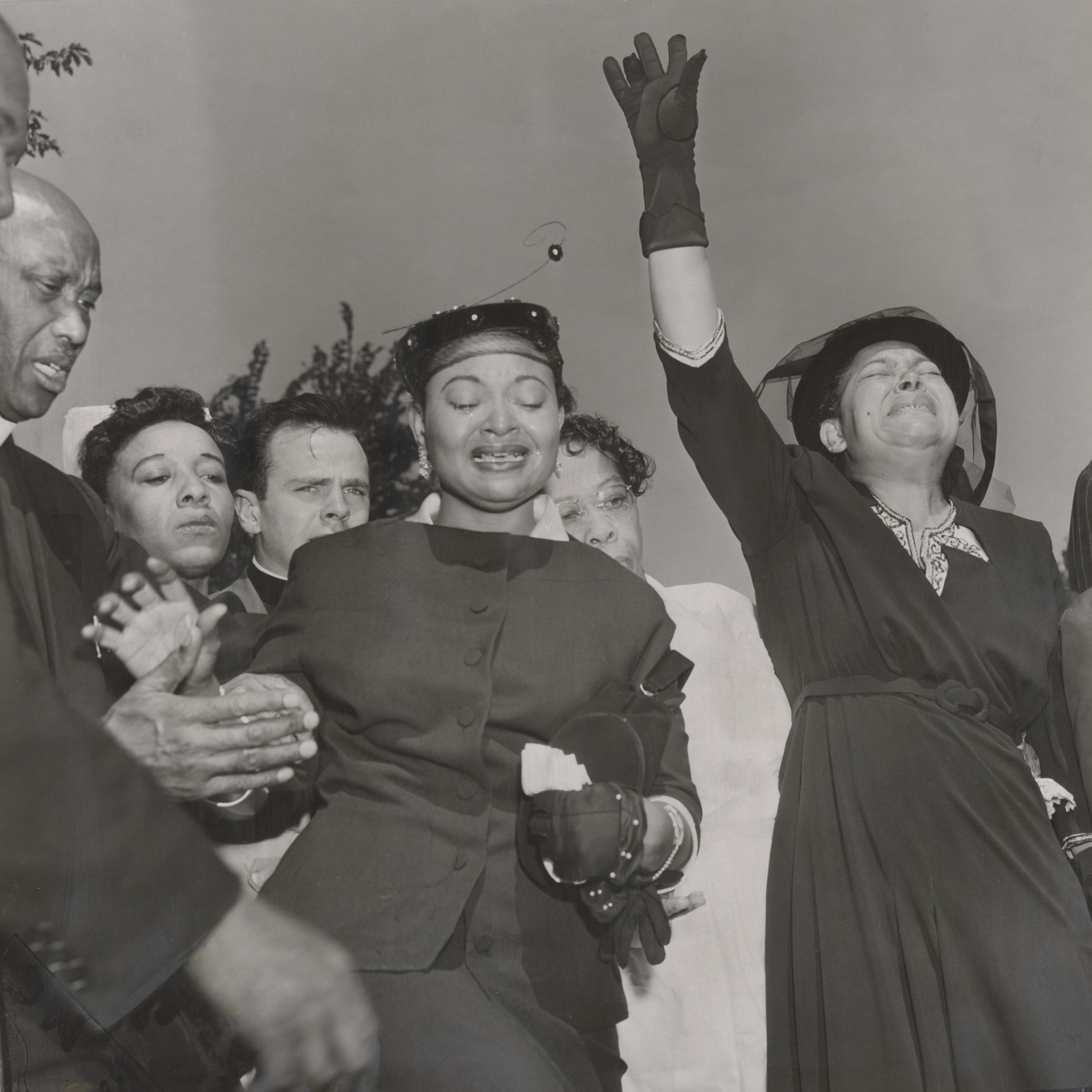
Mamie Till at Emmett Till's funeral, 1955

In the summer of 1955, Emmett Till, a fourteen-year-old African American boy from Chicago was visiting family in Webb, Mississippi. On August 28, Till was abducted, beaten, and lynched by two white men after they accused him of whistling at one of the men's wives.

After Till's murder, his body was returned to Chicago. His mother, Mamie Till-Mobley, decided that his casket would remain open during his visitation and funeral. She is quoted as saying: "There was just no way I could describe what was in that box. No way. And I just wanted the world to see."

A one-day visitation was held at Rayner Funeral Home on Friday, September 2, 1955. It is said that 5,000 people attended, though accounts vary.

The open-casket funeral was held on September 3 at Roberts Temple Church of God in Christ. Roughly 2,000 attendees witnessed the service inside the church with thousands more attending outside. Rev. Isaiah Roberts, pastor of Roberts Temple, presided over the funeral. The eulogy was given by Bishop Louis H. Ford of the St. Paul Church of God in Christ.

== Historic designation ==
The church was named a Chicago landmark in 2005. It was included on the National Trust for Historic Preservation's 2020 list of 11 Most Endangered Historic Places.

In March 2021, Senator Tammy Duckworth introduced legislation that would make the church a national monument for its significance to the Civil Rights Movement.

== See also ==
- List of national monuments of the United States
- Till House: the Chicago landmarked home of Mamie and Emmett Till
