= Llewellyn Cadwaladr =

Welsh operatic tenor

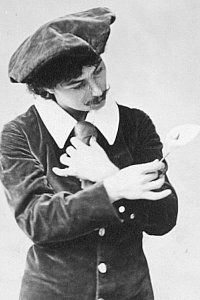
Llewellyn Cadwaladr as the Duke of Dunstable in Patience in 1881

Llewellyn "Lyn" Cadwaladr (1857 – 7 February 1909) was a Welsh operatic tenor who originated roles in, or starred in early tours of, comic operas and operettas of Gilbert and Sullivan, Solomon and Stephens, Robert Planquette and others in the Victorian era, often in America for the D'Oyly Carte Opera Company. He was touring as Ralph in H.M.S. Pinafore when he was asked to create the role of Frederic in the ad hoc 1879 British copyright performance of The Pirates of Penzance.

== Early life and career ==
Cadwaladr was born in 1857 in Ruabon, Denbighshire, the son of Robert Cadwaladr, a mining engineer, and his wife Pamela. His siblings included Thomas (born 1854), David Samuel (born 1859) and Robert (born 1860). He trained at the Royal Irish Academy of Music.

Cadwaladr made his debut in Wagner's Rienzi with the Carl Rosa Opera Company in 1879, aged 22. That June, he joined the D'Oyly Carte Opera Company, playing the leading tenor role of Ralph Rackstraw in Gilbert and Sullivan's H.M.S. Pinafore on tour. During that tour, he became part of an important historical footnote when he originated the role of Frederic in the hastily assembled single British copyright performance of The Pirates of Penzance in Paignton on 30 December 1879. He added another major role, Alexis in The Sorcerer, on tour from March 1881. Carte sent Cadwaladr to New York later in 1881, where he created the role of the Duke of Dunstable in the first authorised American production of Patience at the Standard Theatre. At the same theatre, he originated the role of Charles Lorrimer in the American production of Solomon and Stephens's Claude Duval in March–April 1882. That summer, he toured the English provinces as the Duke in Patience, returning to New York late that year in Carte's productions of Planquette and Farnie's Rip Van Winkle, playing Hans Van Slous and the First Lieutenant. He next created the role of Earl Tolloller in the first New York production of Gilbert and Sullivan's Iolanthe, later touring in the role in Britain throughout most of 1883.

In 1884 he left the D'Oyly Carte Opera Company to appear as Rochester in Planquette and Farnie's Nell Gwynne at London's Avenue and Comedy Theatres. He rejoined D'Oyly Carte in early 1885 at the Savoy Theatre, playing Alexis in the first revival of The Sorcerer, where he was substituting for an ailing Durward Lely. He next toured in repertory as Ralph, Frederic, the Duke of Dunstable and Tolloller and later in the year also as Alexis. He was back in America late in 1885, where he played the role of Nanki-Poo in Carte's tour of Gilbert and Sullivan's The Mikado, appearing in the same role in Germany from late 1886 to early 1887 and then in Britain. He next played Richard Dauntless in the first provincial tour of Ruddigore for the rest of 1887. Through most of 1888, he toured in repertory as Ralph, Frederic, the Duke of Dunstable and Nanki-Poo. From late 1888 to early 1889, he starred as Colonel Fairfax in the first provincial tour of The Yeomen of the Guard.

== Last years ==
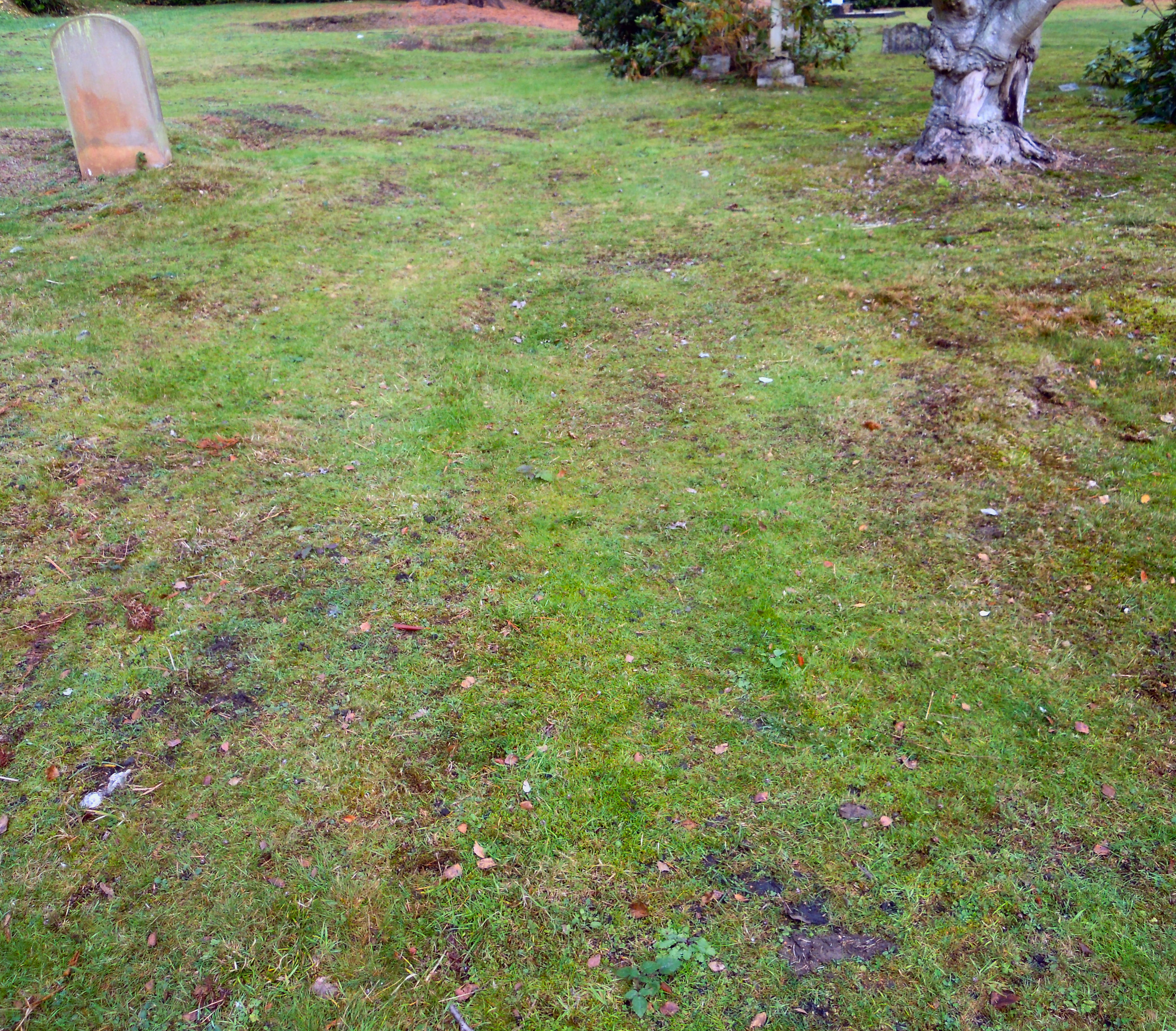
Cadwaladr's grave in Brookwood Cemetery

He again left D'Oyly Carte in July 1889, taking roles at London's Opera Comique in the operettas Castle of Como, Gretna Green and Les Cloches de Corneville. He next toured in South America in 1890 as the leading tenor with Edwin Cleary's English Comic Opera Company, in various roles including Ralph, Frederic, Nanki-Poo and the Defendant in Trial by Jury, among others. In 1893, he again rejoined D'Oyly Carte, touring in his old Gilbert and Sullivan tenor roles and also starring as John Manners in Haddon Hall, Captain Fitzbattleaxe in Utopia, Limited, Marco in The Gondoliers, and Vasquez in The Chieftain.

In later years, he appeared in London in Edwardian musical comedy, including A Greek Slave at Daly's Theatre in 1898–99, and in musical and operatic sketches in variety halls. In Australia in 1904, he briefly toured as Richard Dauntless in Ruddigore and Claude Melnotte in Castle of Como.

Cadwaladr died in Chelsea in London in 1909. He is buried in an unmarked grave in the Actors' Acre in Brookwood Cemetery.

== Sources ==
- Ainger, Michael (2002). Gilbert and Sullivan – A Dual Biography. Oxford: Oxford University Press. ISBN 0-19-514769-3.
