= Tallahatchie County Courthouse =

- Tallahatchie County Second District Courthouse
- U.S. National Register of Historic Places
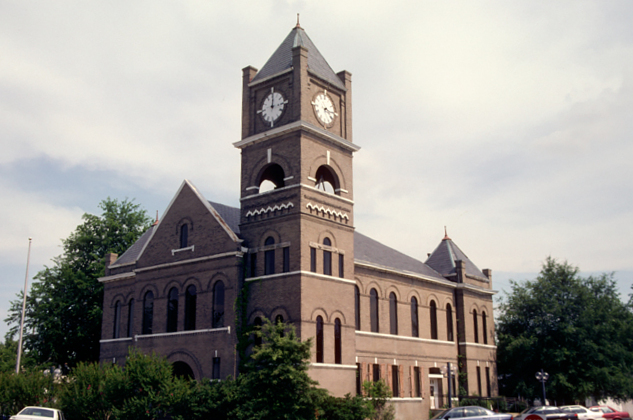

- Location within Mississippi Location within the United States
- Interactive map showing the location of Tallahatchie County Second District Courthouse
- Location: 108 Main St., Sumner, Mississippi
- Coordinates: 33°58′13″N 90°22′10″W
- Area: less than one acre
- Built: 1908
- Built by: Hull, F.B. Construction Co.
- Architect: Hull, W.S.
- Architectural style: Romanesque
- NRHP reference No.: 07000149
- Added to NRHP: March 6, 2007

The Tallahatchie County Second District Courthouse is located in Sumner, Mississippi. The county courthouse was listed on the National Register of Historic Places on March 6, 2007. It is located at 108 Main Street. The two-story brick courthouse building was constructed in 1910 in a Richardsonian Romanesque architecture style with a four-story tower on one corner. It was the site of the September 1955 Emmett Till murder trial. It has been restored to its appearance at the time of the trial, "to house a museum dedicated to the memory of the events surrounding Emmett Till's murder and trial. The project was expanded to focus on all the sites associated with the events. A driving tour has been developed and marked." As of 2018 there is no museum in the Courthouse.

The Emmett Till Interpretive Center is across the street from the Courthouse.

The Courthouse was designated as part of Emmett Till and Mamie Till-Mobley National Monument on July 25, 2023.

== See also ==
- List of national monuments of the United States
- National Register of Historic Places listings in Mississippi
