= Emmett Till and Mamie Till-Mobley National Monument =

- U.S. National Monument
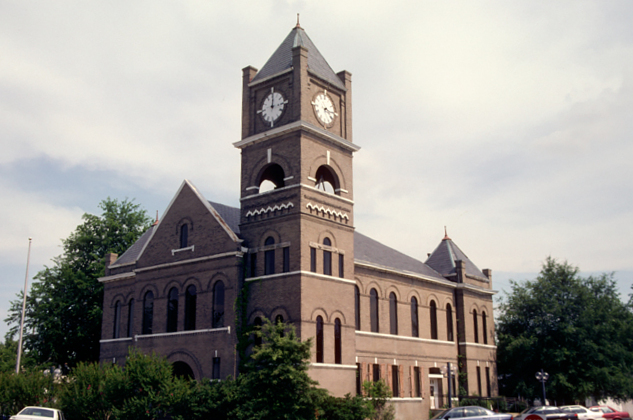
- Tallahatchie County Courthouse, the site of the September 1955 trial and acquittal
- Location: Tallahatchie County, Mississippi and Chicago, Illinois
- Coordinates: 33°51′38″N 90°16′29″W
- Area: 5.7 acres (2.3 ha)
- Visitation: 3,763 (2025)
- Website: Emmett Till and Mamie Till-Mobley National Monument

Significant dates
- Added to NRHP: July 25, 2023
- Designated NMON: July 25, 2023

The Emmett Till and Mamie Till-Mobley National Monument is a United States national monument that honors Emmett Till, a 14-year-old African American teenager who was abducted, tortured, and lynched in Mississippi in 1955, and his mother, Mamie Till, who became an advocate in the Civil Rights Movement. The monument includes three sites, one in Illinois and two in Mississippi, with a total area of 5.7 acres (2.3 ha). The monument is managed by the National Park Service and was established by President Joe Biden on July 25, 2023, which would have been Emmett Till's 82nd birthday.

== Sites ==
=== Illinois ===
- The Roberts Temple Church of God in Christ, Bronzeville, Chicago. The church was the site where Mamie Till insisted on an open casket funeral service for Emmett in September 1955 to let the world know what had been done to her son. More than ten thousand attended the services for Till.

=== Mississippi ===
- Graball Landing on the Tallahatchie River, near Glendora. It is believed to be the site where Till's body was retrieved from the river. 4.31 acres was donated to the National Park Service for the monument.
- Tallahatchie County Second District Courthouse in Sumner. This was where the September 1955 trial of and acquittal of Roy Bryant and J. W. Milam for Till's murder took place. Tallahatchie County donated the courthouse and the adjacent Emmett Till Interpretative Center to the NPS through the National Park Foundation.

== See also ==
- List of national monuments of the United States
- Civil rights movement in popular culture
- Till House
