= Till House =

House in Chicago, Illinois

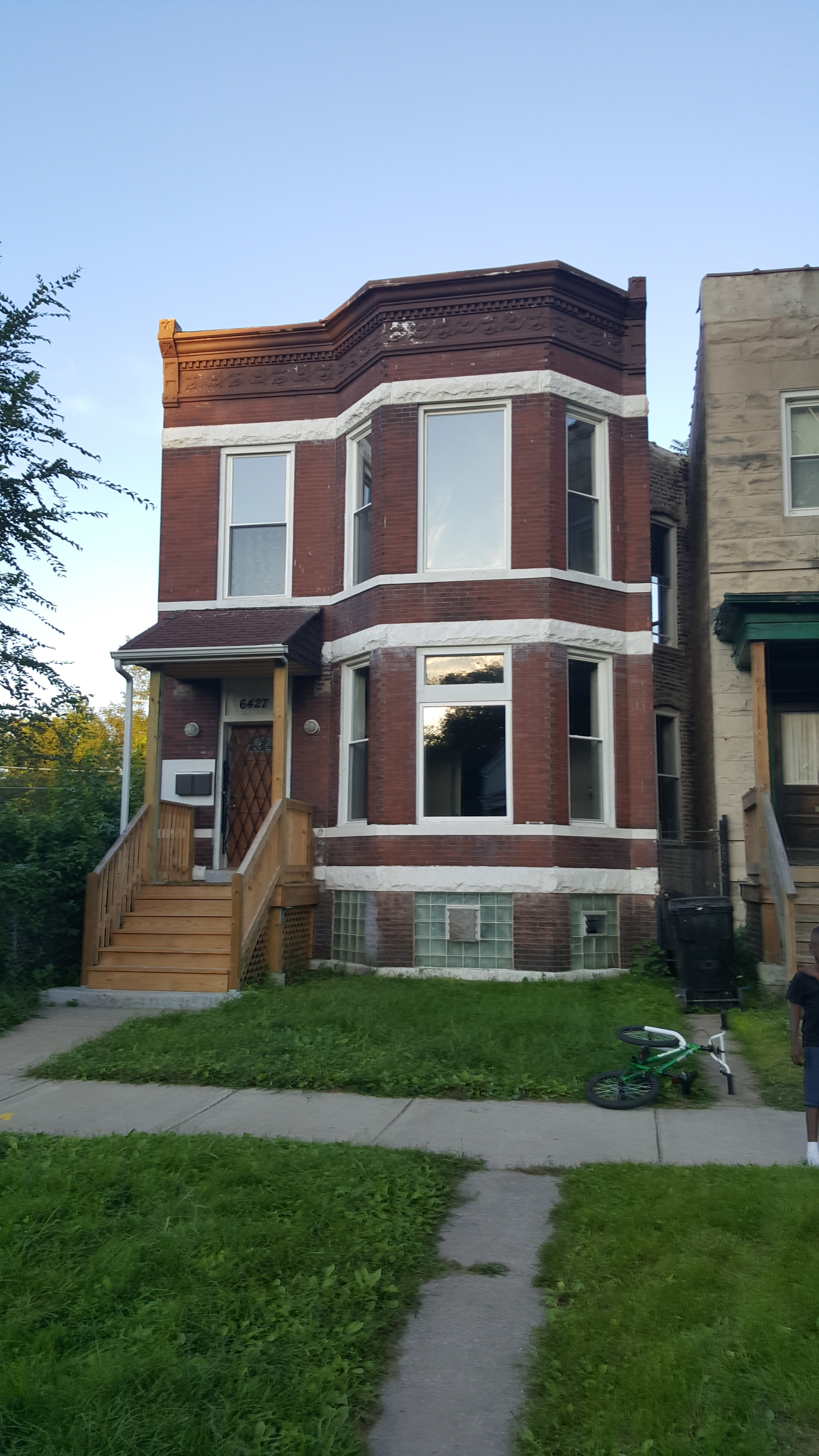
The Chicago two-flat at 6427 S. St. Lawrence Avenue where Emmett Till lived with his mother, Mamie Till, in the 1950s

The Emmett Till and Mamie Till-Mobley House (also called the Till House Museum) is a two-family house in Chicago that in the 1950s was the home of Emmett Till and his mother, Mamie Till. Located on South St. Lawrence Avenue in West Woodlawn, it was declared a Chicago Landmark in 2021, upon application of its then new owner Blacks-in-Green (BIG), a community and environmental non-profit development organization. It received a National Trust for Historic Preservation award in 2022.

== See also ==
- Emmett Till and Mamie Till-Mobley National Monument
