= Oise-Aisne American Cemetery Plot E =

Section of American military cemetery in France

Coordinates: 49°12′01″N 3°33′02″E

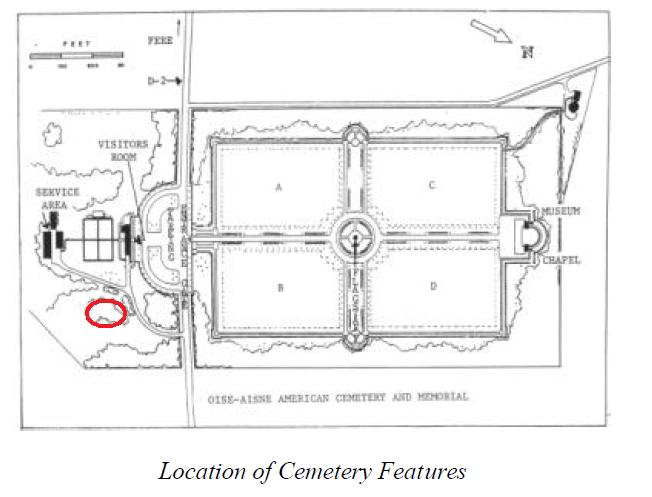
Location of Plot E highlighted in red. The official ABMC guide pamphlet (from which this map is derived) does not show Plot E

The Oise-Aisne American Cemetery Plot E is the fifth plot at the Oise-Aisne American Cemetery and Memorial, an American military cemetery in northern France, which currently contains the remains of 94 American military prisoners, all of whom were executed by hanging or firing squad under military authority for crimes committed during or shortly after World War II. Oise-Aisne American Cemetery and Memorial has four main burial plots (A, B, C and D) containing the remains of 6,013 service personnel, all of whom died decades earlier during World War I.

== Description ==
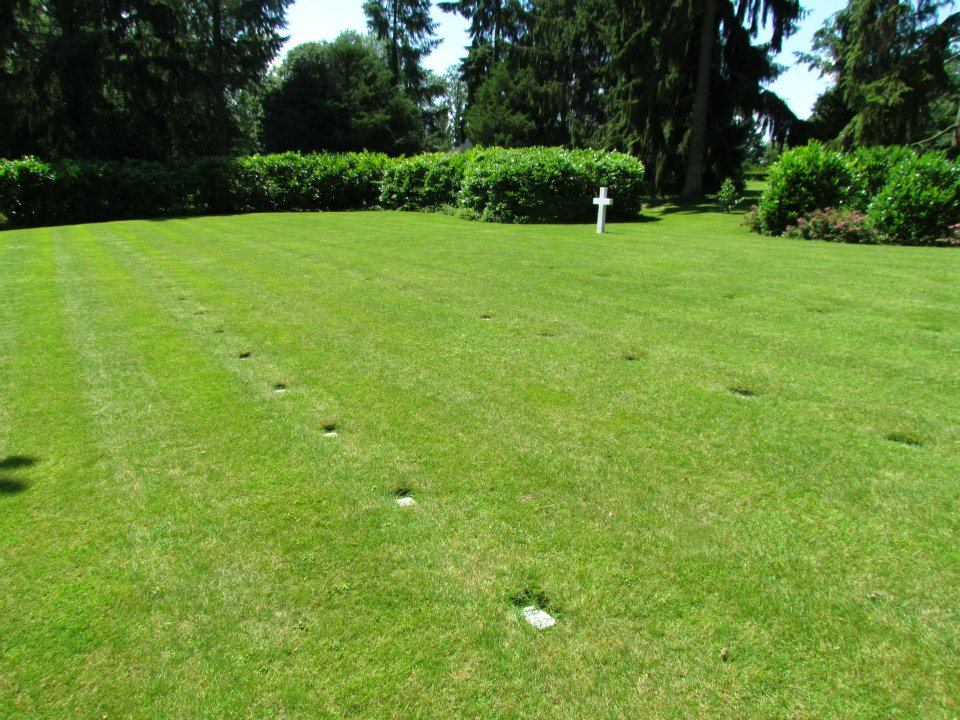
View across Plot E

The United States Army executed 98 servicemen following general courts martial for murder or rape in the European Theatre of Operations during the Second World War. The remains of these servicemen were originally buried near the site of their executions, which took place in countries as far apart as England, France, Belgium, Germany, Italy and Algeria. In 1949, the remains of these men were re-interred in France at the Oise-Aisne American Cemetery and Memorial in Plot E, a private section specifically built to hold what the Graves Registration Service referred to as "the dishonored dead"; per standard practice, all had been dishonorably discharged from the US Army the day before their executions.

The victims of those interred in Plot E were 26 fellow American soldiers (all murdered) and 71 British, French, German, Italian, Polish and Algerian civilians (both male and female) who were raped or murdered.

Plot E is approximately 100 metres (110 yards) away from the main cemetery and is a separate, hidden section. Access is difficult and visitors are not encouraged, though the section is maintained by cemetery caretakers who periodically mow the lawn area and trim the hedges. One cemetery employee described Plot E as a "house of shame" and a "perfect anti-memorial".

No US flag is permitted to fly over the section, and the numbered graves lie with their backs turned to the main cemetery on the other side of the road.

== Burials at Plot E ==
After being held from the public from the time of the creation of Plot E, the names and grave locations of the men buried there became available in 2009 following a Freedom of Information Act request. Prior to that release, the public could not determine who was buried in a particular grave, as the graves are only marked with numbers.

All but one of the individuals interred in Plot E were found guilty at general court martial of the capital crimes of rape, murder or both. The only individual buried in Plot E who had not been convicted of rape or murder was Eddie Slovik (formerly Row 3, Grave 65), who was executed for desertion on 31 January 1945. His wife, Antoinette Slovik, petitioned the Army for her husband's remains and his pension until her death in 1979. Slovik's case was taken up in 1981 by a former commissioner of Macomb County, Michigan, Bernard V. Calka, a Polish-American World War II veteran, who continued to press the Army for the return of Slovik's remains. In 1987, he persuaded President Ronald Reagan to grant the petition request. In response, Calka raised $5,000 ($14,170 in 2025) to pay for the exhumation and reinterment at Detroit's Woodmere Cemetery, where Slovik was reburied next to his wife.

African American murderer Louis Till and father of Emmett Till is among the interred convicts.

Additional background information (e.g. place of enlistment and year of birth, etc.) regarding the condemned men can be found by entering the relevant service number into Online World War II Indexes & Records.

=== Current ===
The following table provides names, serial numbers, locations, and associated grave numbers of deceased interred in Plot E of the Oise-Aisne American Cemetery.

Name	Serial number	Row	Grave number	Details of capital offense & notes
Agee, Amos	34163762	1	14	Hanged in the European Theater on 3 March 1945 with convicts John C. Smith and Frank Watson for rape
Anderson, Roy W.	35407199	2	29	Hanged in the European Theater on 25 October 1944
Bailey, Milbert	34151488	4	90	Hanged in the European Theater on 19 April 1945
Baldwin, Walter J.	34020111	2	43	Hanged in the European Theater on 17 January 1945
Bennerman, Sidney, Jr	34174757	3	57	Executed by firing squad in the European Theater on 15 October 1945
Brinson, Eliga	34052175	4	93	Hanged at Shepton Mallet on 11 August 1944 with Willie Smith for rape
Burns, Lee A.	38520648	4	74	Hanged in Aversa, Italy, Mediterranean Theatre of World War II on 11 March 1945
Clarke, Ernest L.	33212946	3	68	Along with co-convicted Augustine M. Guerra, raped and strangled 15-year-old Elizabeth Green at Ashford on 22 August 1944
Clay Jr, Matthew	38490561	1	3	Hanged in the European Theater on 4 June 1945
Cooper, John D.	34562464	4	81	Hanged in the European Theater on 9 January 1945
Crews, Otis B.	14057830	2	30	Hanged in the Mediterranean Theater on 21 February 1945
Davis, Arthur E.	36788637	4	82	Hanged in the European Theater on 22 November 1944
Davis, Lee A.	18023362	3	61	Convicted of raping Muriel Fawden after fatally shooting her friend, 19-year-old Cynthia June Lay, near Savernake Hospital, Marlborough, Wiltshire on 28 September 1943
Davis, William E.	33541888	1	19	Hanged in the European Theater on 27 December 1944
Davison, Tommie	34485174	3	60	Hanged in the European Theater on 29 March 1945
Donnelly, Robert L.	13131982	4	95	Hanged in the Mediterranean Theatre on 31 May 1944
Downes, William C.	33519814	1	16	Hanged in the European Theater on 28 February 1945
Ervin, Charlie, Jr	34042926	3	54	Executed by firing squad in Italy, Mediterranean Theatre on 19 October 1945
Farrell, Arthur J.	32559163	1	21	Hanged in the European Theater on 19 January 1945
Gordon, Tom	34091950	1	10	Hanged in the European Theater on 10 July 1945
Grant, General L.	34557976	3	59	Hanged in Italy, Mediterranean Theatre of World War II on 11 March 1945
Green, George, Jr	38476751	2	36	Hanged in the European Theater on 15 May 1945
Guerra, Augustine M.	38458023	2	44	Along with Ernest L. Clarke, convicted of the rape and murder of 15-year-old Elizabeth Green at Ashford on 22 August 1944
Hall, Willie	33268841	4	83	
Harris, Wiley, Jr	6924547	4	92	Hanged at Shepton Mallet on 26 May 1944 for fatally stabbing a man
Harrison, William, Jr	15089828	3	62	Raped and strangled 7-year-old Patricia Wylie in Northern Ireland on 25 September 1944.
Heard, Haze	34562354	2	38	Hanged in the European Theater on 21 May 1945
Hendricks, James E.	33453189	1	13	Hanged near Plumaudan on 24 November 1944 for the murder of Victor Bignon and the attempted rape of his wife Noémie
Holden, Mervin	38226564	1	8	Hanged in Namur, Belgium on 30 January 1945
Hopper, Benjamin F.	32720571	1	7	Hanged in the European Theater on 29 March 1945
Jefferies, Charles H.	33181343	4	78	Hanged in Italy, Mediterranean Theatre of World War II on 5 July 1945
Johnson, Willie	38270465	2	28	Hanged in the European Theater on 26 June 1945
Jones, Cubia (a.k.a. Parson)	34563790	1	15	Raped and murdered Joyce Brown, who was pregnant, on 3 December 1944
Jones, James L.	34221343	4	84	Hanged in the European Theater on 19 April 1945
Jones, John T.	38315973	2	48	Hanged in Italy, Mediterranean Theatre of World War II on 5 July 1945
Jones, Kinney	34120505	2	42	Hanged in Italy, Mediterranean Theatre of World War II on 20 March 1945
Jordan, Charlie H.	14066430	2	40	Hanged in the European Theater on 22 November 1944
Kendrick, James E.	14026995	1	5	Hanged in Oran, Algeria, North African Theater on 17 July 1943
Kluxdal, Paul M.	36395076	2	35	Hanged in the European Theater on 31 October 1944
Leatherberry, John C.	34472451	4	86	Hanged at Shepton Mallet on 16 March 1944 for the murder of a taxi driver
Lucas, William N.	36639075	4	96	
Mack, John H.	34042053	1	4	Hanged in Italy, Mediterranean Theatre of World War II on 20 March 1945
Mack, William	32620461	3	63	Executed in Plabennec, France, on 15 February 1945
Mahoney, Joseph J.	12008332	1	11	
Mariano, Blake W.	38011593	1	12	29-year-old gunner with the 191st Tank Battalion, hanged at Loire Disciplinary Training Center in Le Mans, France on 10 October 1945 for raping two women, aged 21 and 54, and murdering their 41-year-old companion in Lauf, Germany on 15 April 1945
Martinez, Aniceto	38168482	2	39	Convicted of raping 75-year-old Agnes Cope on 6 August 1944
Maxey, Curtis L.	34554198	3	71	Hanged in St. Tropez, France, Mediterranean Theatre on 16 November 1944
McCarter, William J.	34675988	4	91	Hanged in the European Theater on 28 May 1945
McGhee Sr, Shelton	34529025	1	6	Hanged in the Mediterranean Theatre of World War II on 4 May 1945
McMurray, Fred A.	38184335	1	2	Convicted along with Louis Till for the murder of an Italian woman and the rape of two others, in Civitavecchia. Executed by hanging at United States Army Disciplinary Training Center north of Pisa on 2 July 1945
Nelson, Henry W.	35726029	1	1	Hanged in Italy, Mediterranean Theatre of World War II on 5 July 1945
Newman, Oscar N.	35226382	1	80	Hanged in the European Theater on 29 November 1944
Norris, Clete O.	37082314	4	79	Hanged in the European Theater on 31 May 1945
Ortiz, Victor	30405077	4	87	Hanged in the European Theater on 21 June 1945
Parker, Woodrow	34561139	3	56	Executed by firing squad in the European Theater on 15 October 1945
Pearson, Robert L.	38326741	1	22	Convicted along with Parson Jones for the rape and murder of Joyce Brown, who was pregnant, on 3 December 1944
Pennyfeather, William D.	32801627	3	66	Hanged in the European Theater on 18 November 1944
Philpot, Henry C.	39080069	4	89	Hanged in the European Theater on 10 September 1945
Pittman, Willie A.	34400976	3	50	Hanged in Sicily, Mediterranean Theatre of World War II on 30 August 1943
Pygate, Benjamin	33741021	4	85	Executed by firing squad at Shepton Mallet on 28 November 1944 for stabbing a fellow American soldier
Robinson, Charles M.	38164425	3	70	Hanged in the European Theater on 28 September 1945
Rollins, Alvin R.	34716953	3	51	Hanged in the European Theater on 31 May 1945
Sanders, James B.	34124233	3	58	Hanged in the European Theater on 25 October 1944
Schmiedel, Werner E. (a.k.a. Robert Lane)	7041115	3	53	Hanged in the Mediterranean Theater on 11 June 1945
Scott, Richard B.	38040012	2	45	Hanged in the European Theater on 18 November 1944
Skinner, Robert L.	35802328	3	64	Hanged with Yancy Waiters in the village of Hameau au Pigeon in Quettetot on the Cherbourg peninsula after being convicted of murder and rape. Among spectators at their execution were twenty French witnesses, including nineteen-year-old Marie Osouf, the girl who was raped, and the family of Auguste Lebarillier (Marie's boyfriend), who was murdered
Smalls, Abraham	34512812	1	23	Hanged in Mediterranean Theatre of World War II on 27 March 1945
Smith, Charles H.	36337437	4	77	Hanged in Algiers, North African Theater of Operations on 6 September 1943
Smith, George E., Jr	33288266	3	52	Convicted for the murder of British diplomat Sir Eric Teichman by court-martial at RAF Attlebridge on 3 December 1944. He was executed by hanging on the gallows at HMP Shepton Mallet on 8 May 1945 (i.e. VE Day), despite appeals for clemency, including from Lady Ellen Teichman
Smith, John C.	33214953	3	67	Hanged in the European Theater on 3 March 1945 with Amos Agee and Frank Watson for rape
Smith, Willie	3456556	3	69	Hanged at Shepton Mallet on 11 August 1944 with Eliga Brinson for rape
Spears, Charles E.	32337619	1	18	Hanged in Oran, Algeria, North African Theater of Operations on 18 April 1944
Spencer, Elwood, J.	33739343	2	33	Hanged in Lemur, Belgium on 30 January 1945
Spinks, Mansfield	36793241	3	49	Executed by firing squad in Italy, Mediterranean Theatre on 19 October 1945
Stroud, Harvey	33215131	2	26	Hanged in Sicily, Mediterranean Theatre of World War II on 30 August 1943
Taylor, John W.	37485128	1	24	Hanged in Italy, Mediterranean Theatre of World War II on 20 March 1945
Thomas, Madison	38265363	4	76	Convicted by a court martial in Plymouth of raping Beatrice Maud Reynolds in a field at Albaston (near Gunnislake, Cornwall) on 26 July 1944 and hanged at HMP Shepton Mallet on 12 October 1944
Till, Louis	36392273	4	73	Convicted with Fred A. McMurray for the murder of an Italian woman and the rape of two others in Civitavecchia. Executed by hanging at United States Army Disciplinary Training Center north of Pisa on July 2, 1945
Twiggs, James W.	38265086	4	88	Hanged in the European Theater on 22 January 1945
Valentine, Leo	32954278	2	41	Hanged in the European Theater on 29 November 1944
Waiters, Yancy	37499079	2	31	Hanged with Robert L. Skinner on 10 February 1945 for the murder of Auguste Lebarillier and rape of Marie Osouf
Waters, John H.	32337934	2	46	Hanged at Shepton Mallet on 10 February 1944 for fatally shooting his girlfriend
Watson, Frank, Jr	34793522	3	55	Hanged in the European Theater on 3 March 1945 with Amos Amos and John C. Smith for rape
Watson, Ray	33139251	2	25	Hanged in Mediterranean Theatre of World War II on 29 August 1944
Watson, Joseph	39610125	1	17	Hanged in the European Theater on 9 November 1944
White, Armstead	34401104	2	47	Hanged in Sicily, Mediterranean Theatre of World War II on 30 August 1943
White, David	34400884	3	72	Hanged in Sicily, Mediterranean Theatre of World War II on 30 August 1943
Whitfield, Clarence	34672443	2	37	Hanged in Normandy, France, European Theater on 14 August 1944
Williams, Ellsworth	34200976	2	32	Hanged in Germany, European Theater on 5 January 1946
Williams, John	32794118	4	94	Hanged in the European Theater on 19 April 1945
Williams, Olin W.	34649494	1	20	Hanged in the European Theater on 9 March 1945
Wilson, J. P.	32484756	1	9	Hanged in the European Theater on 2 February 1945
Wimberly, Willie J.	36392154	2	34	Hanged in the European Theater on 9 November 1944
Wray, Robert	34461589	4	75	Hanged in the European Theater on 20 August 1945

=== Former ===
The following table lists information about deceased formerly interred in Plot E of the Oise-Aisne American Cemetery.

Name	Serial number	Row	Grave number	Details of capital offense and notes
Miranda, Alex F.	39297382	2	27	Executed by firing squad at HMP Shepton Mallet on 30 May 1944 for the murder of a fellow American soldier. In 1990, his remains were returned to the United States for reburial at Santa Ana Cemetery in Santa Ana, California.
Slovik, Eddie	36896415	3	65	Executed by firing squad in France on 31 January 1945 for desertion. In 1987, his remains were returned to the United States for reburial at Woodmere Cemetery in Detroit, Michigan.

== See also ==
- Capital punishment by the United States military
- List of people executed by the United States military
- HM Prison Shepton Mallet – provides details of the 18 American servicemen executed there who were later moved to Plot E
- Fort Leavenworth Military Prison Cemetery – American cemetery which holds the remains of German WWII POWs
