= Oise-Aisne American Cemetery and Memorial =

ABMC World War I cemetery in Picardie, France

- Battle Monuments Commission
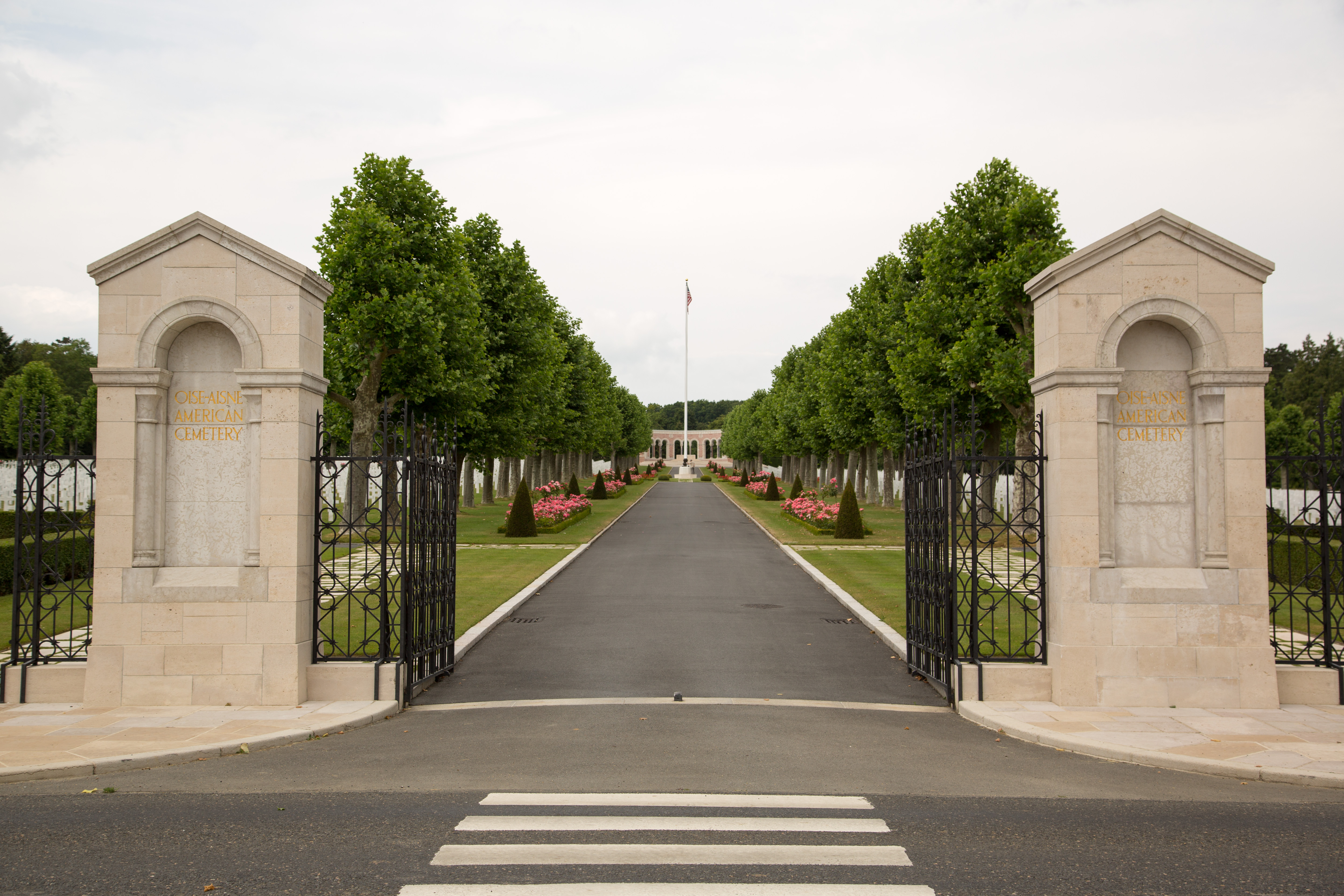
- Oise-Aisne
- Used for those deceased World War I
- Established: 1918. (Concentration cemetery 1921)
- Location: 49°12′8″N 3°32′54″E near Fère-en-Tardenois, France
- Designed by: Cram & Ferguson, Boston, Ma. George Gibbs, Jr. (LANDSCAPE)
- Total burials: 6,013
- Unknowns: 597
- Commemorated: 241

The Oise-Aisne American Cemetery and Memorial (French pronunciation: [waz ɛːn]) is an American military cemetery in northern France. Plots A through D contain the graves of 6,013 American soldiers who died while fighting in this vicinity during World War I, 597 of which were not identified, as well as a monument for 241 Americans who were missing in action during battles in the same area and whose remains were never recovered. Included among the soldiers here who lost their lives is poet Joyce Kilmer (1886–1918 †).

A graveyard for former soldiers that were dishonorably discharged and executed for crimes committed during World War II, referred to as Plot E, is nearby. Private Eddie Slovik (1920–1945), the only American soldier executed for desertion during World War II, was buried there until 1987.

== Site ==
The Oise-Aisne American Cemetery lies one and a half miles east of Fère-en-Tardenois, Aisne, Picardy, France and about 14 miles (23 km) northeast of Château-Thierry. It is approximately 70 miles (110 km) northeast of Paris.

The grounds extend to 36.5 acres (14.8 ha) and this is the second of eight large permanent American World War I military cemeteries that are not in the United States. It was initially established on August 2, 1918 by the 42nd Division as a temporary cemetery, but was retained as a permanent cemetery by Congress in 1921. The French government provides the site at no cost for use as a military cemetery. The memorials were designed by Cram and Ferguson and the landscape architect was George Gibbs, Jr.

The cemetery is generally rectangular in shape. The chapel, museum and grave plots are one side of the road and a parking area and the service facilities on the other side. The plots are divided by a walkway with a circular island of grass in the middle. The sides of the cemetery include paths, a privet hedge, and a low stone wall.

== War dead buried at this site ==
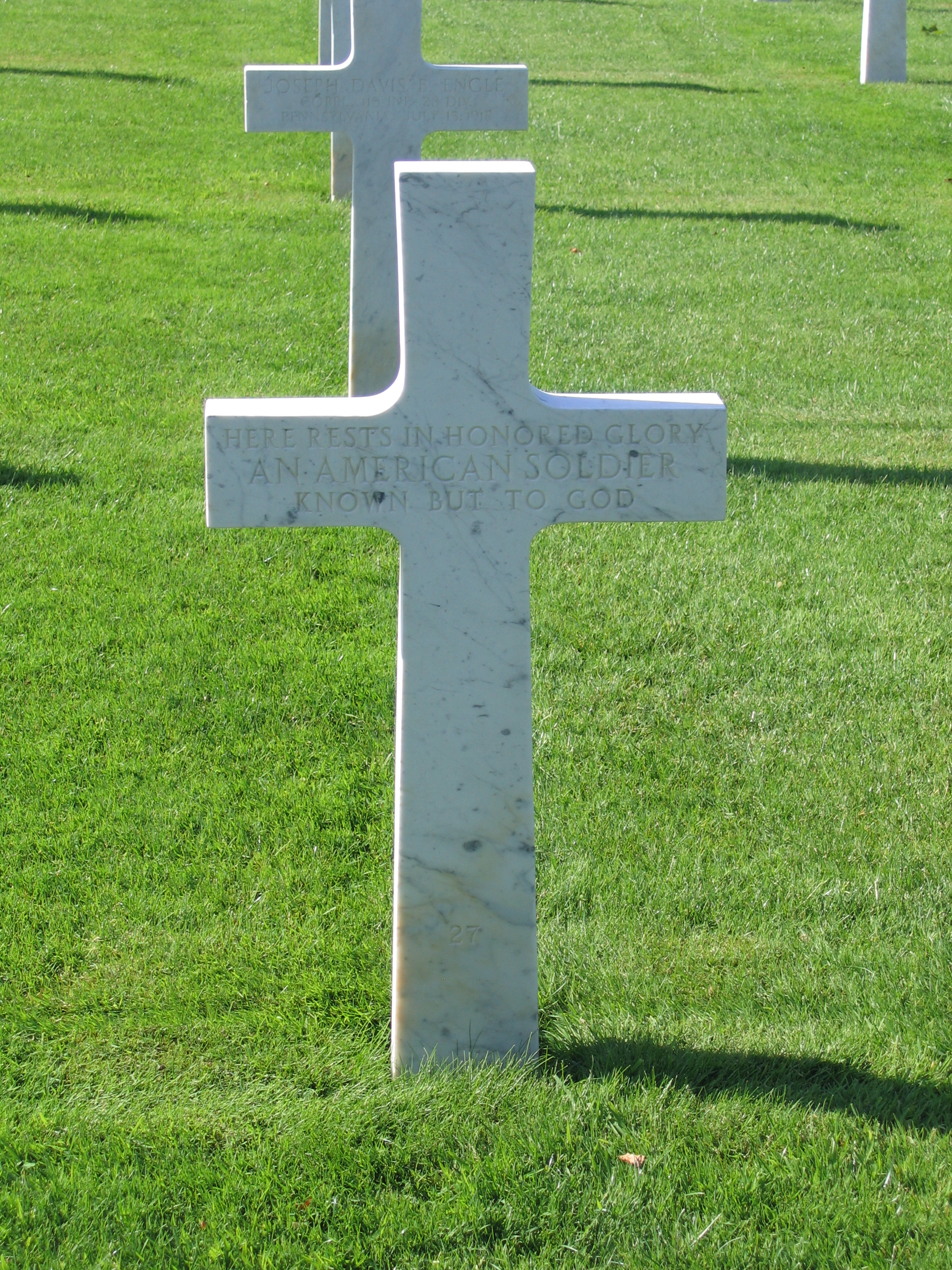
Grave of an unknown soldier

Most of the 6,013 soldiers and support personnel honorably interred at this site died fighting during the Second Battle of the Marne and the Oise-Aisne campaign. The site also includes American servicemen who were buried in temporary cemeteries and were moved to this site when their families requested that they be buried overseas. All 48 of the states that existed at the time, as well as the District of Columbia, are represented. Stars of David mark graves of Jewish soldiers, all others have a Latin Cross. The headstones are made from white marble quarried in Carrara, Italy.

596 graves at this site are for unknown soldiers. Like the Tomb of the Unknowns in Arlington, Virginia, the graves are marked:

HERE RESTS IN HONORED GLORY
AN AMERICAN SOLDIER
KNOWN BUT TO GOD

== The memorial ==
At the far end of the cemetery there is a semi-circular memorial of marble and granite in a Romanesque style. A small chapel is to the memorial's right, and a one-room museum to the left. There are ten double columns that include the Division numbers of American soldiers who fought in this sector, the 1st, 2nd, 3rd, 4th, 26th, 28th, 32nd, 42nd, 77th, and 93rd. The sides of the columns are engraved with images of contemporary equipment such as gas masks and artillery shells. The columns are separated by four statues: two of soldiers, one of St. Michael and one of St. George. There is an inscription on the monument:

THESE ENDURED ALL AND GAVE ALL
THAT HONOR AND JUSTICE MIGHT PREVAIL AND
THAT THE WORLD MIGHT ENJOY FREEDOM AND INHERIT PEACE

The rear of the monument identifies the American Battle Monuments Commission and the architects. On the friese and the exterior walls of the chapel and museum are 23 carved shields representing the branch and service insignia that served in this region of France, and the museum and chapel both include stylized versions of the Great Seal of the United States.

The names of 241 American soldiers missing in the area who were never found or whose bodies were never identified are inscribed on the walls of the chapel. The museum includes a dedicatory relief in English and French as well as a large map of the Aisne-Marne region.

== Plot E ==
The cemetery also contains an area known as Oise-Aisne American Cemetery Plot E, which contains the remains of the "dishonorable dead"—96 Americans who were dishonorably discharged from the US Army before being executed for crimes of rape or murder. Plot E is separate from the main cemetery, in an area secluded by hedges and accessible only through a door in the superintendent's office.

== Gallery ==
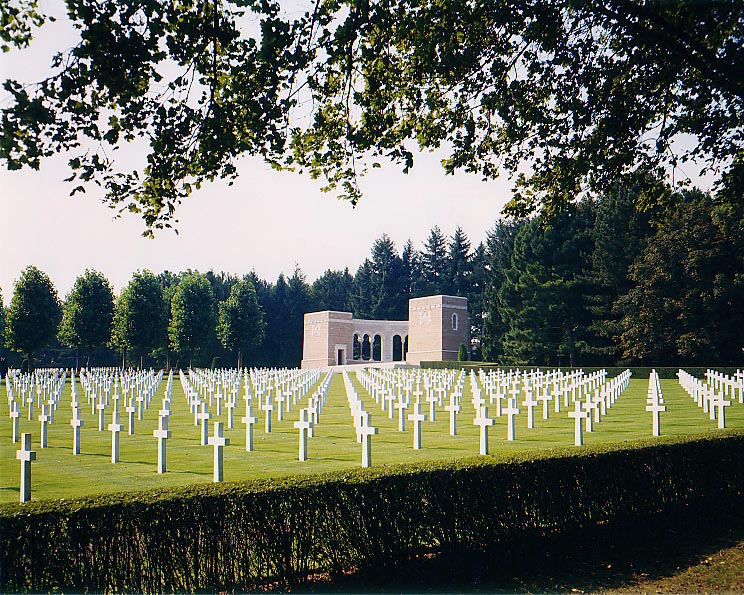

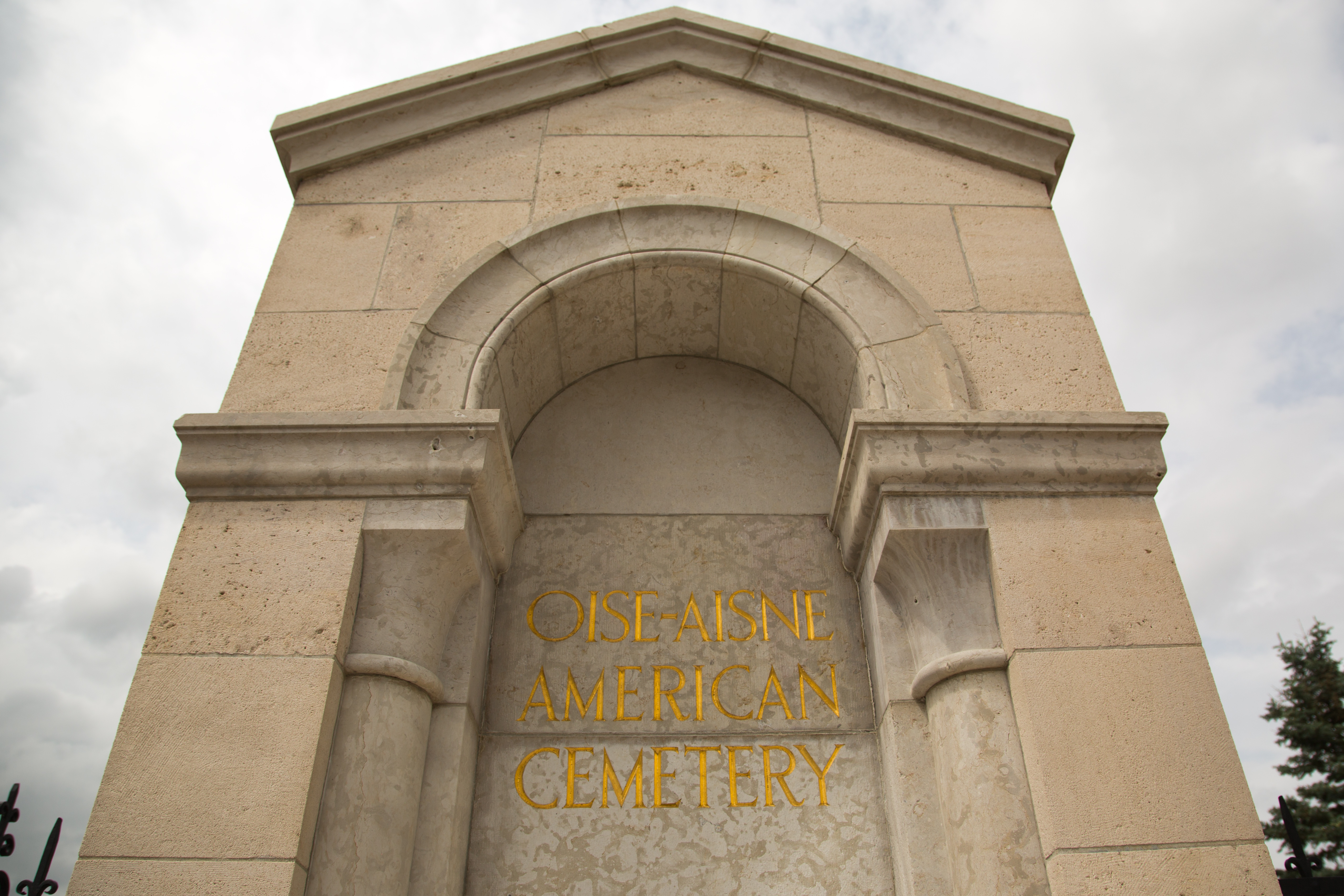

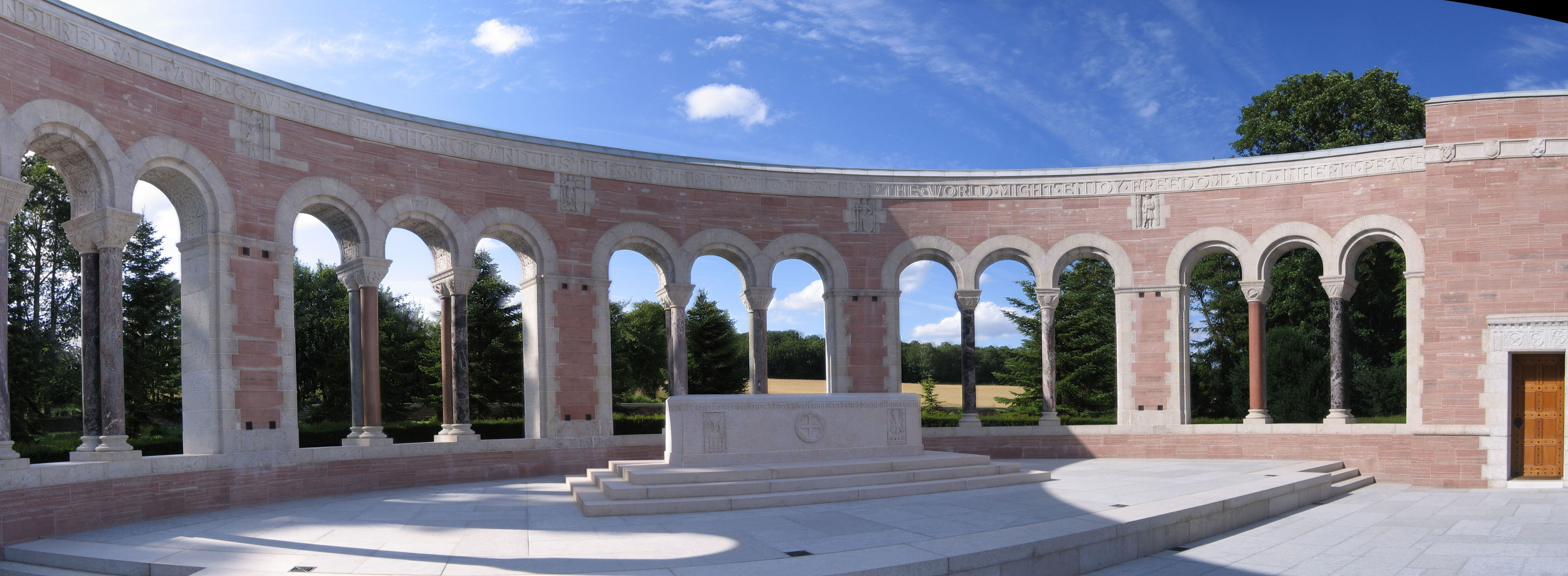
The Memorial.

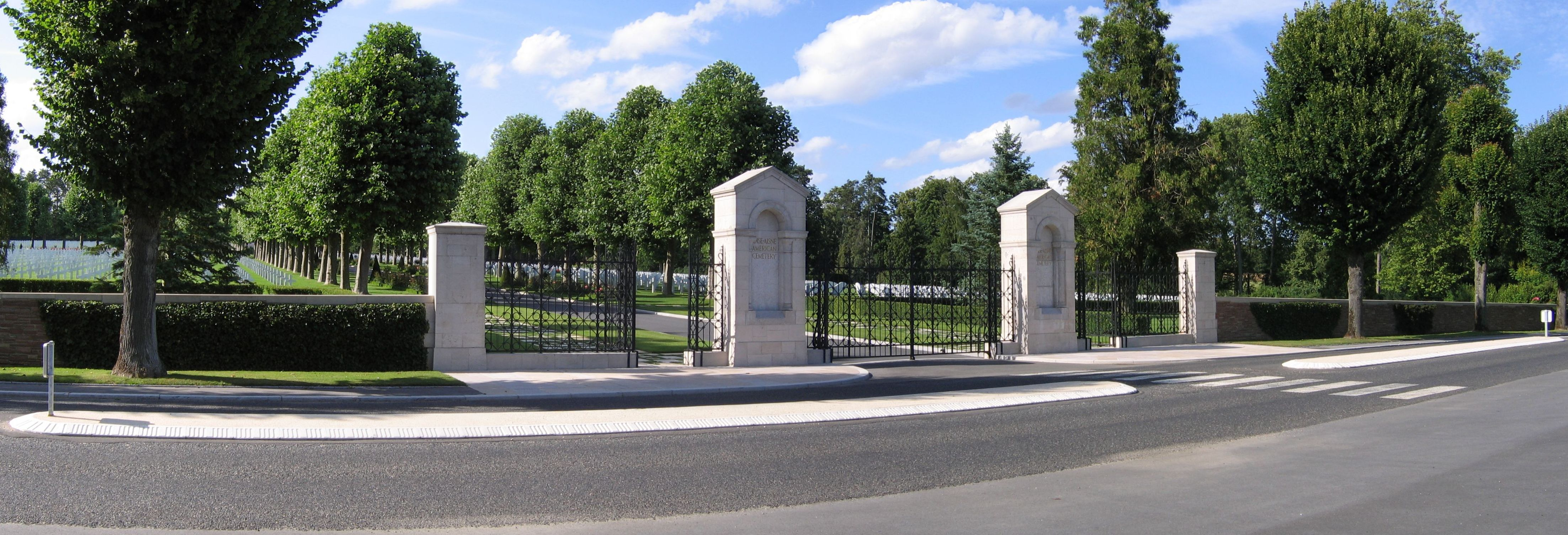
Entrance of Oise-Aisne Cemetery.

== See also ==
- World War I memorials
