= Statue of John Lewis =

Statue of John Lewis may refer to:

- Statue of John Lewis (Atlanta)
- John Lewis Memorial, a statue in Decatur, Georgia
- Steadfast Stride Toward Justice, a statue in Montgomery, Alabama
