= National Windrush Monument =

Memorial in London to the Windrush generation

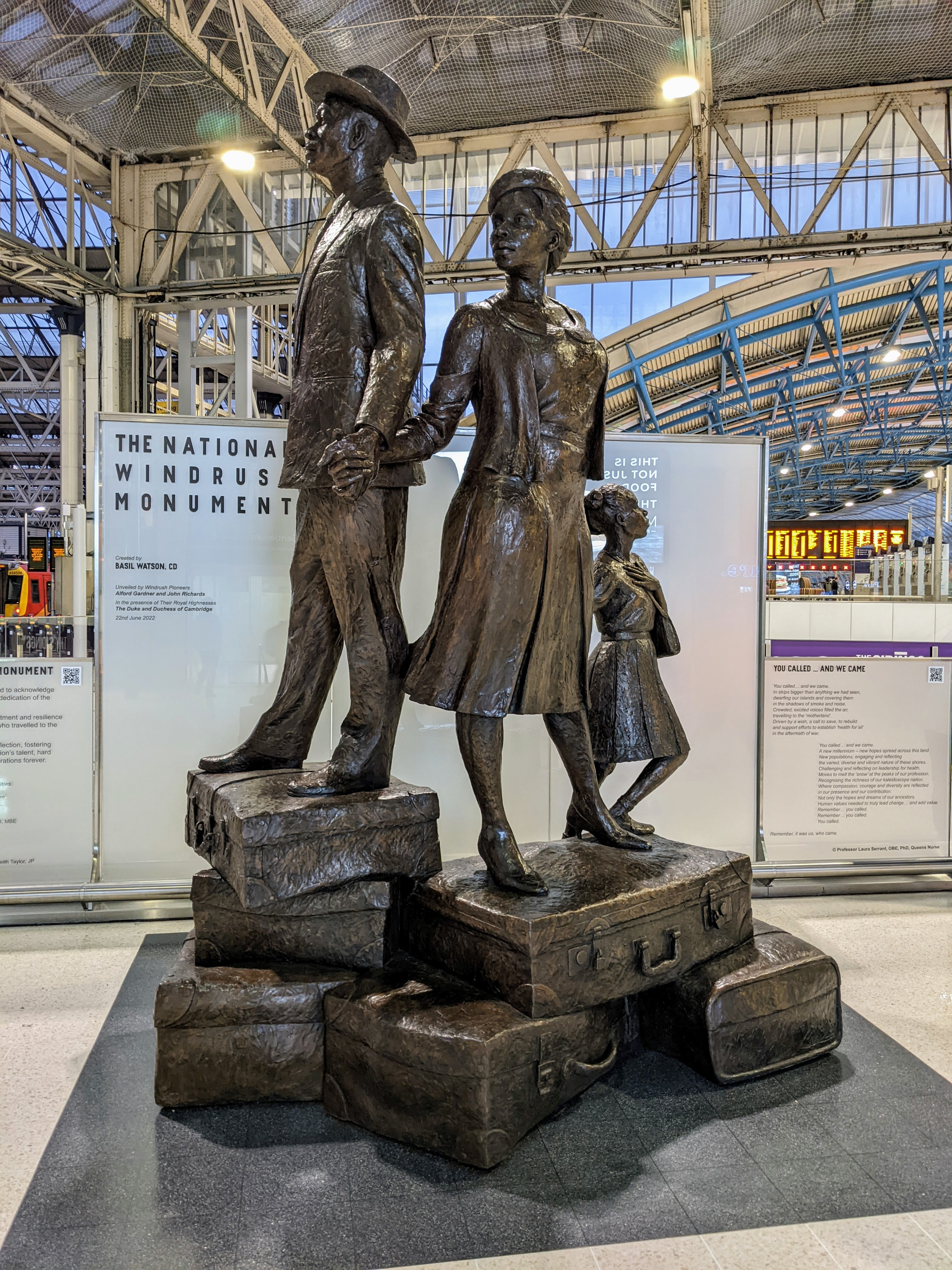
- Location: Waterloo Station, London, England
- Coordinates: 51.5034°N 0.1137°W
- Designer: Basil Watson
- Type: Sculpture
- Material: Bronze
- Opening date: 2022
- Dedicated date: Windrush generation

The National Windrush Monument is a bronze sculpture by Basil Watson in London Waterloo station. The monument commemorates the British African-Caribbean immigrants who came to the United Kingdom on board HMT Empire Windrush in 1948, who were the first arrivals of what subsequently became known as the Windrush generation.

The sculpture features a family of three dressed in their Sunday best, standing upon a pile of suitcases and "surveying their new country". The monument also includes a poem by Laura Serrant titled "You Called ... and We Came".

== Background ==
After World War II, the British government encouraged immigration to fill labour shortages. The British Nationality Act 1948 granted the right to settle in the UK to people living in British colonies. The ship HMT Empire Windrush was in the Caribbean, repatriating airmen who had served in the Royal Air Force during the war. Reduced price fares for the return journey from the Caribbean to the UK were offered and advertised in local newspapers, and many took up the opportunity.

Although the Empire Windrush was not the first ship to arrive in the UK with migrants from the Caribbean, its arrival at Tilbury, Essex, on 22 June 1948 saw extensive media attention. The passenger list showed 1,028 passengers on board, the majority from the Caribbean. These and other migrants became known as the Windrush generation.

== Proposals ==
Plans for a £1 million monument funded by the government were first announced in 2019. A Windrush Commemoration Committee was formed, chaired by Baroness Floella Benjamin.

In July 2021 four proposals for the sculpture were shortlisted, all by artists of Caribbean descent. In addition to Watson's winning design, Thomas J Price proposed a 12-foot (3.7 m) golden bronze statue of a woman. Valda Jackson designed three bronze figures, two adults and a child, scattered on a platform with space for people to sit next to them. Jeannette Ehlers proposed a design featuring figures on stilts, in reference to the Moko Jumbie tradition. Watson's design was announced as the winner in October 2021.

Arthur Torrington of the Windrush Foundation criticised the choice of Waterloo station for the monument, stating there had been a lack of consultation with the Caribbean community and that the location was of little relevance to the Windrush generation, and advocating that it should instead be in Windrush Square, Brixton. The Department for Levelling Up, Housing and Communities responded that the location was relevant to many of the Windrush generation, and that the committee deciding the location included prominent members of the community. Watson also praised the highly visible location at one of the UK's busiest railway stations.

== Unveiling ==
The sculpture was unveiled on 22 June 2022 (Windrush Day) by Prince William, Duke of Cambridge, with Queen Elizabeth also sending a message of support:

The unveiling at Waterloo Station on Windrush Day serves as a fitting thank you to the Windrush pioneers and their descendants, in recognition of the profound contribution they have made to the United Kingdom over the decades.

On the same day a different sculpture titled Warm Shores by Thomas J. Price was also unveiled outside Hackney Town Hall.

== See also ==
- Custard Apple (Annonaceae), Breadfruit (Moraceae) and Soursop (Annonaceae) – The first permanent monument to the Windrush generation, unveiled in Hackney, London, in October 2021
- Windrush scandal – A 2018 political scandal concerning members of the Windrush generation who were wrongly deported or threatened with deportation
