= John Lewis Memorial =

Monument in Decatur, Georgia, United States

- Interactive map of John Lewis Memorial
- Location: DeKalb County Courthouse, Decatur, Georgia, United States
- Coordinates: 33°46′29.5″N 84°17′47.5″W
- Designer: Basil Watson
- Type: Statue
- Material: Bronze (statue); Granite (pedestal)
- Height: Statue: 12 feet (3.7 m); Pedestal: 4 feet (1.2 m)
- Dedicated date: August 24, 2024
- Dedicated to: John Lewis

The John Lewis Memorial (also known as Congressman John Lewis or Empathy) is a monument on the grounds of the DeKalb County Courthouse in Decatur, Georgia, United States. The monument was designed by sculptor Basil Watson and consists of a bronze statue of civil rights activist and politician John Lewis atop a granite pedestal. It was dedicated in 2024 and stands in the former location of the DeKalb County Confederate Monument, which had been removed in 2020.

== Design ==
The monument consists of a bronze statue of John Lewis atop a granite pedestal. The statue is 12 feet (3.7 meters) tall, while the pedestal has a height of 4 ft (1.2 m). (Note: While multiple sources give the pedestal's height as four feet, one source mentions that it is 6 ft (1.8 m).) Lewis is standing and has his hands placed over his heart. He is facing upwards, with his eyes closed.

== History ==
=== Background and creation ===
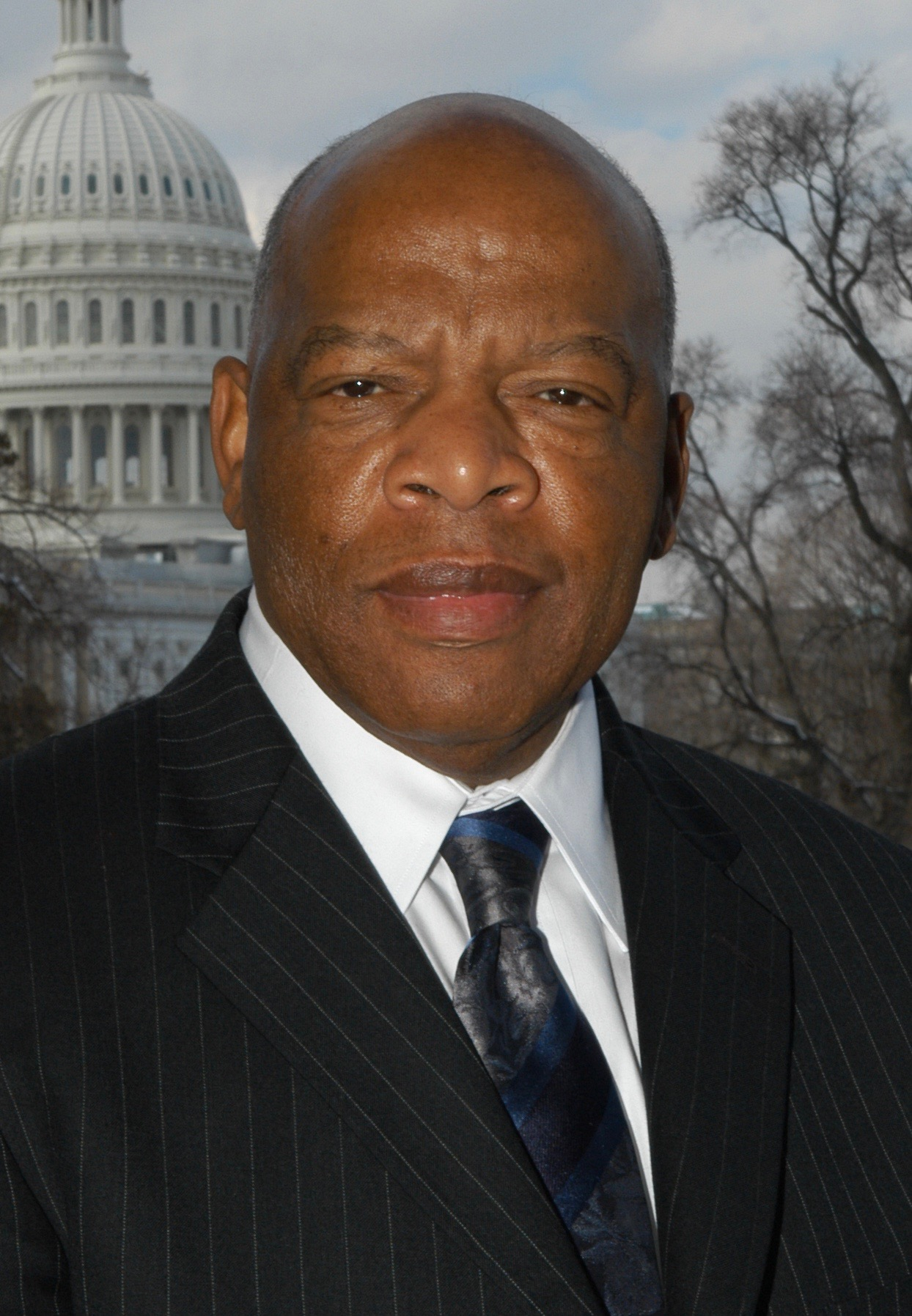
John Lewis in 2006

John Lewis was an American politician and civil rights activist. In the 1960s, he served as a chairman of the Student Nonviolent Coordinating Committee and participated in several major events of the civil rights movement, including the Freedom Riders project, the March on Washington, and the Selma to Montgomery marches. As a politician, Lewis, a member of the Democratic Party, served in the United States House of Representatives, representing Georgia's 5th congressional district from 1987 until 2020. In 2011, President Barack Obama awarded him the Presidential Medal of Freedom. He died in July 2020.

Following his death, attorney and politician Burrell Ellis of DeKalb County, Georgia—located within Lewis's former congressional district—worked to create a 27-member task force, co-chaired by Ellis and Mayor Patti Garrett of Decatur, Georgia, to create a memorial in his honor. On January 26, 2021, the county commission for DeKalb County voted in favor of erecting a statue of Lewis in Decatur Square, on the grounds of the county courthouse. It would be erected on the spot of the DeKalb County Confederate Monument, which had been removed in June 2020. There had been efforts to remove the monument for several years, with multiple protests and acts of vandalism, prompting a local judge to order its removal. In June 2021, the state chapter of the Sons of Confederate Veterans attempted to have the monument re-erected at the site, though this did not come to fruition. By 2024, the area, known as Decatur Square, had become a public plaza surrounded by several restaurants and shops.

The county government solicited designs from sculptors, and in December 2022, the task force announced that sculptor Basil Watson had won the commission. Watson was based in Metro Atlanta, operating a studio in Lawrenceville, Georgia, and had designed several other works of public art in the area, including Hope Moving Forward, a statue of Martin Luther King Jr. near Mercedes-Benz Stadium. Watson, who had previously met Lewis in 2005, said that he had been an admirer of his and had created a portrait of the man prior to his selection as the monument's designer.

In late 2022, the task force said that they planned to have the monument erected by 2024. It would be one of several memorials for Lewis in Metro Atlanta, including a statue of Lewis that was unveiled in Atlanta's Rodney Cook Sr. Park in 2021. In total, the task force raised approximately $700,000 (equivalent to $718,000 in 2025) for the project.

=== Dedication ===
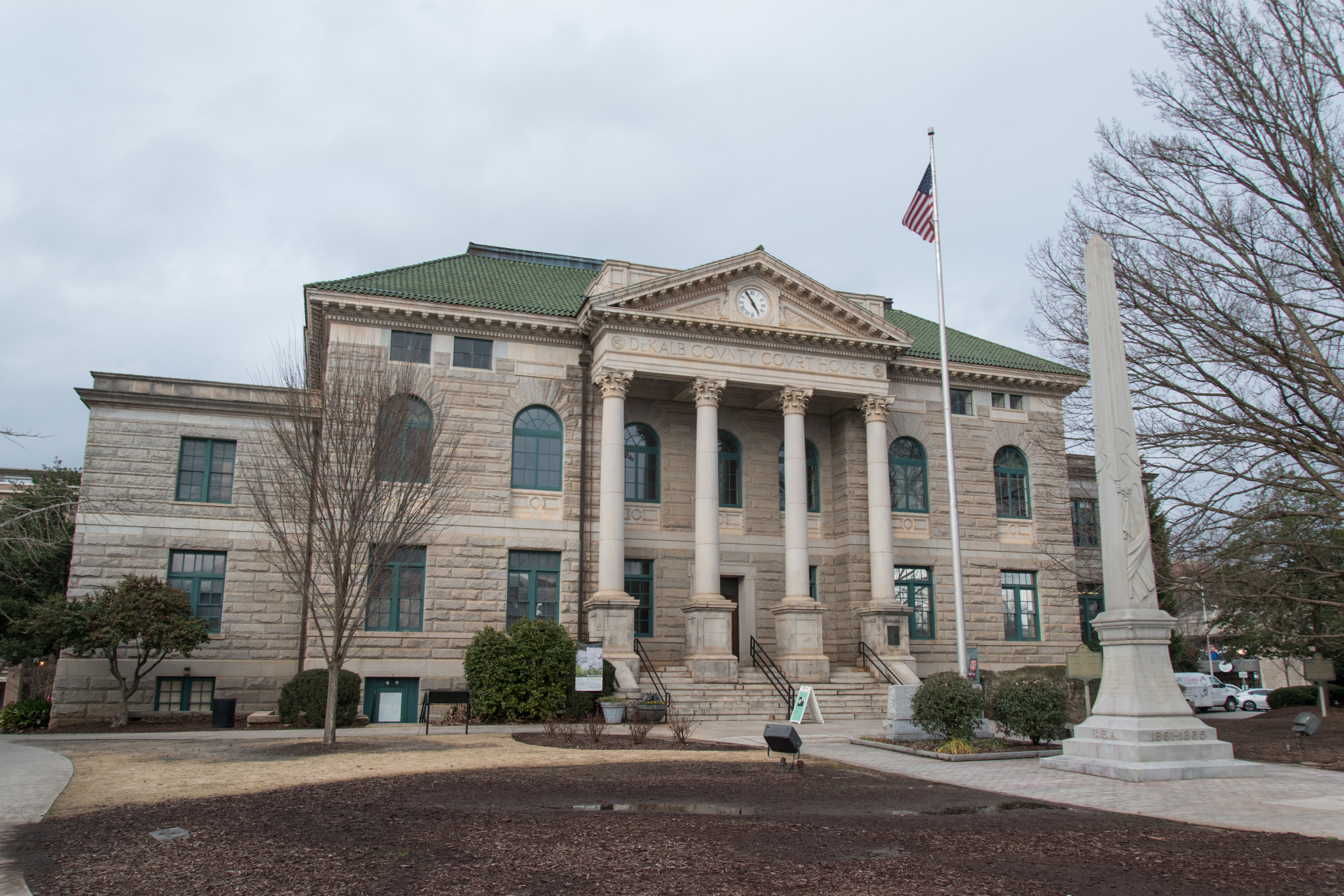
The statue was erected in front of the county courthouse, on the former site of the DeKalb County Confederate Monument (pictured 2019).

The monument, variously known as the John Lewis Memorial, Empathy, and Congressman John Lewis, was installed outside of the courthouse on August 16, 2024. It was dedicated several days later on August 24, with an unveiling ceremony that began at 11 a.m. The event attracted several hundred spectators, including several of Lewis's relatives. Radio personality Rashad Richey served as the master of ceremonies, while actress Jennifer Holliday led the crowd in singing "The Star-Spangled Banner" and "Lift Every Voice and Sing". The Reverend Doctor Jamal Harrison Bryant performed an invocation at the ceremony.

Several politicians participated in the event, with comments given by former United Nations ambassador Andrew Young, United States senator Raphael Warnock, representatives Sanford Bishop and Nikema Williams, DeKalb County chief executive officer Michael Thurmond, DeKalb County commissioner Davis Johnson, and Mayor Garrett. Additional statements were given by civil rights activist Xernona Clayton and Michael Collins, who had served as Lewis's chief of staff.

== See also ==
- 2024 in art
- Civil rights movement in popular culture
- Steadfast Stride Toward Justice - Another statue of Lewis designed by Watson, in Montgomery, Alabama
