= The Legacy Museum =

History museum in Montgomery, Alabama, US

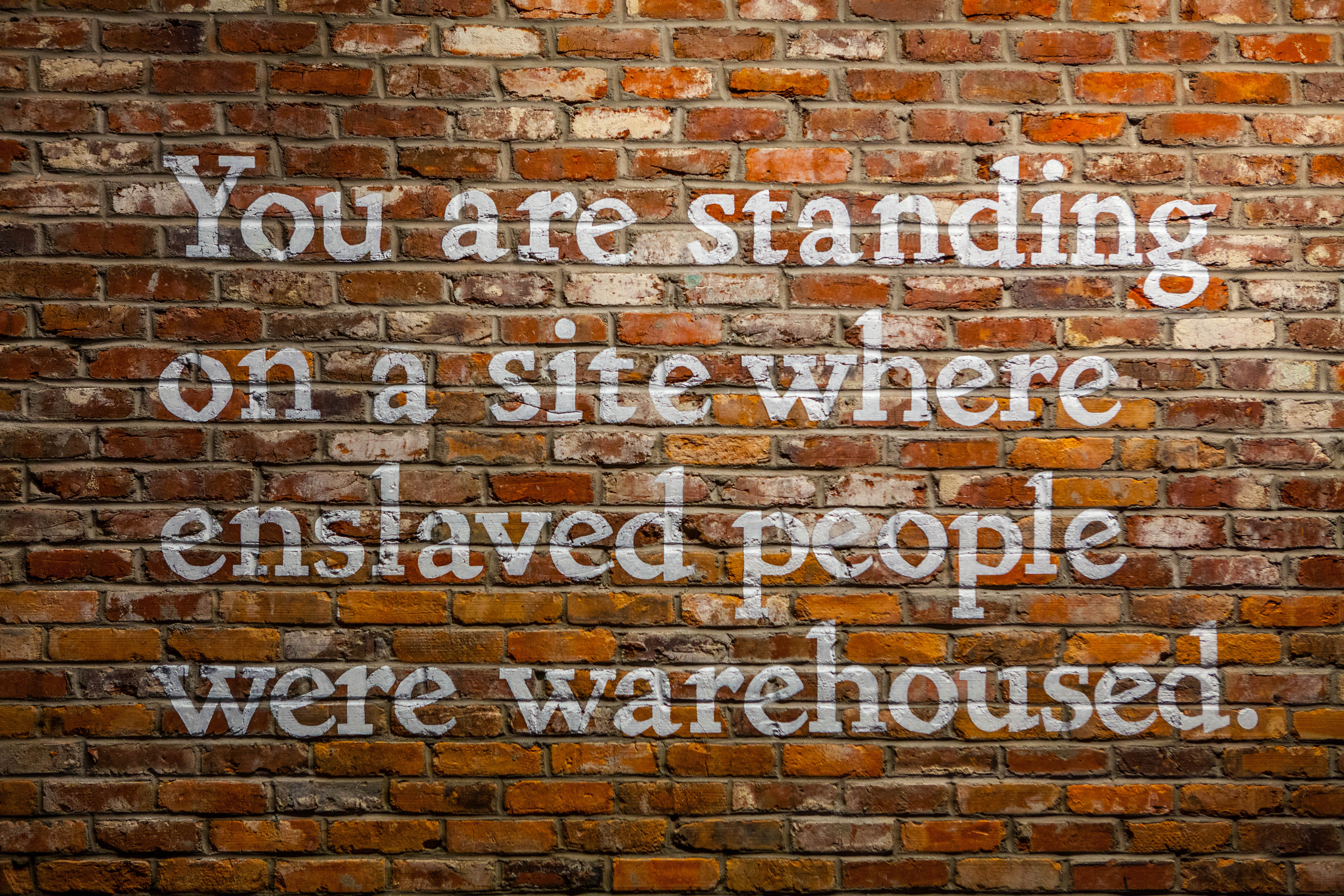
- Established: April 26, 2018; 8 years ago
- Location: Montgomery, Alabama
- Coordinates: 32°22′47″N 86°18′37″W
- Founder: Equal Justice Initiative
- Website: legacysites.eji.org/about/museum/

The Legacy Museum: From Enslavement to Mass Incarceration is a museum in Montgomery, Alabama, that displays the history of slavery and racism in America. This includes the enslavement of African-Americans, racial lynchings, segregation, and racial bias.

== Development ==
The museum, which opened on April 26, 2018, is founded by Montgomery's Equal Justice Initiative (EJI), a non-profit organization founded by Bryan Stevenson to assist in providing legal representation to inmates on death row. The Museum, which receives no public funding, was founded as a counterpart to the National Memorial to Peace and Justice, which is dedicated specifically to the memory of the victims of lynching. The development and construction of the museum and the nearby memorial cost an estimated $20 million raised from private donations and charitable foundations. To celebrate the opening of the Legacy Museum: From Enslavement to Mass Incarceration and the National Memorial for Peace and Justice, the Equal Justice Initiative held an opening ceremony and two-day Summit. The Summit included speakers such as Sherrilyn Ifill the Director Counsel of the NAACP Legal Defense Fund, Anthony Ray Hinton, who spent 30 years as a death row prisoner until he was represented by the EJI and proven innocent in his case, and Former Vice-President Al Gore who discussed Climate Change and Environmental Justice. The Summit included a multitude of speakers as well as those previously mentioned.

On October 1, 2021, the EJI reopened the Legacy Museum as an expansion from the original location at 400 N. Court St. in Montgomery, Alabama. The new grounds of the Legacy Museum is a location where previously enslaved people were warehoused. In order to make the museum and the memorial more accessible, the EJI financially reduced admissions pricing to a single $5.00 ticket to visit both locations. The new expansion of the Legacy Museum is roughly five times the size of the original location. The original location was at capacity about 80% of the time before the pandemic and was expected to repeat those numbers the following summer. About 50,000 people came to the memorial and were unable to visit the Museum due to the former location being at capacity. Following the Legacy Museums move, in late March 2022, the EJI opened another Legacy Site called the Freedom Monument Sculpture Park, a 17-acre park that includes art pieces and original artifacts along the Alabama River where millions of enslaved people were trafficked.

== Exhibits ==
The Museum was originally housed in an 11,000-square-foot (1,000 m^{2}) museum include oral history, archival materials, and interactive technology. Then, in 2021, the museum expanded to the new location in a 47,000-square-foot (4,400 m^{2}) building. The new expansion includes immersive modern technology, historical research, and world-class art that exhibits slavery and its modern influence. The expansion offers a deeper story of American history through displays, artwork, and interactive elements. The sections throughout the museum include slavery, reconstruction, lynching and terror, Jim Crow, segregation and the Civil Rights Era, injustice in the judicial system and mass incarceration.

The museum's goal is to lead the visitor on the path from slavery to racial oppression in other forms, including terror lynching and mass incarceration of minorities. The museum employs technology to dramatize the horror and terror of enslavement, lynchings, and legalized racial segregation in America. Visitors can hear, see, and be near slave replicas, which model what it was like to be an enslaved person awaiting sale at the auction block. There are first person accounts of slavery and auctioning through narration and voiceovers. One of its displays is a collection of soil from lynching sites across the United States. The museum includes a variety of interactive exhibits, including a poll site that includes the test black Americans were expected to pass prior to voting, including questions such as the number of jelly beans in a jar, and a visitors wing to a prison where visitors can sit down and hear the inmates stories.

To illustrate the point of ongoing oppression, the exhibits include photographs of African-Americans picking cotton; the photos could be easily mistaken as depicting the slavery period. They are inmates from the1960s. Unlike the Mississippi Civil Rights Museum, the Legacy Museum does not tell a comforting story of progress from oppression to civil rights reform but of continually evolving ways of controlling Black people. In one telling exhibit, a panicked group of captured and chained Africans stand opposite a group of men, arms raised, at the moment of arrest.

The final room of the museum, before the art exhibit, is a massive room filled with images and music of the individuals who worked to challenge racial injustices. The art gallery includes works by Hank Willis Thomas, Glenn Ligon, Jacob Lawrence, Elizabeth Catlett, Titus Kaphar, and Sanford Biggers. EJI founder Bryan Stevenson said in a statement announcing the museum's opening. "We're proud that the Legacy Museum can play a vital role in helping people learn American history that's often not taught and empower everyone to build healthier communities."

== See also ==
- List of museums focused on African Americans
- Steadfast Stride Toward Justice - A statue of John Lewis installed near the museum
- Topography of Terror: museum in Berlin, Germany dedicated to the victims of the Nazi regime
