= Statue of Thomas Jefferson (Decatur, Georgia) =

- Thomas Jefferson statue (2012)
- Medium: Bronze
- Subject: Thomas Jefferson
- Location: Decatur, Georgia, United States; 33°46′32″N 84°17′48″W

The Thomas Jefferson statue is a bronze statue of Thomas Jefferson which was formerly located on a bench next to the Old DeKalb County Courthouse in Decatur, Georgia.

== Description ==
The statue depicts Jefferson writing the United States Declaration of Independence and was donated to the city by a private citizen to honor U.S. senator Paul Coverdell, who died in 2000.

Following a rally during the George Floyd protests on June 17, 2020, it was announced that the statue would be removed, citing the fact that Jefferson was a slave-owner who owned over 600 slaves and fathered several children with Sally Hemings, his sister-in-law and a slave he owned. On the morning of June 19, 2020 the statue was removed at the request of the donor "to protect it from damage." This came several days after the removal of the DeKalb County Confederate Monument, an obelisk on the courthouse grounds that honored the Lost Cause of the Confederacy.

== See also ==
- List of statues of Thomas Jefferson
- List of monuments and memorials removed during the George Floyd protests
