= Valda Jackson =

Jamaican artist (born c.1959)

Valda Harris MBE (née Jackson; born c. 1959) is a Jamaican-British painter, sculptor and writer.

== Life ==
Valda Jackson was born in Saint Thomas Parish, Jamaica. In 1964, aged five, she moved to England with her two sisters to join her parents. The family lived near Birmingham. At school in the 1960s and 1970s, she experienced racism from teachers and pupils. She only studied art after leaving school, attending evening classes at Birmingham's Bournville College of Art to gain A-Levels in art and art history. In 1986 she moved to Bristol to study at Bower Ashton College of Art and Design, where she was the only Black student studying fine art in her year. She has continued to live in Bristol.

Jackson is a member of the Royal Society of Sculptors, and has exhibited throughout the United Kingdom. Her first exhibition was at Bristol's Malcolm X Centre. In 1992 and 1993 she was a prize-winner at the Millfield Open Show, and she has also exhibited work at the National Portrait Gallery. Her public art sculptures include Mare and Foal (1995), a life-size carving in Newmarket, and a 2000 sculpture of a steam engine at Station Approach in Newport City Centre. In 2002 she created a relief artwork, All Our Tomorrows, for the new Family and Learning Centre in St Pauls.

She has a studio at Spike Island Artspace. In 2016 she and other writers collaborated with scientists from Bristol University in Literary Archaeology, a project to re-imagine the lives of enslaved people using the material evidence of their skeletal remains.

Her public art collaborations with the sculptor and printmaker Rodney Harris include four brick relief artworks for the Peabody estate in St. John Hill's, Clapham, which won the Public Monuments and Sculpture Association Marsh Award special prize for Excellence in Public Sculpture.

Jackson has worked as a tutor at Cardiff School of Art and Design, and lectured in fine art at the University of Central England. She has also worked with several schools and colleges in South West England.

Jackson was appointed Member of the Order of the British Empire (MBE) in the 2024 New Year Honours for services to art.

=== Windrush monument shortlist ===
In 2021 Jackson was one of the four shortlisted artists to create a new monument to the Windrush generation at Waterloo Station, a commission later won by the sculptor Basil Watson. Jackson's proposal, presented for public consultation in July 2021, was for three scattered bronze figures on a raised platform. Two standing adults and one small child would have symbolised the diverse experiences of migrants to the United Kingdom, with space between the figures to emphasise the ambiguity of separation and migration, as well as inviting onlookers and passersby to pause and sit in that space themselves:

I want to place on a platform the image of those who might feel least appreciated, most of risk of having to answer the question, "Why are you here?" [...] By creating a space, it is a space for all the stories to be imagined [...] this monument is an expression of acknowledgment of belonging.

== Writing ==
- "One Sunday Morning in May 1971". Shortlisted for BBC Radio 4 Opening Lines, 2015.
- "An Age of Reason (Coming Here)", in Jacob Ross, ed. (2015). Closure: Contemporary Black British Short stories. Peepal Tree Press. ISBN 1845232887.
- "How I Feel" (poem), 2016.
