= John Lewis =

American politician and civil rights leader (1940–2020)

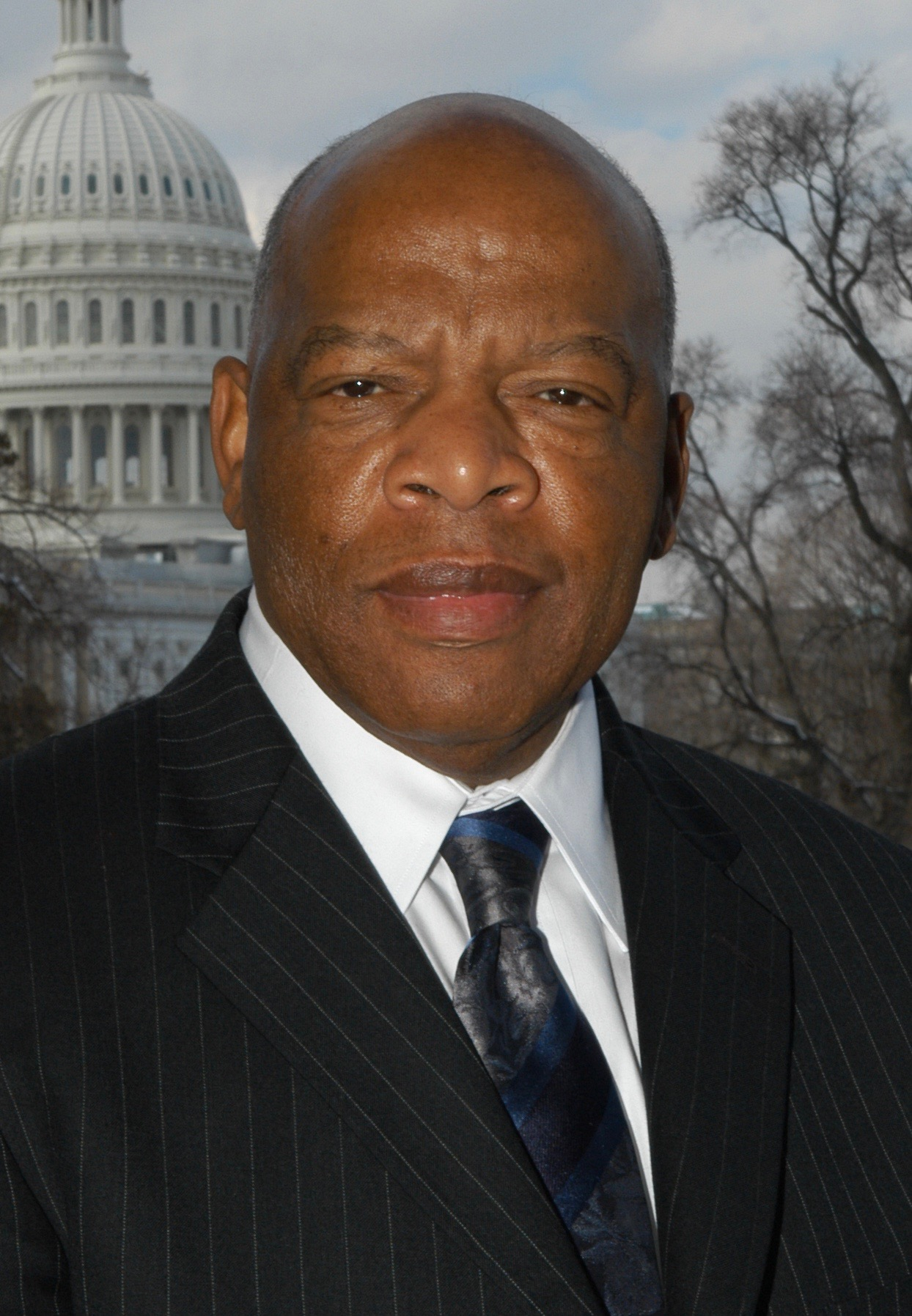
- Official portrait, 2006

House Democratic Senior Chief Deputy Whip
- In office January 3, 2003 – July 17, 2020
- Leader: Dick Gephardt; Nancy Pelosi
- Preceded by: David Bonior (Chief Deputy Whip)
- Succeeded by: G. K. Butterfield

Member of the U.S. House of Representatives from Georgia's 5th district
- In office January 3, 1987 – July 17, 2020
- Preceded by: Wyche Fowler
- Succeeded by: Kwanza Hall

Member of the Atlanta City Council from at-large post 18
- In office January 1, 1982 – September 3, 1985
- Preceded by: Jack Summer
- Succeeded by: Morris Finley

3rd Chairman of the Student Nonviolent Coordinating Committee
- In office June 1963 – May 1966
- Preceded by: Charles McDew
- Succeeded by: Stokely Carmichael

Personal details
- Born: John Robert Lewis; February 21, 1940 Pike County, Alabama, U.S.
- Died: July 17, 2020 (aged 80) Atlanta, Georgia, U.S.
- Resting place: South-View Cemetery
- Party: Democratic
- Spouse: Lillian Miles (m. 1968; died 2012)
- Children: 1
- Education: American Baptist College (BA); Fisk University (BA)
- Occupation: Civil rights activist; Politician
- John Lewis's voice John Lewis speaks on a House resolution celebrating Martin Luther King Jr. Recorded January 21, 2009

John Robert Lewis (February 21, 1940 – July 17, 2020) was an American civil rights activist and statesman who served in the United States House of Representatives for Georgia's 5th congressional district from 1987 until his death in 2020.

He participated in the 1960 Nashville sit-ins and the Freedom Rides, was the chairman of the Student Nonviolent Coordinating Committee (SNCC) from 1963 to 1966, and was one of the "Big Six" leaders of groups who organized the 1963 March on Washington. Lewis played a key role in the civil rights movement and its actions to end legalized racial segregation in the United States. In 1965, Lewis led the first of three Selma to Montgomery marches across the Edmund Pettus Bridge where, in an incident that became known as Bloody Sunday, state troopers and police attacked Lewis and the other marchers.

A member of the Democratic Party, Lewis was first elected to the U.S. House of Representatives in 1986 and served 17 terms. The district he represented included most of Atlanta. Due to his length of service, he became the dean of the Georgia congressional delegation. He was one of the leaders of the Democratic Party in the House, serving from 1991 as a chief deputy whip and from 2003 as a senior chief deputy whip. He received many honorary degrees and awards, including the Presidential Medal of Freedom in 2011.

== Early life and education ==
John Robert Lewis was born near Troy, Alabama, on February 21, 1940, the third of ten children of Willie Mae (née Carter) and Eddie Lewis. His parents were sharecroppers in rural Pike County, Alabama, of which Troy was the county seat. His great-grandfather, Frank Carter, had been born enslaved in the same county in 1862, and lived until Lewis was seven years old.

As a boy, Lewis aspired to be a preacher, and at five years of age, he preached to his family's chickens on the farm. When he was a young child, he had little interaction with white people, since his county was majority black by a large percentage and his family worked as farmers. By the time he was six, Lewis had seen only two white people in his life. Lewis recalled: "I grew up in rural Alabama, very poor, very few books in our home." His early education was at a little school within walking distance of his home; he described it as: "A beautiful little building, it was a Rosenwald School. It was supported by the community, it was the only school we had." "I had a wonderful teacher in elementary school, and she told me 'read my child, read!' And I tried to read everything. I loved books. I remember in 1956, when I was 16 years old, with some of my brothers and sisters and cousins, going down to the public library, trying to get a library card, and we were told the library was for whites only and not for coloreds." As he grew older, Lewis began taking trips into Troy with his family, where he continued to have experiences of racism and segregation. Lewis had relatives who lived in northern cities, and he learned from them that in the North, schools, buses, and businesses were integrated. When Lewis was 11, an uncle took him to Buffalo, New York, where he became acutely aware of the contrast with Troy's segregation.

In 1955, Lewis first heard Martin Luther King Jr. on the radio, and he closely followed King's Montgomery bus boycott later that year. At the age of 15, Lewis preached his first public sermon. At 17, he met Rosa Parks, notable for her role in the bus boycott, and met King for the first time at the age of 18. In later years, Lewis also credited evangelist Billy Graham, a friend of King's, as someone who "helped change me". Lewis also stated that Graham inspired him "to a significant degree" to fulfil his aspirations of becoming a minister.

After writing to King about being denied admission to Troy University in Alabama, Lewis was invited to meet with him. King, who referred to Lewis as "the boy from Troy", discussed suing the university for discrimination, but warned Lewis that doing so could endanger his family in Troy. After discussing it with his parents, Lewis decided instead to proceed with his education at a small, historically black college in Tennessee.

Lewis graduated from the American Baptist Theological Seminary in Nashville, Tennessee, and was ordained as a Baptist minister. He then earned a bachelor's degree in religion and philosophy from Fisk University, also a historically black college. He was a member of Phi Beta Sigma fraternity.

== Student activism and SNCC ==
=== Nashville Student Movement ===
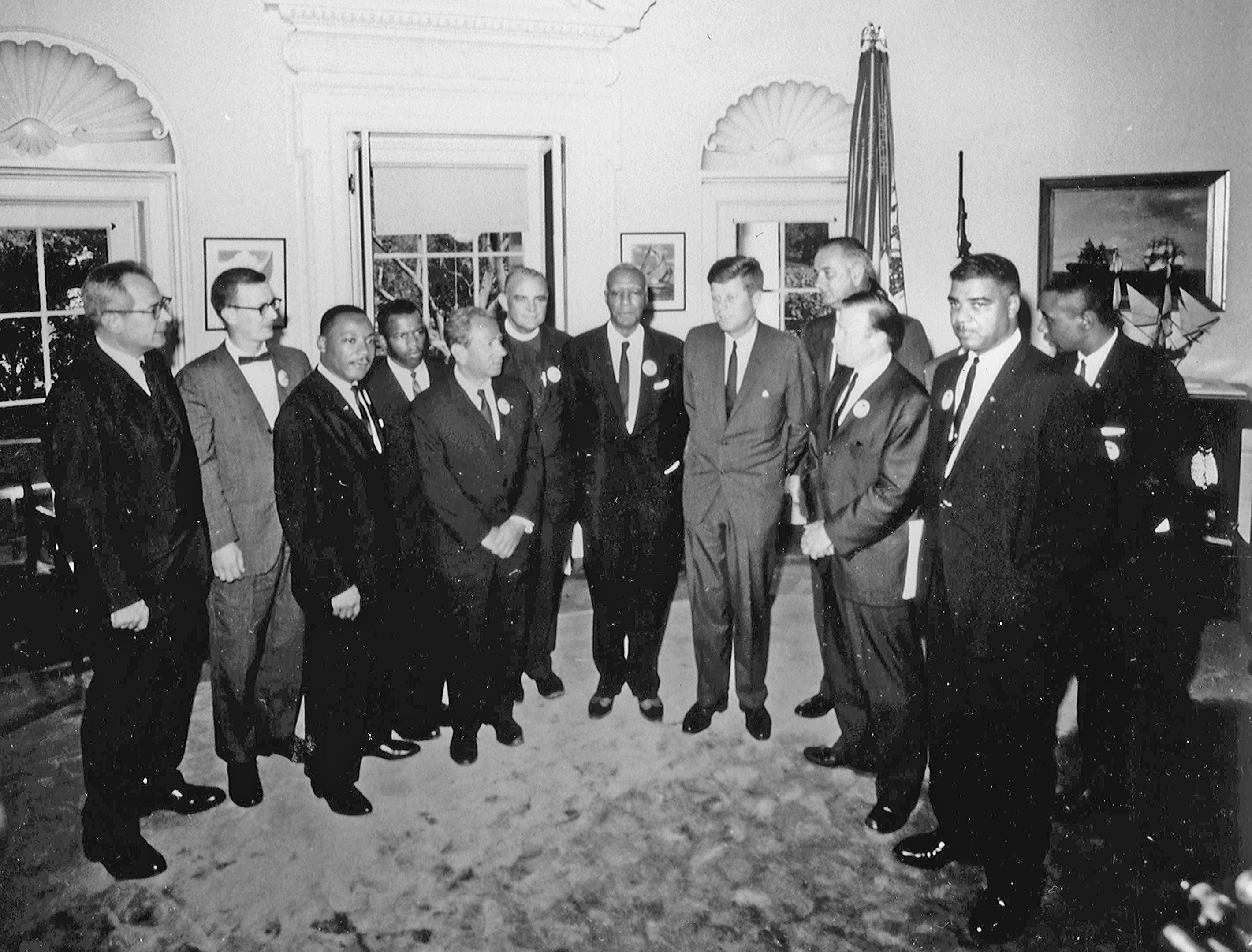
Civil rights leaders meet with President John F. Kennedy and Vice President Lyndon Johnson after the March on Washington for Jobs and Freedom, 1963. Lewis is fourth from left.

As a student, Lewis became an activist in the civil rights movement. He organized sit-ins at segregated lunch counters in Nashville and took part in many other civil rights activities as part of the Nashville Student Movement. The Nashville sit-in movement was responsible for the desegregation of lunch counters in the city's downtown. Lewis was arrested and jailed many times during the nonviolent activities to desegregate the city's downtown businesses. He was also instrumental in organizing bus boycotts and other nonviolent protests to support voting rights and racial equality.

During this time, Lewis said it was important to engage in "good trouble, necessary trouble" in order to achieve change, and he held to this credo throughout his life.

While a student, Lewis was invited to attend nonviolence workshops held at Clark Memorial United Methodist Church by the Rev. James Lawson and Rev. Kelly Miller Smith. Lewis and other students became dedicated to the discipline and philosophy of nonviolence, which he practiced for the rest of his life.

=== Freedom Riders ===
In 1961, Lewis became one of the 13 original Freedom Riders. The group of seven blacks and six whites planned to ride on interstate buses from Washington, D.C. to New Orleans to challenge the policies of Southern states along the route that had imposed segregated seating on the buses, which violated federal policy for interstate transportation. The "Freedom Ride", originated by the Fellowship of Reconciliation and revived by James Farmer and the Congress of Racial Equality (CORE), was initiated to pressure the federal government to enforce the Supreme Court decision in Boynton v. Virginia (1960), which declared segregated interstate bus travel to be unconstitutional. The Freedom Rides revealed the passivity of the local, state, and federal governments in the face of violence against law-abiding citizens. The project was publicized and organizers had notified the Department of Justice about it. It relied upon the Alabama police to protect the riders, even though the state was known for notorious racism, and did not undertake actions except assigning FBI agents to record incidents. After extreme violence broke out in South Carolina and Alabama, the Kennedy Administration called for a "cooling-off" period, with a moratorium on Freedom Rides.

In the South, Lewis and other nonviolent Freedom Riders were beaten by angry mobs and arrested. At age 21, Lewis was the first of the Freedom Riders to be assaulted while in Rock Hill, South Carolina. When he tried to enter a whites-only waiting room, two white men attacked him, injuring his face and kicking him in the ribs. Two weeks later Lewis joined a Freedom Ride bound for Jackson, Mississippi. Near the end of his life, Lewis said of this time, "We were determined not to let any act of violence keep us from our goal. We knew our lives could be threatened, but we had made up our minds not to turn back." As a result of his Freedom Rider activities, Lewis was imprisoned for 40 days in the notorious Mississippi State Penitentiary in Sunflower County.

In an interview with CNN during the 40th anniversary of the Freedom Rides, Lewis recounted the violence he and the 12 other original Freedom Riders endured. In Birmingham, the Riders were beaten by an unrestrained mob including KKK members (notified of their arrival by police) with baseball bats, chains, lead pipes, and stones. The police arrested them, and led them across the border into Tennessee before letting them go. The Riders reorganized and rode to Montgomery, where they were met with more violence at the local Greyhound station. There Lewis was hit in the head with a wooden crate. "It was very violent. I thought I was going to die. I was left lying at the Greyhound bus station in Montgomery unconscious", said Lewis, remembering the incident.

When CORE gave up on the Freedom Ride because of the violence, Lewis and fellow activist Diane Nash arranged for Nashville students from Fisk and other colleges to take it over and bring it to a successful conclusion.

In February 2009, 48 years after the Montgomery attack, Lewis received a nationally televised apology from Elwin Wilson, a white southerner and former Klansman.

Lewis wrote in 2015 that he had known the young activists Michael Schwerner and Andrew Goodman from New York. They, along with James Chaney, a local African-American activist from Mississippi, were abducted and murdered in June 1964 in Neshoba County, Mississippi, by members of the Ku Klux Klan including law enforcement.

=== SNCC Chairman ===
External videos
- "Interview with John Lewis" pt.1 conducted in 1979 for America, They Loved You Madly, a precursor to Eyes on the Prize in which he discusses the sit-ins in Nashville, the philosophy of non-violence, the Freedom Rides, his role in SNCC, and the March on Washington.

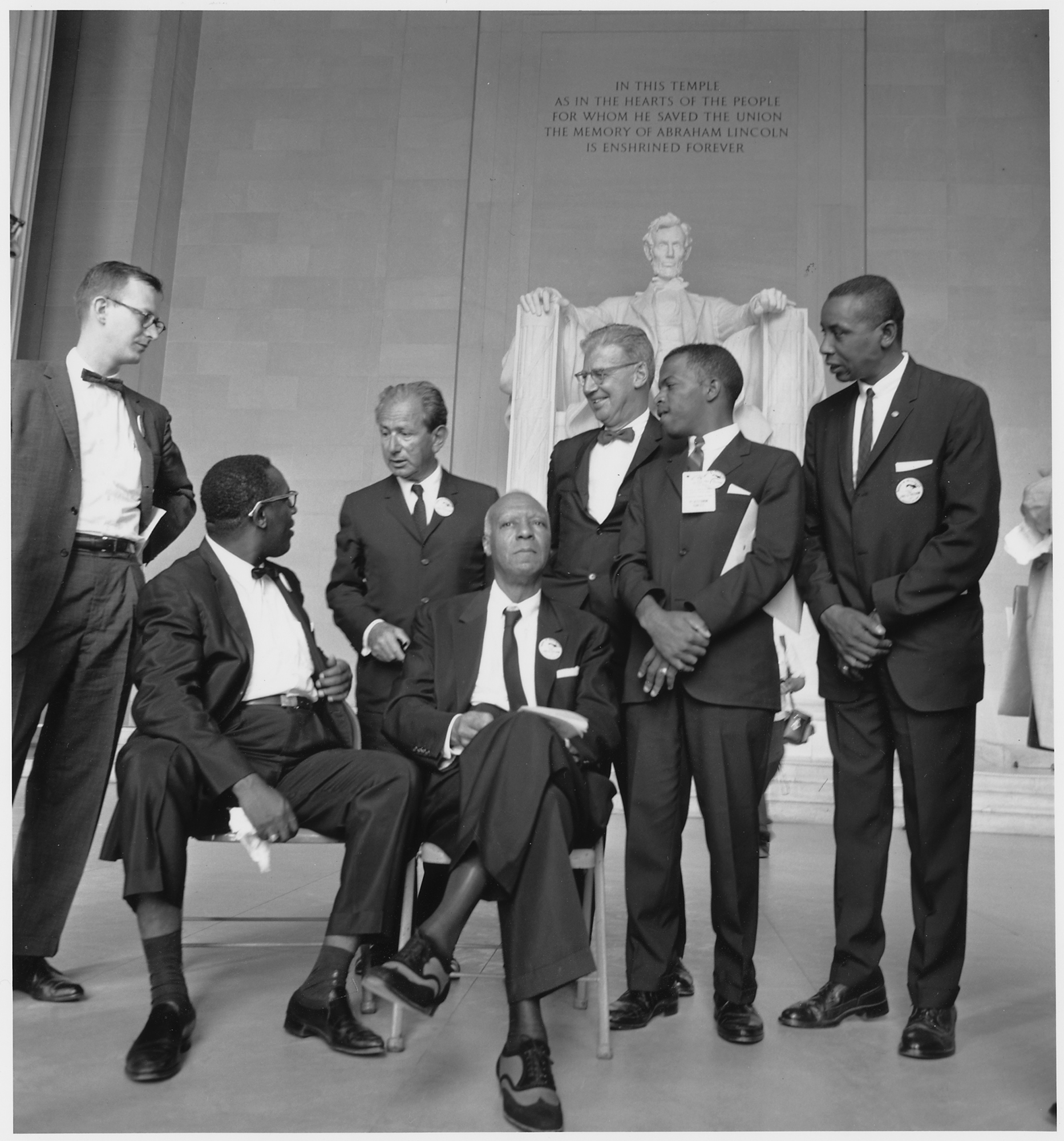
Leaders of the March on Washington, 1963. Lewis is second from right.

In 1963, when Charles McDew stepped down as chairman of the Student Nonviolent Coordinating Committee (SNCC), Lewis, a founding member, was elected to take over. Lewis's experience was already widely respected. His courage and tenacious adherence to the philosophy of reconciliation and nonviolence had enabled him to emerge as a leader. He had already been arrested 24 times in the nonviolent movement for equal justice. Lewis was the youngest of the "Big Six" leaders who were organizing the March on Washington that summer. He was the fourth of 12 speakers on the program that day, which ended with Dr. Martin Luther King Jr.'s now-famous "I Have a Dream" speech. A. Philip Randolph preceded Lewis. James Farmer, Whitney Young, and Roy Wilkins spoke between Lewis and King.

Lewis had written a response to Kennedy's 1963 Civil Rights Bill. Lewis and his fellow SNCC workers had suffered from the federal government's passivity in the face of Southern violence. He planned to denounce Kennedy's bill for failing to provide protection for African Americans against police brutality, or to provide African Americans with the means to vote; he described the bill as "too little and too late". Advance copies of the speech were distributed on August 27 but encountered opposition from the other chairs of the march who demanded revisions. James Forman rapidly re-wrote the speech, replacing Lewis's initial assertion "we cannot support, wholeheartedly the [Kennedy] civil rights bill" with "We support it with great reservations."

Although Lewis's speech remains best remembered for the censorship it faced, it represented the most prominent sustained criticism of police violence in the civil rights movement up to that time. "We are tired of being beat by policemen," Lewis announced to the crowd, adding that Kennedy's bill did "nothing to protect the young children and old women who must face police dogs and fire hoses in the South," a declaration that drew enthusiastic cheers from the audience, the first of more than twelve times that applause forced Lewis to pause his speech.

After Lewis, Dr. King gave his now celebrated "I Have a Dream" speech. Historian Howard Zinn later wrote of this occasion:

At the great Washington March of 1963, the chairman of the Student Nonviolent Coordinating Committee (SNCC), John Lewis, speaking to the same enormous crowd that [next] heard King's "I Have a Dream" speech, was prepared to ask the right question: 'Which side is the federal government on?' That sentence was eliminated from his speech by the other organizers of the March to avoid offending the Kennedy Administration.

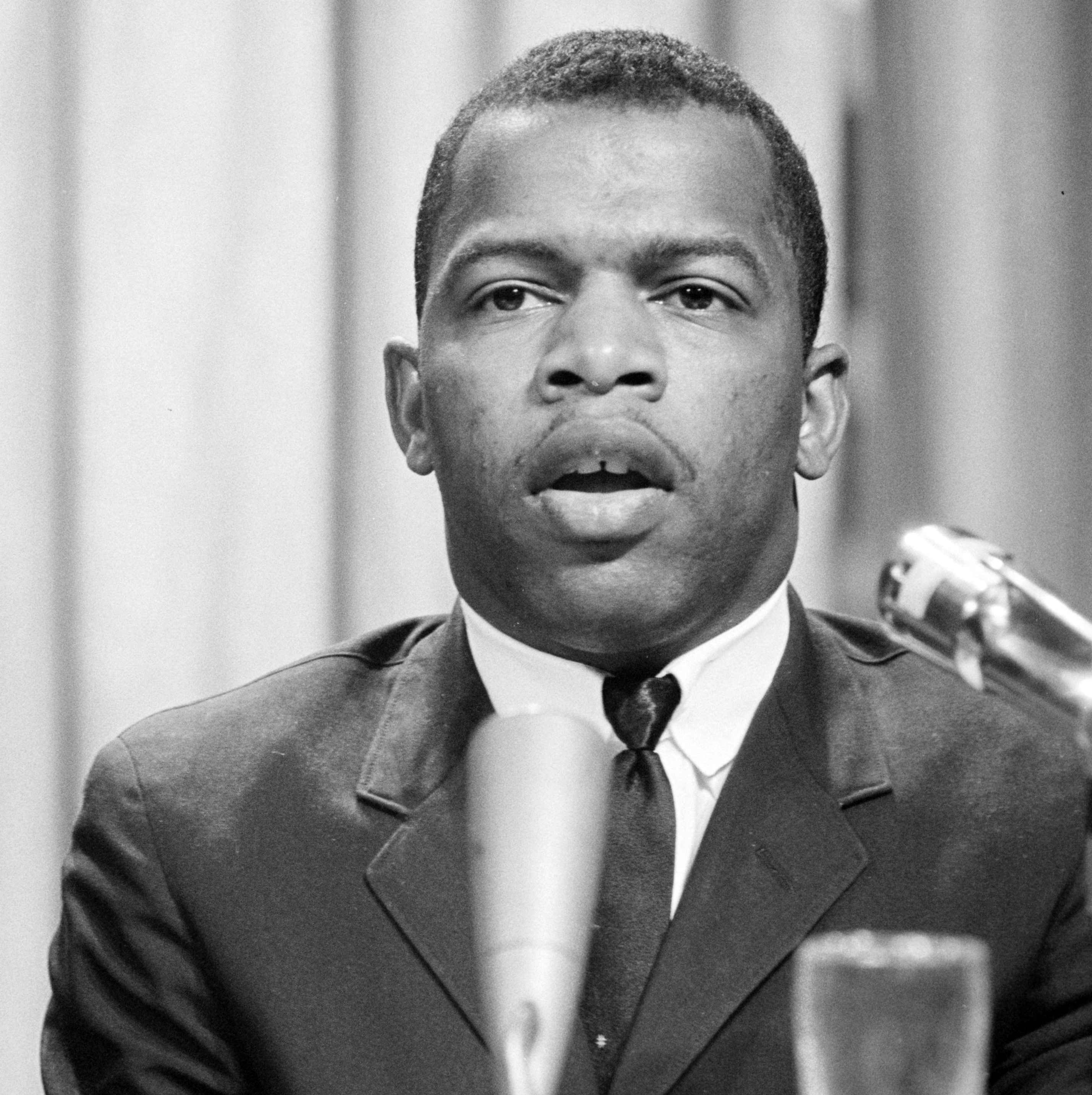
Lewis in 1964

In 1964, SNCC opened Freedom Schools, launched the Mississippi Freedom Summer for voter education and registration. Lewis coordinated SNCC's efforts for Freedom Summer, a campaign to register black voters in Mississippi and to engage college student activists in aiding the campaign. Lewis traveled the country, encouraging students to spend their summer break trying to help people vote in Mississippi, which had the lowest number of black voters and strong resistance to the movement.

In 1965 Lewis organized some of the voter registration efforts during the 1965 Selma voting rights campaign, and became nationally known during his prominent role in the Selma to Montgomery marches. On March 7, 1965 – a day that would become known as "Bloody Sunday" – Lewis and fellow activist Hosea Williams led over 600 marchers across the Edmund Pettus Bridge in Selma, Alabama. At the end of the bridge and the city-county boundary, they were met by Alabama State Troopers who ordered them to disperse. When the marchers stopped to pray, the police discharged tear gas and mounted troopers charged the demonstrators, beating them with nightsticks. Lewis's skull was fractured, but he was aided in escaping across the bridge to Brown Chapel, a church in Selma that served as the movement's headquarters. Lewis bore scars on his head from this incident for the rest of his life.

Lewis served as SNCC chairman until 1966, when he was replaced by Stokely Carmichael.

== Field Foundation, SRC, and VEP (1966–1977) ==
In 1966, Lewis moved to New York City to take a job as the associate director of the Field Foundation of New York. He was there a little over a year before moving back to Atlanta to direct the Southern Regional Council's Community Organization Project. During his time with the Field Foundation, he completed his degree from Fisk University.

In 1970, Lewis became the director of the Voter Education Project (VEP), a position he held until 1977. Though initially a project of the Southern Regional Council, the VEP became an independent organization in 1971. Despite difficulties caused by the 1973–1975 recession, the VEP added nearly four million minority voters to the rolls under Lewis's leadership. During his tenure, the VEP expanded its mission, including running Voter Mobilization Tours.

== Early work in government (1977–1986) ==
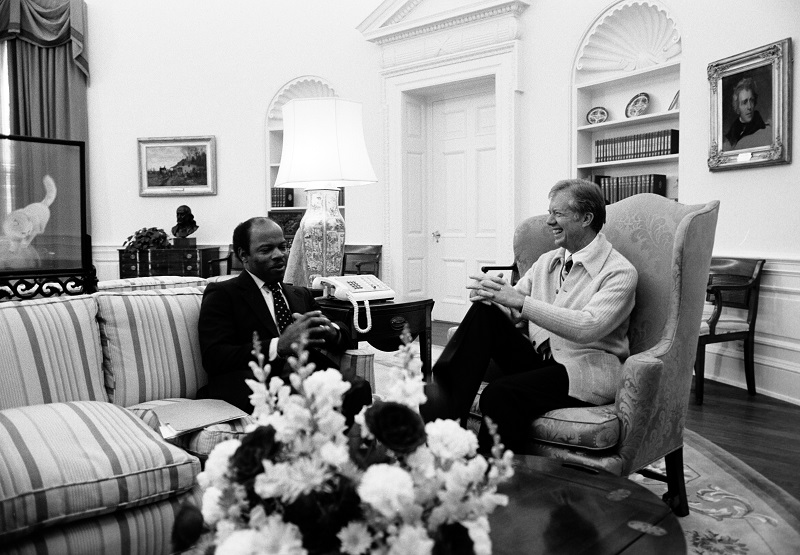
Lewis with President Jimmy Carter in 1979

In January 1977, incumbent Democratic U.S. Congressman Andrew Young of Georgia's 5th congressional district resigned to become the U.S. Ambassador to the U.N. under President Jimmy Carter. In the March 1977 open primary, Atlanta City Councilman Wyche Fowler ranked first with 40% of the vote, failing to reach the 50% threshold to win outright. Lewis ranked second with 29% of the vote. In the April election, Fowler defeated Lewis 62%–38%.

After his unsuccessful bid, Lewis accepted a position with the Carter administration as associate director of ACTION, responsible for running the VISTA program, the Retired Senior Volunteer Program, and the Foster Grandparent Program. He held that job for two and a half years, resigning as the 1980 election approached.

In 1981, Lewis ran for an at-large seat on the Atlanta City Council. He won with 69% of the vote, and served on the council until 1986.

== U.S. House of Representatives ==
=== Elections ===
==== 1986 ====
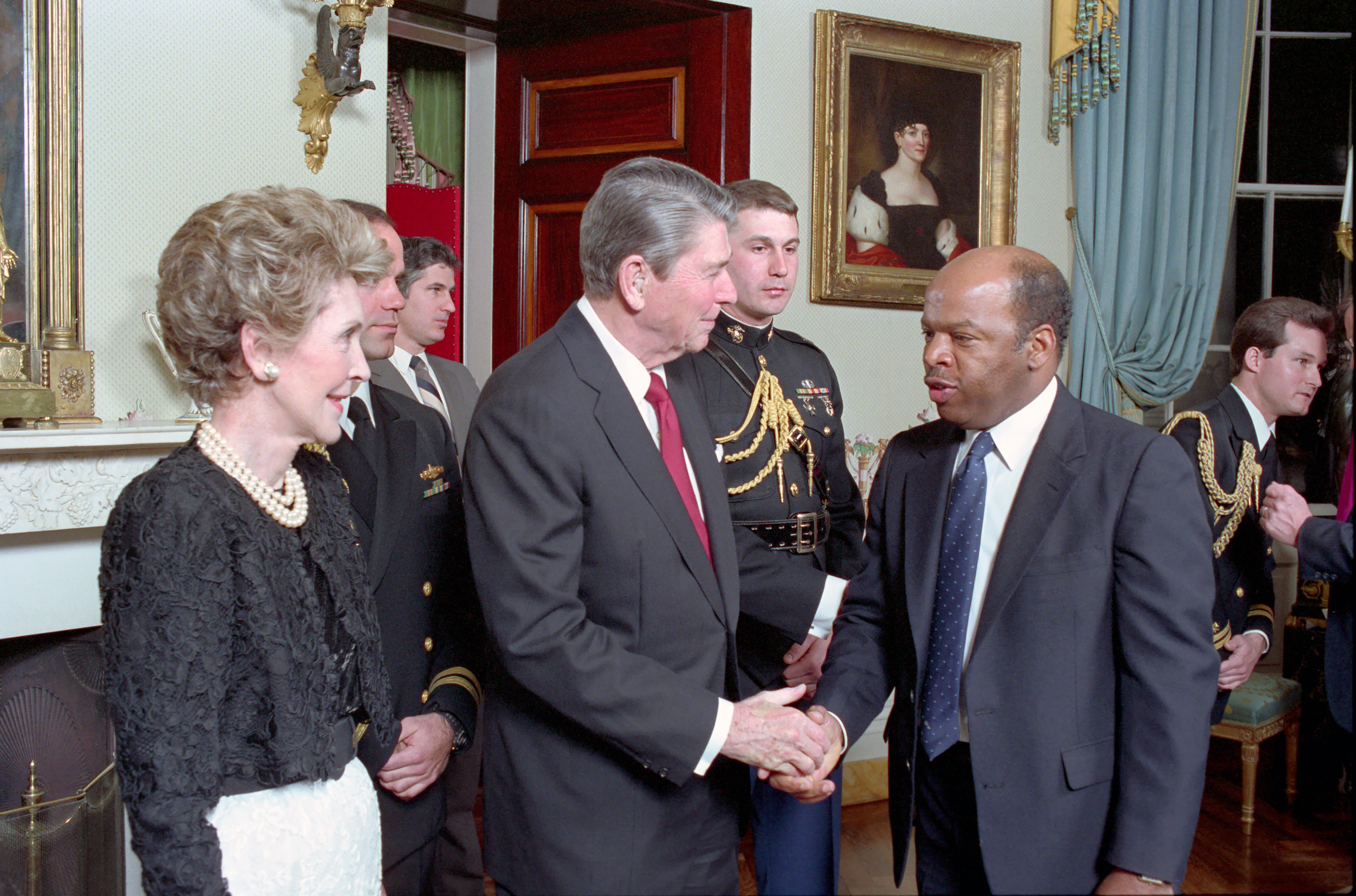
Lewis greets President Ronald Reagan and First Lady Nancy Reagan in 1987

After nine years as a member of the U.S. House of Representatives, Wyche Fowler gave up the seat to make a successful run for the U.S. Senate. Lewis decided to run for the 5th district again. In the August Democratic primary, where a victory was considered tantamount to election, State Senator Julian Bond ranked first with 47%, just three points shy of winning outright. Lewis finished in second place with 35%. In the run-off, Lewis pulled an upset against Bond, defeating him 52% to 48%. The race was said to have "badly strained relations in Atlanta's black community" as many Black leaders had supported Bond over Lewis. Lewis was "endorsed by the Atlanta newspapers and a favorite of the white liberal establishment". His victory was due to strong results among white voters (a minority in the district). During the campaign, he ran advertisements accusing Bond of corruption, implying that Bond used cocaine, and suggesting that Bond had lied about his civil rights activism.

1986 Georgia's 5th Congressional District Democratic Primary Runoff Election results by precinct Lewis: 50–60%; 60–70%; 70–80%; 80–90%; 90-100%; Bond: 50–60%; 60–70%; 70–80%; 80–90%; 90-100%; No Vote

In the November general election, Lewis defeated Republican Portia Scott 75% to 25%.

==== 1988–2018 ====
Lewis was reelected 18 times, dropping below 70 percent of the vote in the general election only once in 1994, when he defeated Republican Dale Dixon by a 38-point margin, 69%–31%. He ran unopposed in 1996, 2004, 2006, and 2008, and again in 2014 and 2018.

He was challenged in the Democratic primary just twice: in 1992 and 2008. In 1992, he defeated State Representative Mable Thomas 76–24%. In 2008, Thomas decided to challenge Lewis again; Markel Hutchins also contested the race. Lewis defeated Hutchins and Thomas 69–16–15%.

=== Tenure ===
==== Overview ====
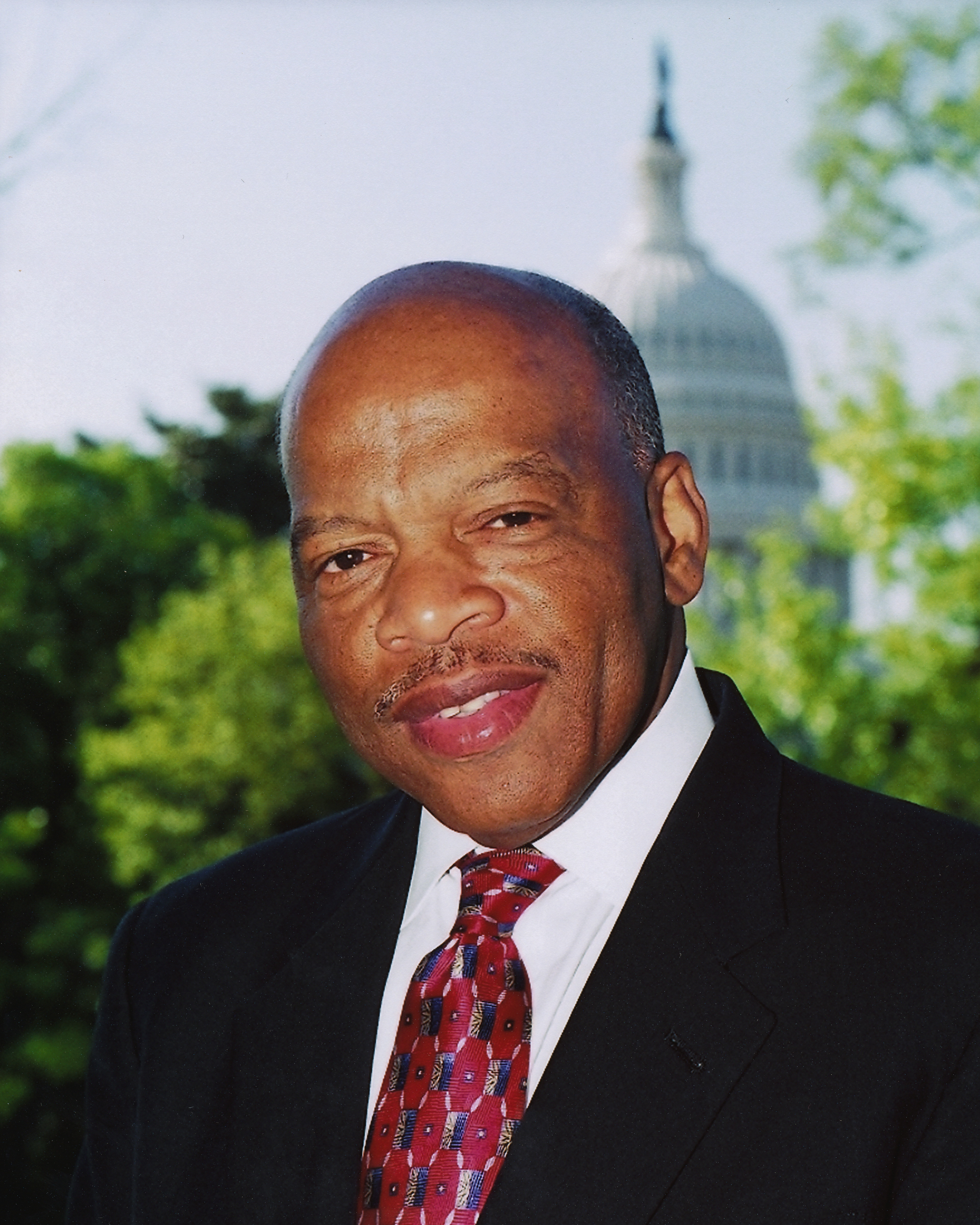
An official portrait of Lewis

Lewis represented Georgia's 5th congressional district, one of the most consistently Democratic districts in the nation. Since its formalization in 1845, the district has been represented by a Democrat for most of its history.

Lewis was one of the most liberal congressmen to have represented a district in the Deep South. He was categorized as a "Hard-Core Liberal" by On the Issues. The Washington Post described Lewis in 1998 as "a fiercely partisan Democrat but ... also fiercely independent". Lewis characterized himself as a strong and adamant liberal. The Atlanta Journal-Constitution said Lewis was the "only former major civil rights leader who extended his fight for human rights and racial reconciliation to the halls of Congress". The Atlanta Journal-Constitution also said that to "those who know him, from U.S. senators to 20-something congressional aides", he is called the "conscience of Congress". Lewis cited Florida Senator and later Representative Claude Pepper, a staunch liberal, as being the colleague whom he most admired. Lewis also spoke out in support of gay rights and national health insurance.

Lewis opposed the 1991 Gulf War, and the 2000 U.S. trade agreement with China that passed the House. He opposed the Clinton administration on NAFTA and welfare reform. After welfare reform passed, Lewis was described as outraged; he said, "Where is the sense of decency? What does it profit a great nation to conquer the world, only to lose its soul?" In 1994, when Clinton considered invading Haiti, Lewis opposed armed intervention. After a non-violent transition of power was negotiated, Lewis supported the presence of U.S. troops in Haiti as part of Operation Uphold Democracy, calling the operation a "mission of peace". In 1998, when Clinton was considering a military strike against Iraq, Lewis said he would back the president if American forces were ordered into action. In 2001, three days after the September 11 attacks, Lewis voted to give President George W. Bush authority to use force against the perpetrators of 9/11 in a vote that was 420–1; Lewis called it probably one of his toughest votes. In 2002, he sponsored the Peace Tax Fund bill, a conscientious objection to military taxation initiative that had been reintroduced yearly since 1972. Lewis was a "fierce partisan critic of President Bush", and an early opponent of the Iraq War. The Associated Press said he was "the first major House figure to suggest impeaching George W. Bush", arguing that the president "deliberately, systematically violated the law" in authorizing the National Security Agency to conduct wiretaps without a warrant. Lewis said, "He is not king, he is president."

Lewis drew on his historical involvement in the Civil Rights Movement as part of his politics. He made an annual pilgrimage to Alabama to retrace the route he marched in 1965 from Selma to Montgomery – a route Lewis worked to make part of the Historic National Trails program. That trip became "one of the hottest tickets in Washington among lawmakers, Republican and Democrat, eager to associate themselves with Lewis and the movement. 'We don't deliberately set out to win votes, but it's very helpful", Lewis said of the trip'." In recent years, however, Faith and Politics Institute drew criticism for selling seats on the trip to lobbyists for at least $25,000 each. According to the Center for Public Integrity, even Lewis said that he would feel "much better" if the institute's funding came from churches and foundations instead of corporations.

On June 3, 2011, the House passed a resolution 268–145, calling for a withdrawal of the United States military from the air and naval operations in and around Libya. Lewis voted against the resolution.

In a 2002 op-ed, Lewis mentioned a response by Dr. Martin Luther King Jr. to an anti-Zionist student at a 1967 Harvard meeting, quoting "When people criticize Zionists they mean Jews, you are talking anti-Semitism." In describing the special relationship between African Americans and American Jews in working for liberation and peace, he also gave other statements by King to the same effect, including one from March 25, 1968: "Peace for Israel means security, and we must stand with all our might to protect its right to exist, its territorial integrity. I see Israel as one of the great outposts of democracy in the world, and a marvelous example of what can be done, how desert land can be transformed into an oasis of brotherhood and democracy. Peace for Israel means security and that security must be a reality."

Lewis "strongly disagreed" with the movement for Boycott, Divestment and Sanctions (BDS) against Israel and co-sponsored a resolution condemning the pro-Palestinian group, but he supported Representatives Ilhan Omar and Rashida Tlaib's House resolution opposing U.S. anti-boycott legislation banning the boycott of Israel. He explained his support as "a simple demonstration of my ongoing commitment to the ability of every American to exercise the fundamental First Amendment right to protest through nonviolent actions".

==== Protests ====
In January 2001, Lewis boycotted the inauguration of George W. Bush by staying in his Atlanta district. He did not attend the swearing-in because he did not believe Bush was the true elected president. Later, Lewis joined 30 other House Democrats who voted to not count the 20 electoral votes from Ohio in the 2004 presidential election.

In March 2003, Lewis spoke to a crowd of 30,000 in Oregon during an anti-war protest before the start of the Iraq War. In 2006 and 2009 he was arrested for protesting against the genocide in Darfur outside the Sudanese embassy. He was one of eight U.S. Representatives, from six states, arrested while holding a sit-in near the west side of the U.S. Capitol building, to advocate for immigration reform.

==== 2008 presidential election ====
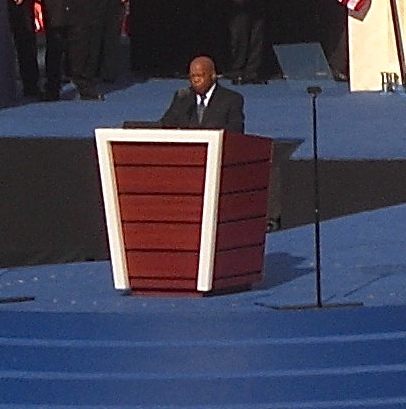
Lewis speaks during the final day of the 2008 Democratic National Convention in Denver, Colorado

At first, Lewis supported Hillary Clinton, endorsing her presidential campaign on October 12, 2007. On February 14, 2008, however, he announced he was considering withdrawing his support from Clinton and might instead cast his superdelegate vote for Barack Obama: "Something is happening in America and people are prepared and ready to make that great leap." Ben Smith of Politico said that "it would be a seminal moment in the race if John Lewis were to switch sides."

On February 27, 2008, Lewis formally changed his support and endorsed Obama. After Obama clinched the Democratic nomination for president, Lewis said "If someone had told me this would be happening now, I would have told them they were crazy, out of their mind, they didn't know what they were talking about ... I just wish the others were around to see this day. ... To the people who were beaten, put in jail, were asked questions they could never answer to register to vote, it's amazing." Despite switching his support to Obama, Lewis drew criticism from his constituents for his support of Clinton for several months. One of his challengers in the House primary election set up campaign headquarters inside the building that served as Obama's Georgia office.

In October 2008, Lewis issued a statement criticizing the presidential campaign of John McCain and his running mate Sarah Palin and accusing them of "sowing the seeds of hatred and division" in a way that brought to mind the late Gov. George Wallace and "another destructive period" in American political history. McCain said he was "saddened" by the criticism from "a man I've always admired", and called on Obama to repudiate Lewis's statement. Obama responded to the statement, saying that he "does not believe that John McCain or his policy criticism is in any way comparable to George Wallace or his segregationist policies". Lewis later issued a follow-up statement clarifying that he had not compared McCain and Palin to Wallace himself, but rather that his earlier statement was a "reminder to all Americans that toxic language can lead to destructive behavior".

On an African American being elected president, he said:

If you ask me whether the election ... is the fulfillment of Dr. King's dream, I say, 'No, it's just a down payment.' There's still too many people 50 years later, there's still too many people that are being left out and left behind.

After Obama's swearing-in ceremony as president, Lewis asked him to sign a commemorative photograph of the event. Obama signed it, "Because of you, John. Barack Obama."

==== 2016 firearm safety legislation sit-in ====
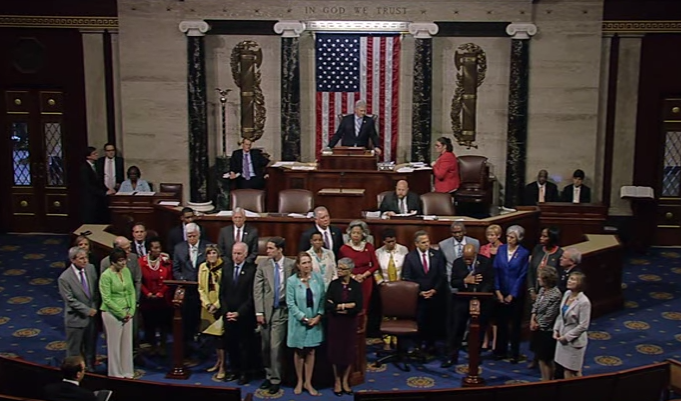
House Democrats, led by Lewis, take the floor to begin a sit-in demanding gun safety legislation on June 22, 2016

On June 22, 2016, House Democrats, led by Lewis and Massachusetts Representative Katherine Clark, began a sit-in demanding House Speaker Paul Ryan allow a vote on gun-safety legislation in the aftermath of the Orlando nightclub shooting. Speaker pro tempore Daniel Webster ordered the House into recess, but Democrats refused to leave the chamber for nearly 26 hours.

==== National African American Museum ====
In 1988, the year after he was sworn into Congress, Lewis introduced a bill to create a national African American museum in Washington. The bill failed, and for 15 years he continued to introduce it with each new Congress. Each time it was blocked in the Senate, most often by conservative Southern Senator Jesse Helms. In 2003, Helms retired. The bill won bipartisan support, and President George W. Bush signed the bill to establish the museum, with the Smithsonian's Board of Regents to establish the location. The National Museum of African American History and Culture, located adjacent to the Washington Monument, held its opening ceremony on September 25, 2016.

==== 2016 presidential election ====
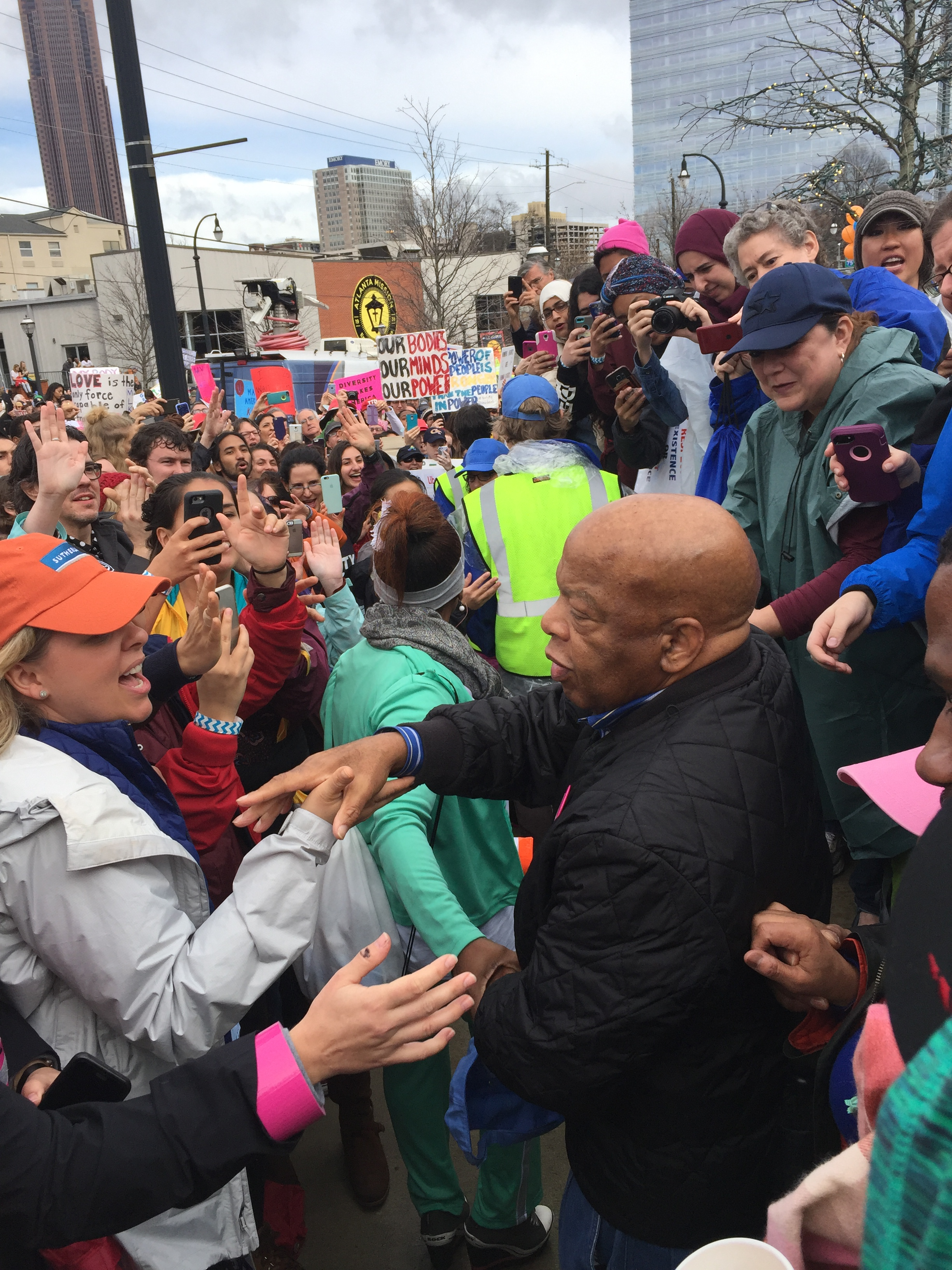
Lewis at the 2017 Women's March in Atlanta

Lewis supported Hillary Clinton in the 2016 Democratic presidential primaries against Bernie Sanders. Regarding Sanders' role in the civil rights movement, Lewis remarked "To be very frank, I never saw him, I never met him. I chaired the Student Nonviolent Coordinating Committee for three years, from 1963 to 1966. I was involved in sit-ins, in the Freedom Rides, the March on Washington, the March from Selma to Montgomery ... but I met Hillary Clinton". Former Congressman and Hawaii Governor Neil Abercrombie wrote a letter to Lewis expressing his disappointment with Lewis's comments about Sanders. Lewis later clarified his statement, saying "During the late 1950s and 1960s when I was more engaged, [Sanders] was not there. I did not see him around. I have never seen him in the South. But if he was there, if he was involved someplace, I was not aware of it ... The fact that I did not meet him in the movement does not mean I doubted that Senator Sanders participated in the civil rights movement, neither was I attempting to disparage his activism."

In a January 2016 interview, Lewis compared Donald Trump, then the Republican front-runner for the presidential nomination, to former Alabama Governor George Wallace: "I've been around a while and Trump reminds me so much of a lot of the things that George Wallace said and did. I think demagogues are pretty dangerous, really ... We shouldn't divide people, we shouldn't separate people."

On January 13, 2017, during an interview with NBC's Chuck Todd for Meet the Press, Lewis stated: "I don't see the president-elect as a legitimate president." He added, "I think the Russians participated in having this man get elected, and they helped destroy the candidacy of Hillary Clinton. I don't plan to attend the inauguration. I think there was a conspiracy on the part of the Russians, and others, that helped him get elected. That's not right. That's not fair. That's not the open, democratic process." Trump replied on Twitter the following day, suggesting that Lewis should "spend more time on fixing and helping his district, which is in horrible shape and falling apart (not to [...] mention crime infested) rather than falsely complaining about the election results", and accusing Lewis of being "All talk, talk, talk – no action or results. Sad!" Trump's statement about Lewis's district was rated as "Mostly False" by PolitiFact, and he was criticized for attacking a civil rights leader such as Lewis, especially one who was brutally beaten for the cause, and especially on Martin Luther King weekend. Senator John McCain acknowledged Lewis as "an American hero" but criticized him, saying: "this is not the first time that Congressman Lewis has taken a very extreme stand and condemned without any shred of evidence for doing so an incoming president of the United States. This is a stain on Congressman Lewis's reputation – no one else's."

A few days later, Lewis said that he would not attend Trump's inauguration because he did not believe that Trump was the true elected president. "It will be the first (inauguration) that I miss since I've been in Congress. You cannot be at home with something that you feel that is wrong, is not right", he said. Lewis had failed to attend George W. Bush's inauguration in 2001 because he believed that he too was not a legitimately elected president. Lewis's statement was rated as "Pants on Fire" by PolitiFact.

==== 2020 presidential election ====
Lewis endorsed Joe Biden for president on April 7, 2020, a day before Biden effectively secured the Democratic nomination. He recommended Biden pick a woman of color as his running mate.

=== Committee assignments ===
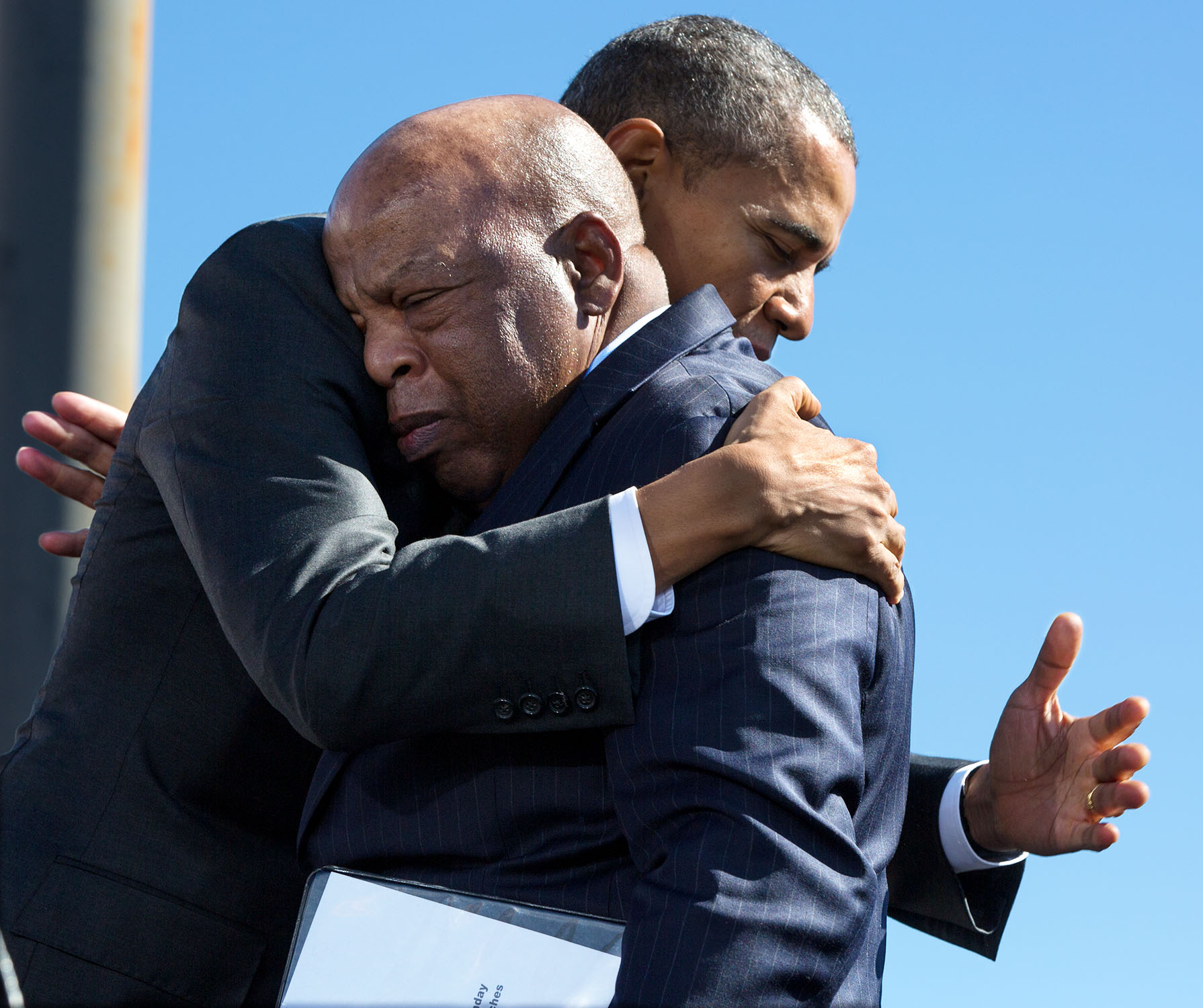
President Barack Obama hugs Lewis during a commemoration of the 50th anniversary of Bloody Sunday and the Selma to Montgomery voting rights marches, March 7, 2015

Lewis served on the following Congressional committees at the time of his death:

- Committee on Ways and Means
  - Subcommittee on Oversight (chair)
- United States Congress Joint Committee on Taxation

=== Caucus memberships ===
Lewis was a member of over 40 caucuses, including:

- Chronic Obstructive Pulmonary Disease (COPD) Caucus (Co-chair)
- Congressional Structured Settlements Caucus (Co-chair)
- Congressional Black Caucus
- Congressional Progressive Caucus
- Congressional Brazil Caucus
- Congressional Arts Caucus

In 1991, Lewis became the senior chief deputy whip in the Democratic caucus.

== Biographies ==
External videos
- Booknotes interview with Lewis on Walking With the Wind, July 12, 1998, C-SPAN
- Q&A interview with Lewis on Across That Bridge, August 5, 2012, C-SPAN
- In Depth interview with Lewis, October 6, 2013, C-SPAN

Lewis's 1998 autobiography Walking with the Wind: A Memoir of the Movement, co-written with Mike D'Orso, won the Robert F. Kennedy Book Award, the Anisfield-Wolf Book Award, the Christopher Award and the Lillian Smith Book Award. It appeared on numerous bestseller lists, was selected as a New York Times Notable Book of the Year, was named by the American Library Association as its Nonfiction Book of the Year, and was included among Newsweek magazine's 2009 list of "50 Books For Our Times". It was critically acclaimed, with The Washington Post calling it "the definitive account of the civil rights movement" and the Los Angeles Times proclaiming it "destined to become a classic in civil rights literature".

His life is also the subject of a 2002 book for young people, John Lewis: From Freedom Rider to Congressman. In 2012, Lewis released Across That Bridge, written with Brenda Jones, to mixed reviews. Publishers Weekly's review said, "At its best, the book provides a testament to the power of nonviolence in social movements ... At its worst, it resembles an extended campaign speech."

=== March (2013) ===
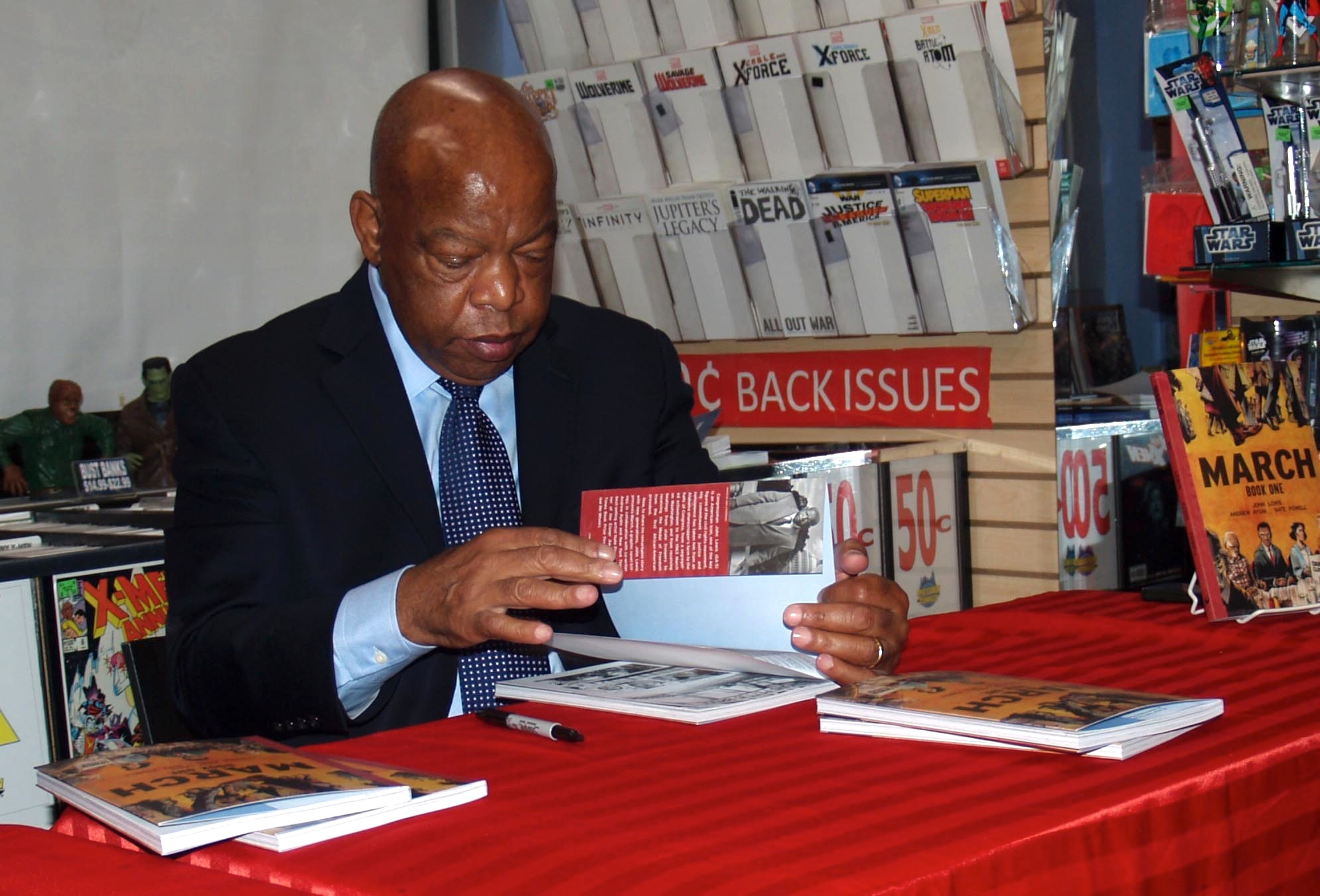
Lewis signing copies of March Book One (2013), the first volume of his graphic novel autobiography, at Midtown Comics in Manhattan

External videos
- Presentation by Lewis and Andrew Aydin on March: Book Two, November 21, 2015, C-SPAN
- Interview with Lewis and Aydin on March: Book Three, September 24, 2016, C-SPAN

In 2013, Lewis became the first member of Congress to write a graphic novel, with the launch of a trilogy titled March. The March trilogy is a black and white comics trilogy about the Civil Rights Movement, told through the perspective of civil rights leader and U.S. Congressman John Lewis. The first volume, March: Book One is written by Lewis and Andrew Aydin, illustrated and lettered by Nate Powell and was published in August 2013, the second volume, March: Book Two was published in January 2015 and the final volume, March: Book Three was published in August 2016.

In an August 2014 interview, Lewis, aged 74, cited the influence of a 1958 comic book, Martin Luther King and the Montgomery Story, on his decision to adapt his experience to the graphic novel format. March: Book One became a number one New York Times bestseller for graphic novels and spent more than a year on the lists.

March: Book One received an "Author Honor" from the American Library Association's 2014 Coretta Scott King Book Awards, which honors an African American author of a children's book. Book One also became the first graphic novel to win a Robert F. Kennedy Book Award, receiving a "Special Recognition" bust in 2014.

March: Book One was selected by first-year reading programs in 2014 at Michigan State University, Georgia State University, and Marquette University.

March: Book Two was released in 2015 and immediately became both a New York Times and Washington Post bestseller for graphic novels.

The release of March: Book Three in August 2016 brought all three volumes into the top 3 slots of the New York Times bestseller list for graphic novels for 6 consecutive weeks. The third volume was announced as the recipient of the 2017 Printz Award for excellence in young-adult literature, the Coretta Scott King Award, the YALSA Award for Excellence in Nonfiction, the 2016 National Book Award in Young People's Literature, and the Sibert Medal at the American Library Association's annual Midwinter Meeting in January 2017.

The March trilogy received the Carter G. Woodson Book Award in the Secondary (grades 7–12) category in 2017.

=== Run (2018) ===
In 2018, Lewis and Andrew Aydin co-wrote another graphic novel as a sequel to the March series entitled Run, which documents Lewis's life after the passage of the Civil Rights Act. The authors teamed with illustrator Afua Richardson for the book, which was originally scheduled to be released in August 2018, but was later rescheduled. It was released on August 3, 2021, a year after his death, as it was one of his last endeavours before he died. Nate Powell, who illustrated March, also contributed to the art.

== Personal life ==
=== Marriage and family ===
Lewis met his future wife Lillian Miles at a New Year's Eve party hosted by Xernona Clayton. Lillian worked for the library of Atlanta University at the time. The two of them married one year later in 1968. In 1976, they had a son, who also works in politics. Lillian died on December 31, 2012, their 45th marriage anniversary

He has a grandson who lives in Paris.

=== Illness and death ===
On December 29, 2019, Lewis, then 79 years old, announced that he had been diagnosed with stage IV pancreatic cancer. He remained in the Washington D.C. area for his treatment. Lewis stated: "I have been in some kind of fight – for freedom, equality, basic human rights – for nearly my entire life. I have never faced a fight quite like the one I have now."

On June 7, 2020, the day after completing a round of chemotherapy, an emaciated Lewis made his last public appearance with a visit to a large Black Lives Matter mural painted on the surface of Sixteenth Street in Washington, D.C.. Days earlier, protesters had been tear-gassed at that location by U.S. Park Police and Secret Service, under orders from President Donald Trump.

External videos
- Memorial service for Lewis, at Troy University, Troy, Alabama, July 25, 2020, C-SPAN
- Edmund Pettus Bridge processional in honor of Lewis, July 26, 2020, C-SPAN
- Memorial service for Lewis at the U.S. Capitol, July 27, 2020, C-SPAN
- Funeral service for Lewis at Ebenezer Baptist Church, Atlanta, Georgia, July 30, 2020, C-SPAN

On July 17, 2020, Lewis died in Atlanta at the age of 80, on the same day in the same city as his friend and fellow civil rights activist C.T. Vivian. Lewis had been the final surviving "Big Six" civil rights icon.

Then-president Donald Trump ordered all flags to be flown at half-staff in response to Lewis's death. Condolences also came from the international community, with Swedish Prime Minister Stefan Löfven, French President Emmanuel Macron, Irish President Michael D. Higgins among others, all memorializing Lewis.

=== Funeral services ===
Public ceremonies honoring Lewis began in his hometown of Troy, Alabama, at Troy University, which had denied him admission in 1957 due to racial segregation. His casket was then taken for a memorial held at the historic Brown Chapel A.M.E. Church in Selma, Alabama. Calls to rename the Edmund Pettus Bridge in Selma, in Lewis's honor grew after his death. On July 26, 2020, his casket, carried in a horse-drawn caisson, traveled the same route over the bridge that he walked during the Bloody Sunday march from Selma to Montgomery, before his lying in state at the Alabama State Capitol in Montgomery.

United States House of Representatives Speaker Nancy Pelosi and Senate Majority Leader Mitch McConnell announced that Lewis would lie in state in the United States Capitol Rotunda on July 27 and 28, with a public viewing and procession through Washington, D.C. He is the first African-American lawmaker to be so honored in the Rotunda; in October 2019 his colleague, representative Elijah Cummings, lay in state in the Capitol Statuary Hall. Health concerns related to the ongoing COVID-19 pandemic led to a decision to have his casket displayed outdoors on the East Front steps during the public viewing hours, rather than the usual line of people in the Rotunda filing past the casket to pay their respects. On July 29, 2020, Lewis's casket left the U.S. Capitol and was transported back to Atlanta, Georgia, where he lay in state at the Georgia State Capitol.

Among the distinguished speakers at his final funeral service at Atlanta's Ebenezer Baptist Church were former U.S. Presidents Bill Clinton, George W. Bush, and Barack Obama, who gave the eulogy. Former President Jimmy Carter, unable to travel during the COVID-19 pandemic due to his advanced age, sent a statement to be read during the service. The then-current President Donald Trump did not attend the service. Lewis was buried at Atlanta's historic South-View Cemetery.

Lewis penned an op-ed to the nation that was published in The New York Times on the day of his funeral. In it, he called on the younger generation to continue the work for justice and an end to hate.

== Honors ==
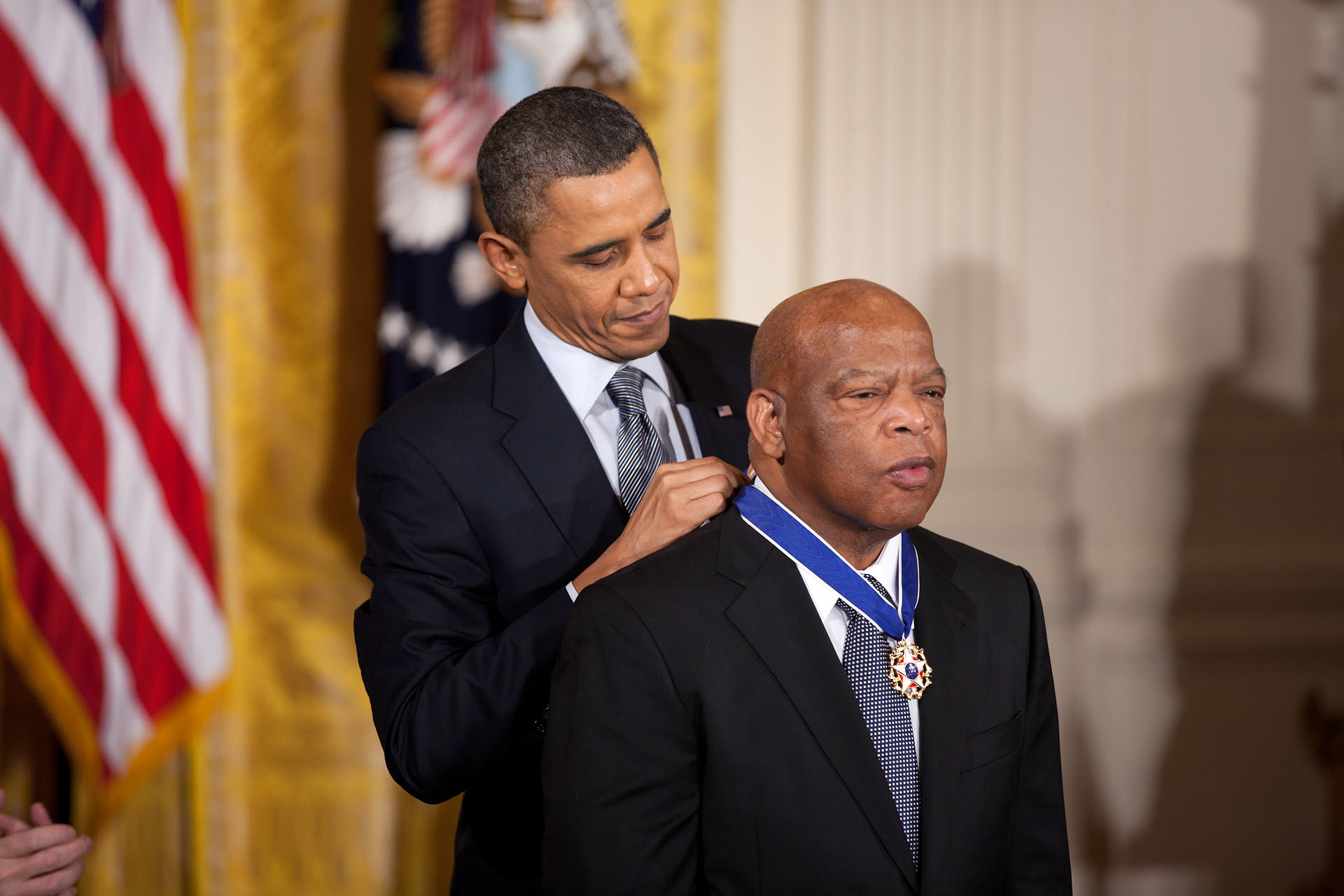
Presidential Medal of Freedom awarded by President Barack Obama in 2011

Lewis was honored by having the 1997 sculpture by Thornton Dial, The Bridge, placed at Ponce de Leon Avenue and Freedom Park, Atlanta, dedicated to him by the artist. In 1999, Lewis was awarded the Wallenberg Medal from the University of Michigan in recognition of his courageous lifelong commitment to the defense of civil and human rights. In that same year, he received the Four Freedoms Award for the Freedom of Speech.

In 2001, the John F. Kennedy Library Foundation awarded Lewis the Profile in Courage Award "for his extraordinary courage, leadership and commitment to civil rights". However, it was not the regular award, but rather a special Profile in Courage Award for Lifetime Achievement which has been given out only twice, John Lewis and William Winter (in 2008). The next year he was awarded the Spingarn Medal from the NAACP.

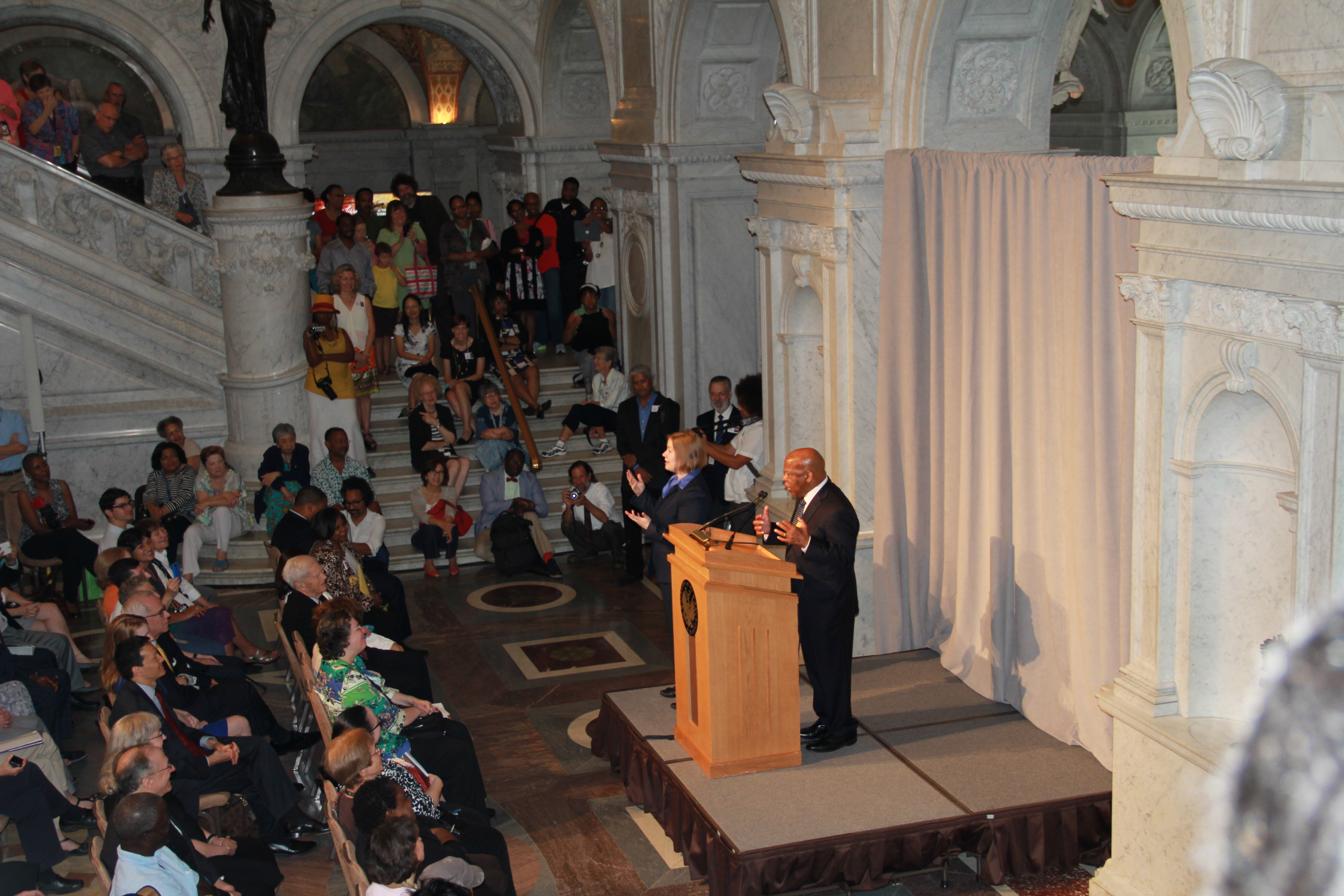
Lewis addressing audience in the Great Hall of the Library of Congress on the 50th Anniversary of the March on Washington for Jobs and Freedom, August 28, 2013

In 2004, Lewis received the Golden Plate Award of the American Academy of Achievement presented by Awards Council member James Earl Jones.

In 2006, he received the U.S. Senator John Heinz Award for Greatest Public Service by an Elected or Appointed Official, an award given out annually by Jefferson Awards for Public Service. In September 2007, Lewis was awarded the Dole Leadership Prize from the Robert J. Dole Institute of Politics at the University of Kansas.

Lewis was the only living speaker from the March on Washington present on the stage during the inauguration of Barack Obama. Obama signed a commemorative photograph for Lewis with the words, "Because of you, John. Barack Obama."

In 2010, Lewis was awarded the first LBJ Liberty and Justice for All Award, given to him by the Lyndon Baines Johnson Foundation, and the next year, Lewis was awarded the Presidential Medal of Freedom by President Barack Obama.

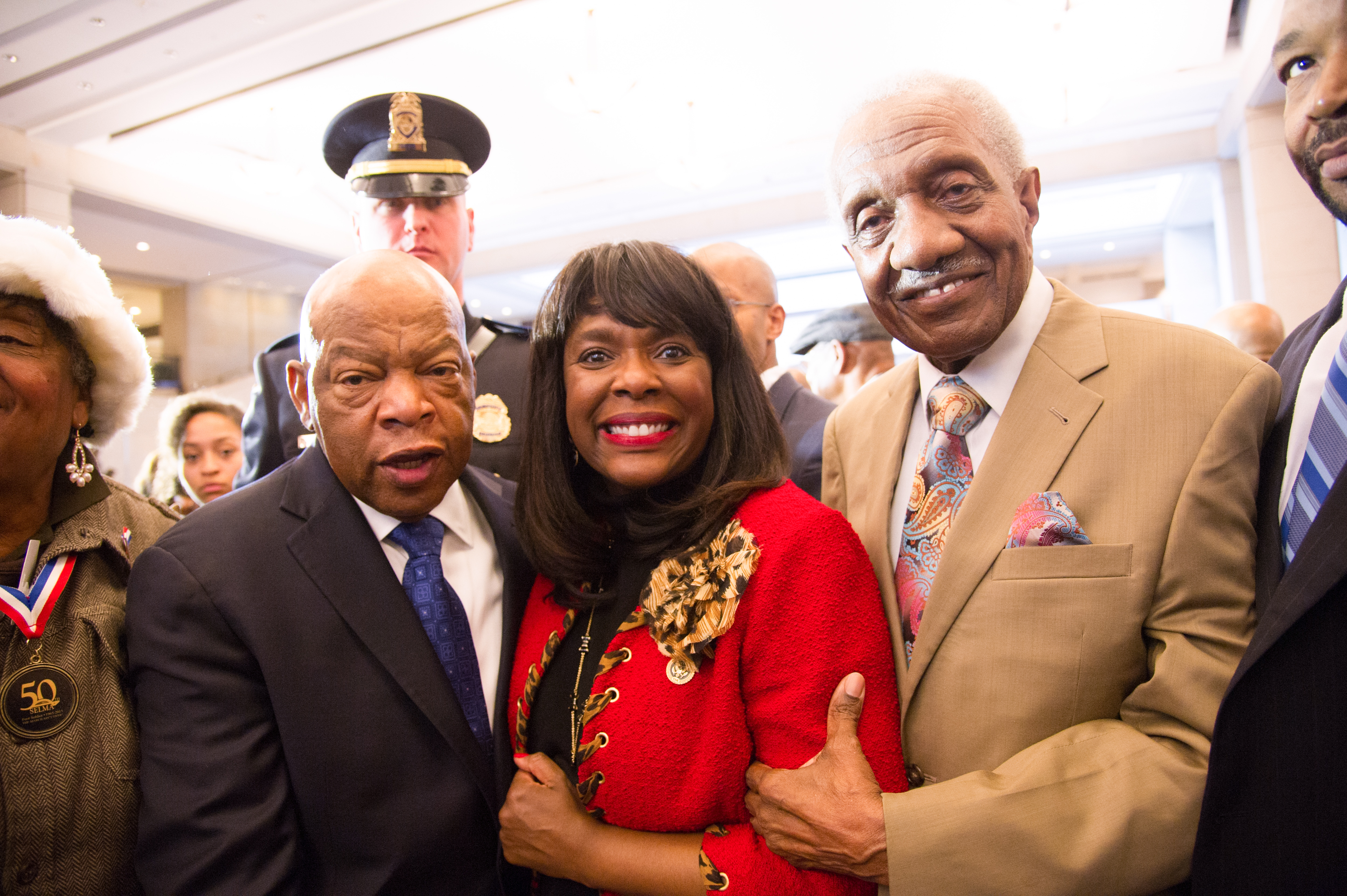
Lewis with Frederick D. Reese and Terri Sewell at a 2016 Congressional Gold Medal Ceremony honoring the Selma to Montgomery marches.

In 2016, it was announced that a future United States Navy underway replenishment oiler would be named USNS John Lewis. Also in 2016, Lewis and fellow Selma marcher Frederick Reese accepted Congressional Gold Medals which were bestowed to the "foot soldiers" of the Selma marchers. The same year, Lewis was awarded the Liberty Medal at the National Constitution Center. The prestigious award has been awarded to international leaders from Malala Yousafzai to the 14th Dalai Lama, presidents George Bush and Bill Clinton and other dignitaries and visionaries. The timing of Lewis's award coincided with the 150th anniversary of the 14th amendment. In 2020, Lewis was awarded the Walter P. Reuther Humanitarian Award by Wayne State University, the UAW, and the Reuther family.

Lewis gave numerous commencement addresses, including at the School of Visual Arts (SVA) in 2014, Bates College (in Lewiston, Maine) and Washington University in St. Louis in 2016, Bard College and Bank Street College of Education in 2017, and Harvard University in 2018.

Lewis was recognized for his involvement with comics with the 2017 Inkpot Award.

On July 30, 2018, the Atlanta City Council voted to rename Atlanta's Freedom Parkway John Lewis Freedom Parkway. On November 5, 2020, the Metropolitan Council of Nashville and Davidson County voted to rename an extensive part of Nashville, Tennessee's 5th Avenue John Lewis Way.

On June 23, 2020, the Fairfax County Public School Board voted to change the name of Robert E. Lee High School to John R. Lewis High School which is located in Springfield, Virginia. A program called John Lewis Now was created in his vision to provide students with in-school curriculum and out-of-school experiences in leadership and government utilizing the nearby Washington D.C. area.

Lewis's death in July 2020 has given rise to support for renaming the historically significant Pettus bridge in Lewis's honor, an idea previously floated years ago. After his death, the Board of Fairfax County Public Schools announced that Robert E. Lee High School in Springfield, Virginia would be renamed John R. Lewis High School.

Following his death, Troy University announced that the main building on its flagship campus would bear the name of John Lewis. The building, which was the oldest on campus, was previously named after Bibb Graves, a former governor of Alabama and high-ranking officer of the Ku Klux Klan.

On August 1, 2020, a statue of Lewis was revealed by sculptor Gregory Johnson. The statue was commissioned by Rodney Mims Cook Jr. and was installed at Cook Park in Atlanta, Georgia, in April 2021.

On February 21, 2021, President Joe Biden marked Lewis's late birthday on Twitter, urging all Americans to "carry on his mission in the fight for justice and equality for all." He tweeted, "While my dear friend may no longer be with us, his life and legacy provide an eternal moral compass on which direction to march. May we carry on his mission in the fight for justice and equality for all."

On October 2, 2021, Seattle opened the John Lewis Memorial Bridge.

On October 27, 2021, the University of California, Santa Cruz named one of its residential colleges, formerly known as College Ten, John R Lewis College.

On August 16, 2024, a statue of Lewis by Basil Watson was installed in Decatur, Georgia, in the place where an obelisk monument to the Confederacy was put by the United Daughters of the Confederacy in 1908; the obelisk was removed in 2020. Also in 2024, Steadfast Stride Toward Justice, another statue of Lewis by Watson, was installed in Montgomery, Alabama.

John Lewis Plaza in Chicago, where the Obama Presidential Center is located, is named for Lewis as well.

=== Honorary academic degrees ===
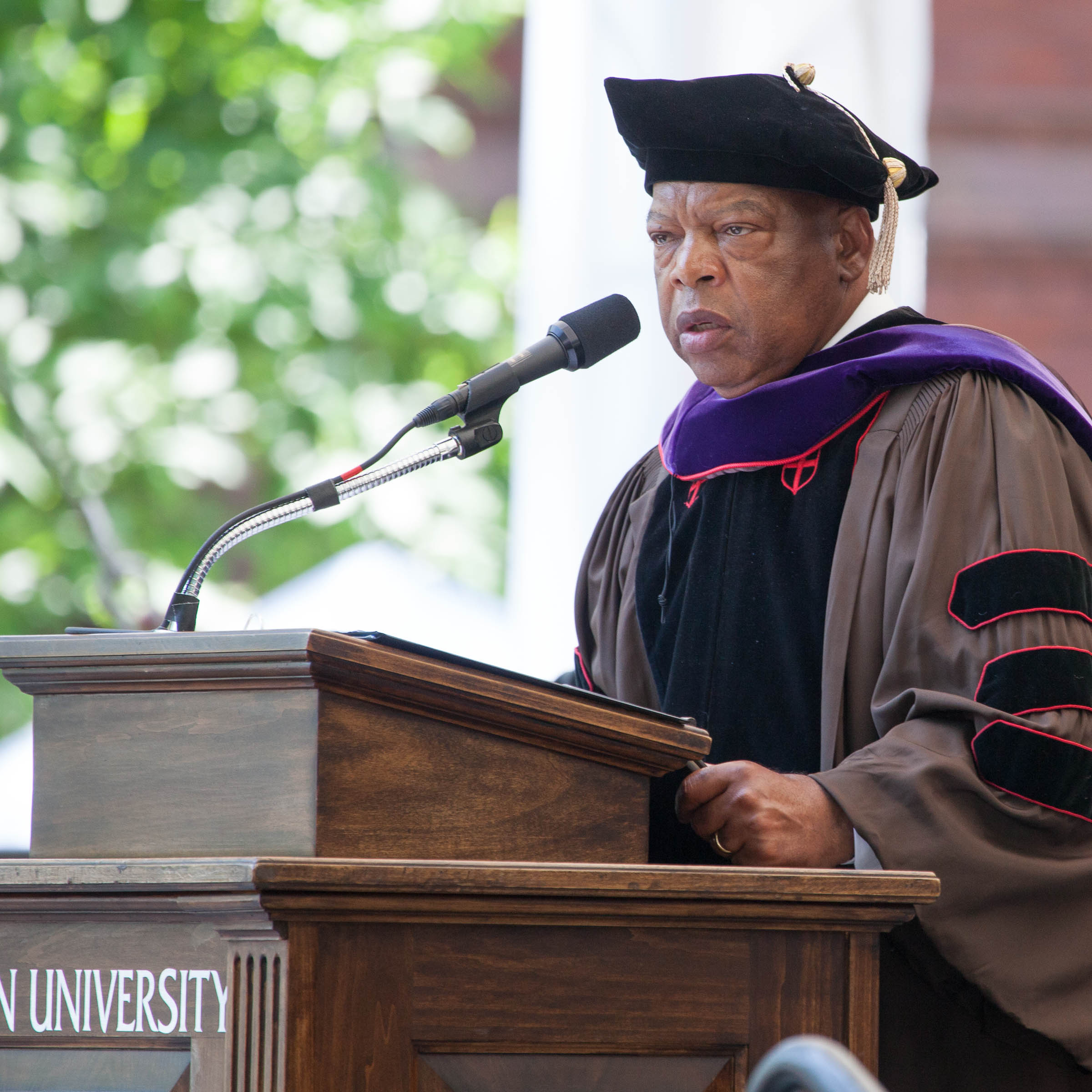
Lewis receives an honorary degree from Brown University in 2012

Lewis was awarded more than 50 honorary degrees, including:

- 1989: Honorary Doctor of Laws degree from Troy State University (now Troy University)
- 1995: Honorary Doctor of Public Service degree from Northeastern University
- 1998: Honorary Humane Letters degree from Brandeis University
- 1999: Honorary Doctor of Laws degree from the University of Massachusetts Boston
- 1999: Honorary Doctor of Laws degree from Knox College
- 2001: Honorary Doctor of Laws degree from University at Albany
- 2002: Honorary D.H.L. from Howard University
- 2003: Honorary Doctor of Laws degree from the College of Wooster
- 2004: Honorary degree from Portland State University
- 2004: Honorary LHD from Juniata College
- 2007: Honorary LL.D. degree from the University of Vermont
- 2007: Honorary LL.D. degree from Adelphi University
- 2012: Honorary LL.D. degrees from Brown University, University of Pennsylvania, Harvard University, and the University of Connecticut School of Law
- 2013: Honorary Doctor of Humane Letters from Judson College
- 2013: Honorary LL.D. degrees from Cleveland State University and Union College
- 2014: Honorary LL.D. degree from Emory University
- 2014: Honorary Doctorate of Fine Arts from the School of Visual Arts.
- 2014: Honorary Bachelor of Arts from Lawrence University.
- 2014: Honorary Doctor of Letters degree from Marquette University
- 2015: Honorary Doctorate of Humane Letters from the McCourt School of Public Policy, Georgetown University.
- 2015: Honorary Doctor of Humane Letters from Lawrence University
- 2015: Honorary degree from Goucher College
- 2015: Honorary Doctor of Laws degree from Hampton University
- 2016: Honorary Doctorate of Humane Letters from New York University
- 2016: Honorary Doctor of Humane Letters from Bates College
- 2016: Honorary Doctor of Humane Letters from Washington University in St. Louis
- 2016: Honorary Doctor of Policy Analysis from the Frederick S. Pardee RAND Graduate School
- 2016: Honorary Doctor of Laws degree from Washington and Jefferson College
- 2017: Honorary Doctor of Laws degree from Yale University
- 2017: Honorary Doctor of Laws degree from Berea College
- 2017: Honorary Doctor of Humane Letters degree from Bank Street Graduate School of Education
- 2018: Honorary Doctor of Law degree from Boston University
- 2019: Honorary Doctor of Humane Letters degree from City College of New York
- 2019: Honorary Doctorate from Tulane University

== Electoral history ==
Georgia's 9th congressional district: Results 1986–2018
Year	Democratic	Votes	%	Republican	Votes	%
1986	John Lewis	93,229	75%	Portia Scott	30,562	25%
1988	John Lewis	135,194	78%	J. W. Tibbs	37,693	22%
1990	John Lewis	86,037	76%	J. W. Tibbs	27,781	24%
1992	John Lewis	147,445	72%	Paul Stabler	56,960	28%
1994	John Lewis	85,094	69%	Dale Dixon	37,999	31%
1996	John Lewis	136,555	100%	No candidate		
1998	John Lewis	109,177	79%	John H. Lewis	29,877	21%
2000	John Lewis	137,333	77%	Hank Schwab	40,606	23%
2002	John Lewis	116,259	100%	No candidate		
2004	John Lewis	201,773	100%	No candidate		
2006	John Lewis	122,380	100%	No candidate		
2008	John Lewis	231,368	100%	No candidate		
2010	John Lewis	130,782	74%	Fenn Little	46,622	26%
2012	John Lewis	234,330	84%	Howard Stopeck	43,335	16%
2014	John Lewis	170,326	100%	No candidate		
2016	John Lewis	253,781	84%	Douglas Bell	46,768	16%
2018	John Lewis	273,084	100%	No candidate		

== In popular culture ==
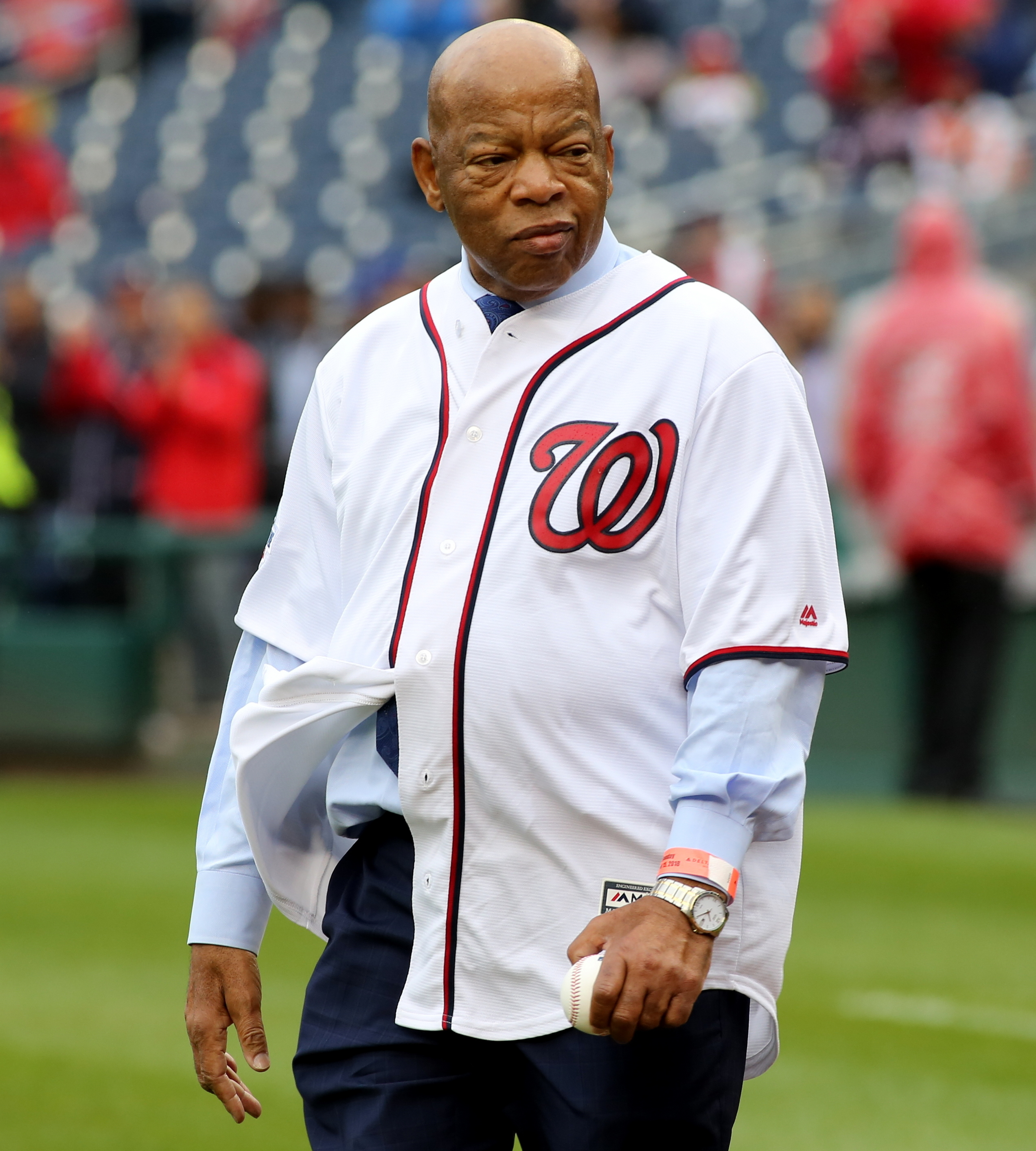
Lewis at Nationals Park in 2018 to throw out the ceremonial first pitch before Jackie Robinson Day

Lewis was portrayed by Stephan James in the 2014 film Selma. He made a cameo appearance in the music video for Young Jeezy's song "My President", which was released in the month of Obama's inauguration. In 2018, John Lewis voiced himself in the Arthur episode "Arthur Takes a Stand". Lewis's life was chronicled in the 2017 PBS documentary John Lewis: Get in the Way and the 2020 CNN Films documentary John Lewis: Good Trouble.

Lewis appeared in the 2019 documentary Bobby Kennedy for President, in which Lewis commends Robert F. Kennedy, especially in regards to his support for civil rights throughout his time as a senator for New York, and during Kennedy's 1968 presidential campaign. Lewis also recounted his deep sorrow following the 1968 assassinations of Kennedy and Martin Luther King Jr.

Lewis appeared alongside Amandla Stenberg to present Green Book as a nominee for Best Picture at the 91st Academy Awards that took place on February 24, 2019.

Lewis attended comics conventions to promote his graphic novel, most notably San Diego Comic-Con, which he attended in 2013, 2015, 2016, and 2017. During the 2015 convention, Lewis led, along with his graphic novel collaborators Andrew Aydin and Nate Powell, an impromptu simulated Selma civil rights march arm in arm with children, during which he wore the same clothes as he did on Bloody Sunday, garnering thousands of con goers to participate. The event became so popular it was repeated in 2016 and 2017.

== Bibliography ==
- Reporting Civil Rights: American Journalism 1963–1973 (Library of America: 2003) ISBN 1-931082-29-4
- Lewis, John; D'Orso, Michael (1999). Walking with the Wind. San Diego: Houghton Mifflin Harcourt. ISBN 0-15-600708-8. The U.S. Congressman tells of life in the trenches of the Civil Rights Movement, the numerous arrests, sit-ins, and marches that led to breaking down the barriers of discrimination in the South during the 1950s and 1960s.
- John Lewis in the Lead: A Story of the Civil Rights Movement by Jim Haskins and Kathleen Benson, illustrated by Benny Andrews, (Lee & Low Books: 2006) ISBN 978-1-58430-250-6. A biography of John Lewis, one of the "Big Six" leaders who were chairman of activist groups organizing the 1963 March on Washington, focusing on his involvement in Freedom Rides, the March on Washington, and the march across the Edmund Pettus Bridge in the 1965 Selma to Montgomery marches.
- John Lewis: From Freedom Rider to Congressman by Christine M. Hill, (Enslow Publishers, Inc., 2002) ISBN 0-7660-1768-0. A biography of John Lewis written for juvenile readers.
- Freedom Riders: John Lewis and Jim Zwerg on the Frontlines of the Civil Rights Movement by Ann Bausum, (National Geographic Society, 2006) ISBN 0-7922-4173-8.
- Across That Bridge by John Lewis with Brenda Jones, (Hyperion: 2012) ISBN 978-1-4013-2411-7. Winner of the 2013 NAACP Image Award for Outstanding Literary Work/Biography. It is an accessible discussion of Lewis's philosophy and his viewpoint of the philosophical basis of the Civil Rights Movement.
- March: Book One a 2013 illustrated comic history of Lewis's career, with sequels published in 2015 and 2016, by John Lewis, Andrew Aydin, and Nate Powell, (Top Shelf Productions) ISBN 978-1-60309-300-2.
- Carry On: Reflections for a New Generation from John Lewis (2021)
- Greenberg, David (October 8, 2024). John Lewis: A Life. Simon and Schuster. ISBN 978-1-9821-4299-5.

== See also ==
- John Lewis Voting Rights Act
- List of African-American United States representatives
- List of civil rights leaders
- List of members of the United States Congress who died in office (2000–present)#2020s

== Citations ==
Non-profit organization positions
Preceded by Charles McDew	Chair of the Student Nonviolent Coordinating Committee; 1963–1966	Succeeded by Stokely Carmichael
U.S. House of Representatives
Preceded by Wyche Fowler	Member of the U.S. House of Representatives from Georgia's 5th congressional district 1987–2020	Succeeded by Kwanza Hall
Party political offices
Preceded by David Bonior as House Democratic Chief Deputy Whip	House Democratic Senior Chief Deputy Whip; 1991–2020; Served alongside: 2019–2020: Cedric Richmond (Assistant to the Majority Whip), Jan Schakowsky	Succeeded by Jan Schakowsky
