= Steadfast Stride Toward Justice =

Monument in Montgomery, Alabama, United States

- Interactive map of Steadfast Stride Toward Justice
- Location: Legacy Plaza, Montgomery, Alabama, United States
- Coordinates: 32°22′53.5″N 86°18′31″W
- Designer: Basil Watson
- Type: Statue
- Material: Bronze
- Dedicated date: November 12, 2024
- Dedicated to: John Lewis

Steadfast Stride Toward Justice is a statue of civil rights activist and politician John Lewis located in Montgomery, Alabama, United States. The monument was designed by sculptor Basil Watson and was dedicated in 2024. It is located in the Legacy Plaza, near The Legacy Museum, and was erected by the Equal Justice Initiative, which operates the museum. Two additional statues, both also designed by Watson, are located in the plaza and depict fellow civil rights activists Martin Luther King Jr. and Rosa Parks.

== Description ==
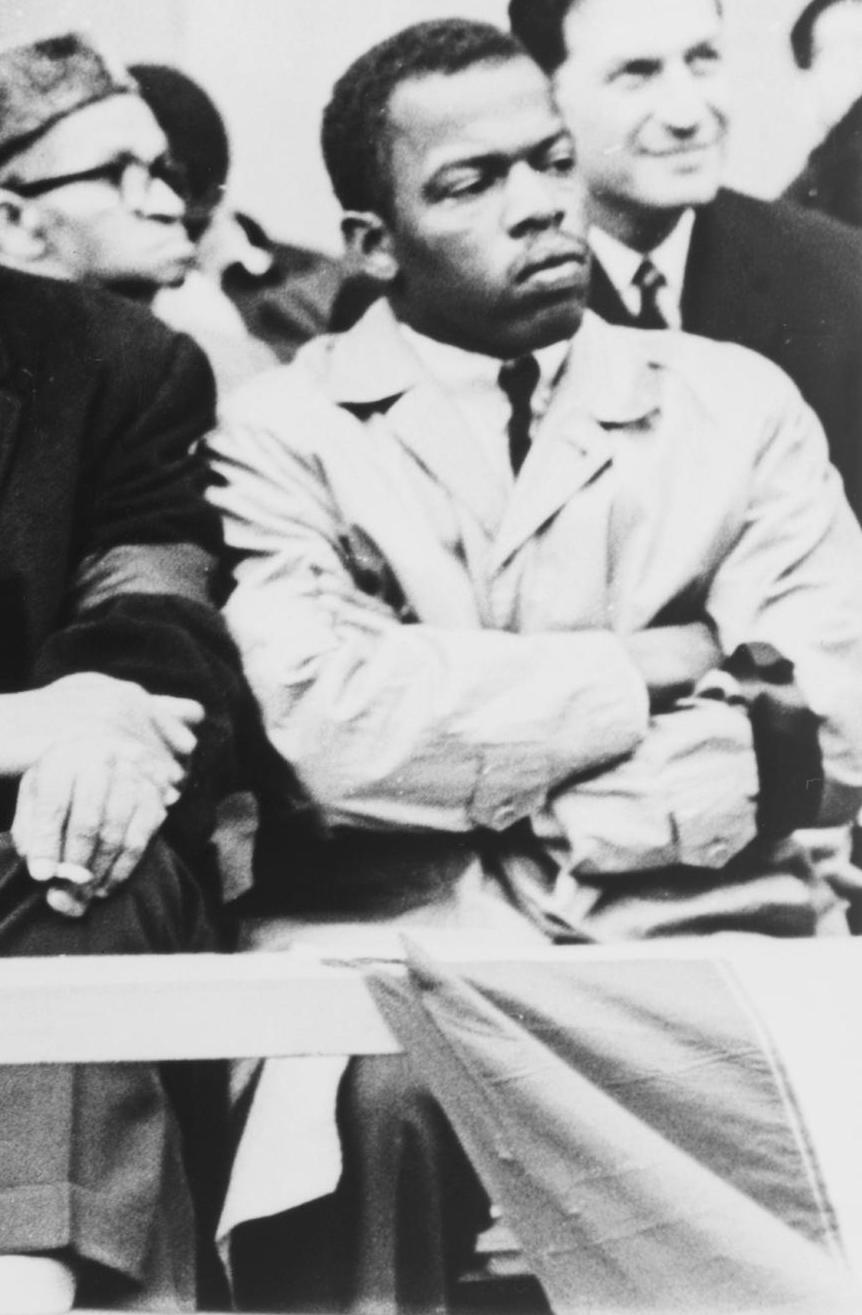
The sculpture depicted John Lewis (pictured 1965) wearing a trench coat, as he appeared during the Selma to Montgomery marches.

The monument consists of a life-size bronze sculpture of John Lewis. His appearance is similar to how he looked during the Selma to Montgomery marches during the civil rights movement, and he is wearing a trench coat as he did during the events of "Bloody Sunday" on March 7, 1965.

== History ==
John Lewis was a civil rights activist and politician. He was born in Troy, Alabama, approximately 50 miles (80 kilometers) from Birmingham, in 1940. During the civil rights movement, he was involved in several major campaigns, including the Freedom Rides and the 1965 Selma to Montgomery marches. Later, he served in the United States House of Representatives from 1987 until his death in 2020.

The monument, called Steadfast Stride Toward Justice, was designed by Basil Watson, a sculptor based in Atlanta. It was installed in Legacy Plaza, across the street from The Legacy Museum, which is operated by the Equal Justice Initiative. The museum and plaza are near the Alabama State Capitol in downtown Birmingham, which served as the end point for the Selma to Montgomery march. Lewis had previously spoke at the opening ceremony for the museum in 2018.

The statue was dedicated on November 12, 2024, becoming the first life-size statue of Lewis in his home state of Alabama. About 100 people attended the ceremony, which included several elected officials, members of Lewis's family, and the sculptor's designer, Watson. The event featured a singing of "Stand Up" followed by statements from Bryan Stevenson (the founder and chief executive officer of the Equal Justice Initiative), Lewis's nephew Jerrick, and Detria Austin Everson (the chief executive officer of The John and Lillian Miles Lewis Foundation). The event concluded with an unveiling of the statue, which had been covered in a large drape. The statue joined two other statues, depicting civil rights activists Martin Luther King Jr. and Rosa Parks, that had been dedicated in the plaza earlier in the year. These two had also been designed by Watson.

== See also ==
- 2024 in art
- Civil rights movement in popular culture
- John Lewis Memorial - Another statue of John Lewis designed by Basil Watson, in Decatur, Georgia
