= Statue of John Lewis (Atlanta) =

Sculpture in Atlanta, Georgia, U.S.

- Artist: Gregory Johnson
- Year: 2021
- Subject: John Lewis
- Dimensions: 3.7 m cm (12 ft in)
- Location: Rodney Cook Sr. Park, Vine City, Atlanta, Georgia, US
- Owner: City of Atlanta

A statue of civil rights movement leader and politician John Lewis, by sculptor Gregory Johnson. Located in Rodney Cook Sr. Park, in Vine City, Atlanta, Georgia, it stands at 12 feet (3.7 m) tall. It was installed on July 7, 2021, and Atlanta mayor Keisha Lance Bottoms and former mayor and civil rights activist Andrew Young attended the opening ceremony.

== See also ==
- Civil rights movement in popular culture
