= Basil Watson =

Jamaican sculptor (born 1958)

The Honourable Basil Watson OJ CD
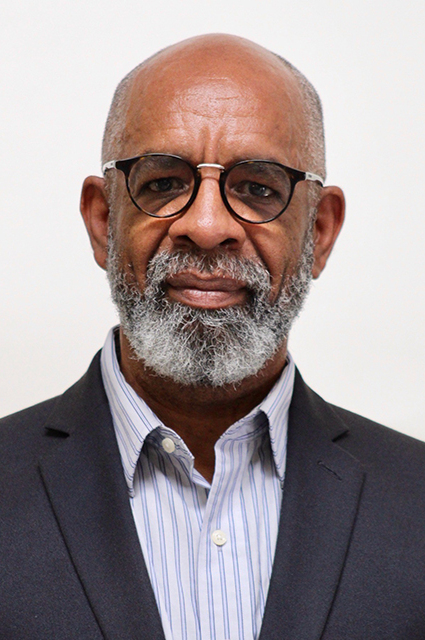
- Born: Basil Barrington Watson; 1958 (age 67–68)
- Education: Edna Manley College of the Visual and Performing Arts
- Known for: Sculpting
- Notable work: Famous People: Merlene Ottey; Usain Bolt; Martin Luther King Jr.; Louise Bennett-Coverley; Rosa Parks; Herb McKenley; George Headley
- Movement: Realism
- Spouse: Donna Watson
- Children: 3

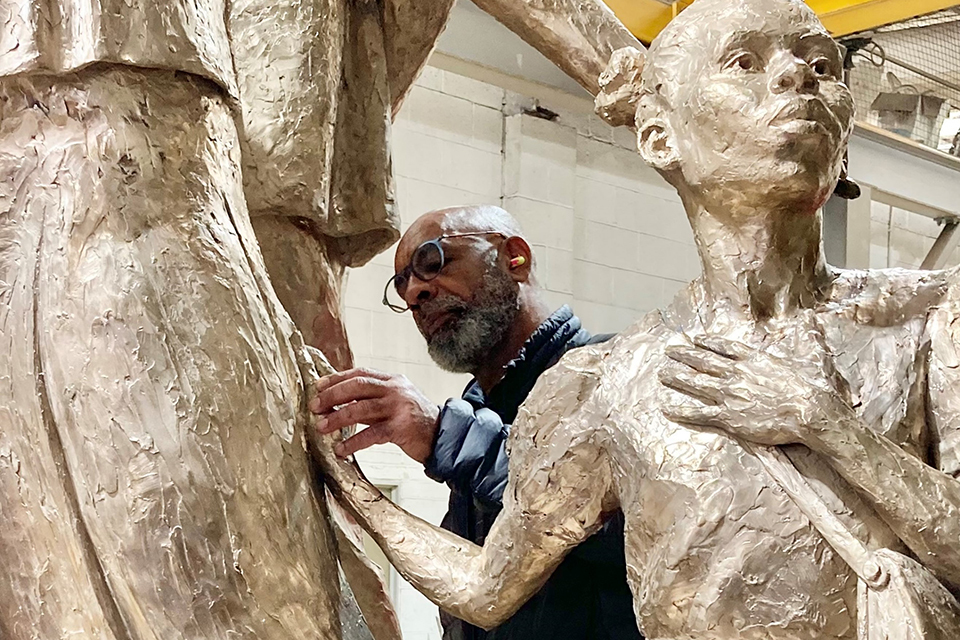
Watson with the National Windrush Monument

Basil Watson OJ CD (born 1958) is a Jamaican sculptor.

He is the son of painter Barrington Watson, and the brother of sculptor Raymond Watson. He was honoured with the Order of Distinction, Commander Class, in 2016, in recognition of his artistic accomplishments.

Watson completed a sculpture entitled Balance in November 2006, which was installed at Doctor's Cave Bathing Club in Montego Bay in honor of the club's centennial. Meant to depict the harmony between man and woman, the sculpture is of a standing nude man with one arm outstretched over his head and an inverted nude woman balancing on one hand, with her hand supported by the man's upraised hand. In total, it is 15 feet tall.

In December of that same year, he completed a statue of sprinter Merlene Ottey, which was installed at Jamaica's National Stadium. The bronze sculpture, which is eight feet tall and weighs seven hundred pounds, depicts a running Ottey reaching for the sky with her right hand. Prime Minister P. J. Patterson presided over the statue's dedication.

Another work of Watson's was added to National Stadium in November 2009, when Prime Minister Bruce Golding unveiled his sculpture of sprinter Herb McKenley. Watson described the task as an "honour" and a "privilege", citing the esteem in which he held McKenley. He said that when designing the work, he drew from multiple images of McKenley created at different times to bridge the gap between McKenley's youthful accomplishments and his popular renown in his old age.

Works by both Basil Watson and his son Kai, a painter, were exhibited in New York at the fifth annual "Art Off the Main" exposition in October 2008, sponsored by the Savacou Gallery.

That December, Watson was added to the list of artists invited to provide works for the National Gallery of Jamaica's National Biennial exhibition.

He was chosen from four finalists to create the United Kingdom's National Windrush Monument, which was unveiled at London Waterloo station in June 2022.

On August 16, 2024, a 12-foot statue of John Lewis by Watson was installed in Decatur, Georgia, in the place where an obelisk monument to the Confederacy was put by the United Daughters of the Confederacy in 1908; the obelisk was removed in 2020. That same year, Steadfast Stride Toward Justice, another statue of Lewis designed by Watson, was installed in Montgomery, Alabama.

On June 19, 2025, a 10 foot statue of Lewis and Harriet Hayden was unveiled outside Lexington Traditional Magnet School in Lexington, Kentucky. The statue, named "Towards Freedom", faces north to symbolize the direction escaped slaves traveled on the Underground Railroad.
