= The Problem We All Live With =

1964 painting by Norman Rockwell

- Artist: Norman Rockwell
- Year: 1964
- Dimensions: 91 cm × 150 cm (36 in × 58 in)
- Location: Norman Rockwell Museum

The Problem We All Live With is a 1964 painting by Norman Rockwell that is considered an iconic image of the civil rights movement in the United States. It depicts Ruby Bridges, a six-year-old African-American girl, on her way to William Frantz Elementary School, an all-white public school, on November 14, 1960, during the New Orleans school desegregation crisis. Because of threats of violence against her, she is escorted by four deputy U.S. marshals; the painting is framed so that the marshals' heads are cropped at the shoulders, making Bridges the only person fully visible. On the wall behind her, the acronym of the Ku Klux Klan (KKK) and the racial slur "nigger" are scrawled; a smashed and splattered tomato thrown against the wall is also visible. The white protesters are not visible, as the viewer is looking at the scene from their point of view. The painting is oil on canvas and measures 36 inches (91 cm) high by 58 inches (150 cm) wide.

== History ==
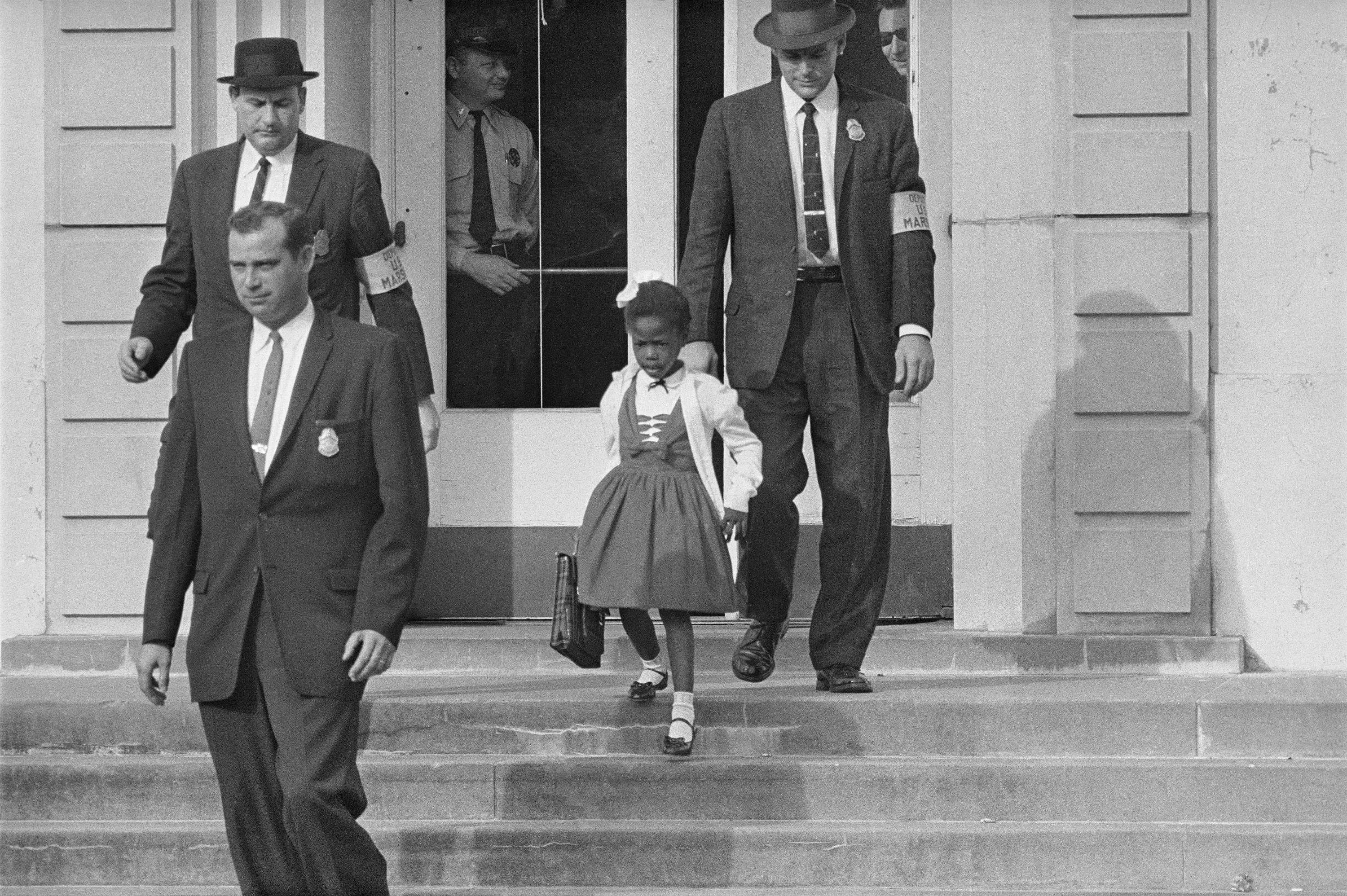
Ruby Bridges with US Marshals in 1960

The painting was originally published as a centerfold in the January 14, 1964, issue of Look. Rockwell had ended his contract with The Saturday Evening Post the previous year due to frustration with the limits the magazine placed on his expression of political themes, and Look offered him a forum for his social interests, including civil rights and racial integration. Rockwell explored similar themes in Murder in Mississippi and New Kids in the Neighborhood; unlike his previous works for the Post, The Problem We All Live With and these others place Black people as featured protagonists, instead of as observers, part of group scenes, or in servile roles. Like New Kids in the Neighborhood, The Problem We All Live With depicts a Black child protagonist; like Southern Justice, it uses strong light-dark contrasts to further its racial theme.

While the subject of the painting was inspired by Ruby Bridges, Rockwell used a local girl, Lynda Gunn, as the model for his painting; her cousin, Anita Gunn, was also used. One of the marshals was modelled by William Obanhein.

== Reception ==
After the work was published, Rockwell received "sacks of disapproving mail", one letter accusing him of being a race traitor.

Bridges herself never met Rockwell, but as an adult expressed admiration for Rockwell's courage in creating the painting. "Here was a man that had been doing lots of work, painting family images, and all of a sudden decided this is what I'm going to do...it's wrong, and I'm going to say that it's wrong...the mere fact that [Norman Rockwell] had enough courage to step up to the plate and say I'm going to make a statement, and he did it in a very powerful way...even though I had not had an opportunity to meet him, I commend him for that."

== Legacy ==
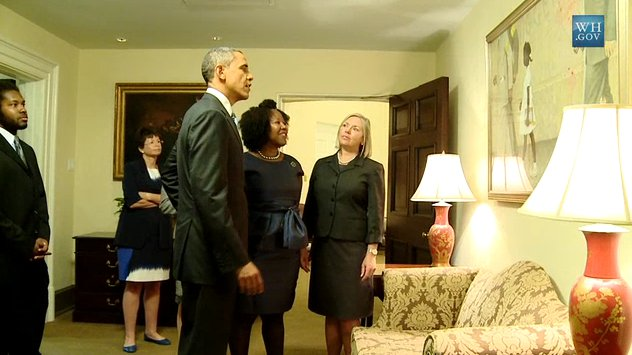
Ruby Bridges and President Barack Obama view the painting in the White House. (video)

At Bridges' suggestion, President Barack Obama had the painting installed in the White House, in a hallway outside the Oval Office, from July to October 2011. Art historian William Kloss stated, "The N-word there – it sure stops you. There's a realistic reason for having the graffiti as a slur, [but] it's also right in the middle of the painting. It's a painting that could not be hung even for a brief time in the public spaces [of the White House]. I'm pretty sure of that." Bridges and Obama viewed the painting together on July 15, 2011, and he told her, "I think it's fair to say that if it hadn't been for you guys, I might not be here and we wouldn't be looking at this together."

A copy of the painting was used to "dress" O. J. Simpson's house during his 1995 murder trial by defense attorney Johnnie Cochran. Cochran hoped to evoke the sympathy of visiting jurors, who were mostly black, by including "something depicting African-American history."

== See also ==
- Art in the White House
- Civil rights movement in popular culture
- Desegregated public schools in New Orleans
- McDonogh Three
- Ruby Bridges, 1998 film
- Trying to Trash Betsy DeVos
