= Penelope Ann Miller =

American actress (born 1964)

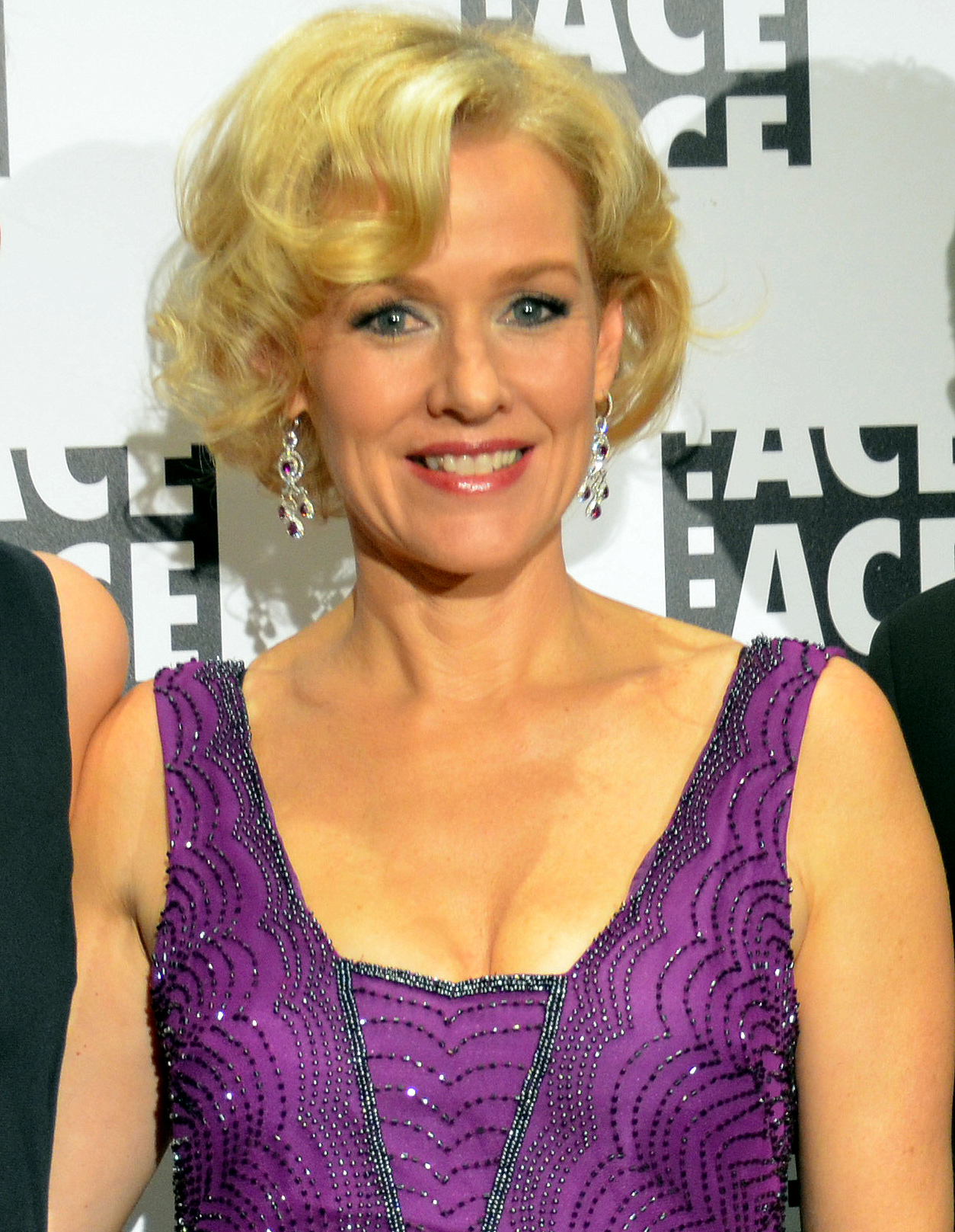
- Miller in 2012
- Born: Penelope Andrea Miller; January 13, 1964 (age 62); Los Angeles, California, U.S.
- Other name: Penelope Miller
- Occupation: Actress
- Years active: 1985–present
- Spouses: Will Arnett (m. 1994; div. 1995); James Huggins (m. 2000)
- Children: 2
- Father: Mark Miller

Penelope Ann Miller (born Penelope Andrea Miller, January 13, 1964), sometimes credited as Penelope Miller, is an American actress. She began her career on Broadway in the original run of Biloxi Blues (1985–1986), later appearing in the 1988 film adaptation of the same name. After playing small roles in the comedies Adventures in Babysitting (1987) and Big Top Pee-wee (1988), and receiving a Tony Award nomination for her leading role in the Broadway revival of Our Town (1988–1989), Miller came to prominence with a succession of major parts in films such as The Freshman, Awakenings, Kindergarten Cop (all 1990), Other People's Money (1991), Chaplin (1992), The Shadow (1994), and The Relic (1997). For her portrayal of exotic dancer Gail in Carlito's Way (1993), she was nominated for the Golden Globe Award for Best Supporting Actress.

Other film credits include Along Came a Spider (2001), The Messengers (2007), The Artist (2011), The Birth of a Nation (2016), and Reagan (2024). On television, Miller starred as Molly Hooper on the Fox sitcom A Minute with Stan Hooper (2003–2004), played recurring roles on Men of a Certain Age (2009–2011) and Mistresses (2013–2014), starred as Eve Carlin on the first season of ABC's American Crime (2015), and co-starred as Joyce Dahmer in the Netflix series Monster: The Jeffrey Dahmer Story (2022).

== Early life ==
Miller was born in Los Angeles, California, to Beatrice (née Ammidown), a costume designer, publicist, and journalist, and Mark Miller, a television actor and producer. Her mother was the goddaughter of businessman Aristotle Onassis and an editor of Harper's Bazaar. She has two sisters: older, Marisa Miller, who is also a film actress, and younger, Savannah Miller, a social worker.

Miller graduated from high school in Los Angeles and attended Menlo College in Atherton, California, for two years from 1981 to 1983, then moved to New York City to study theatre at HB Studio.

== Career ==
Her Broadway theatre break came in 1985 when she was cast in the lead (opposite Matthew Broderick) in the Neil Simon play Biloxi Blues. (She also starred with Broderick in the 1988 film version of that play). She played a role in one episode ("Death and the Lady") of the television series Miami Vice (which aired on October 16, 1987), and accepted several other small roles in film and television work. She then returned to Broadway in a revival of Our Town; her portrayal of Emily garnered her a Tony Award nomination. She then appeared as Pee-wee Herman's (Paul Reubens) fiancée, Winnie Johnston, in the 1988 release of Big Top Pee-wee. She played a supporting role in 1989's Dead Bang, a cop thriller starring Don Johnson.

In 1990, she played Paula in Awakenings, starring Robert De Niro and Robin Williams. She also appeared in the 1990 movies Downtown, with Anthony Edwards and Forest Whitaker, and Kindergarten Cop, alongside Arnold Schwarzenegger, playing a teacher, hiding with her son Dominic from her criminal drug-dealing husband Cullen Crisp (Richard Tyson). She subsequently appeared in a number of other theatrical movies, notably as Edna Purviance in Chaplin and with Tim Daly as Margaret "Maggie" Harwood in Peter Yates' film Year of the Comet, both in 1992, and the following year she appeared as the love interest of Al Pacino's character in Carlito's Way.

Miller co-starred as the daughter of the character played by Marlon Brando in 1990's The Freshman, again opposite Matthew Broderick, and as the lawyer and stepdaughter of the character played by Gregory Peck in 1991's Other People's Money. She appeared as Margo Lane in The Shadow with Alec Baldwin, as well as in the film Miles from Home directed by Gary Sinise. She had the lead role in the big-budget creature feature The Relic (1997) as Dr. Margo Green. In 1998, she portrayed Barbara Henry in Ruby Bridges a made-for-television movie that was made by Disney, about Ruby Bridges, the first Black student to attend an all-white elementary school in New Orleans. In 2000, she played Mary Kay Letourneau in the TV film All-American Girl: The Mary Kay Letourneau Story.

In 2002, Miller starred in the film Dead in a Heartbeat and in a two-part episode of A&E's series A Nero Wolfe Mystery. Her 2005 film Funny Money was voted the top film of the Sarasota Film Festival. She appeared in the Fox series Vanished for six episodes, playing the ex-wife of a U.S. senator whose wife has mysteriously disappeared. In 2007, she appeared in the comedy Blonde Ambition co-starring Jessica Simpson and Luke Wilson. She guest starred as Fran on Desperate Housewives. Miller appeared in the horror film The Messengers, co-starring Dylan McDermott and Kristen Stewart. The film was produced by director Sam Raimi's production company, Ghost House Pictures. In 2011, she portrayed Doris, the wife of protagonist George Valentin (Jean Dujardin), in the Academy Award-winning film The Artist.

After a recurring role on the ABC soap opera Mistresses, Miller was cast in 2015 as a regular in the first season of ABC's drama series American Crime.

In October 2020, Miller was cast as First Lady Nancy Reagan in Reagan, a biographical film based on the life of President Ronald Reagan. Reagan was theatrically released in the United States on August 30, 2024. For her performance in the film, she and Dennis Quaid were nominated for a Golden Raspberry Award for Worst Screen Combo at the 45th Golden Raspberry Awards.

== Personal life ==
In 1994, Miller married actor Will Arnett. They divorced in 1995.

Miller married James Huggins in 2000, and they have two daughters. On March 14, 2012, Miller filed for legal separation from Huggins after 12 years of marriage. On June 15, 2012, Miller withdrew her request for separation.

== Filmography ==
Key
†	Denotes projects that have not yet been released

=== Film ===
Year	Title	Role	Notes
1987	Hotshot	Mary	Film debut
1987	Adventures in Babysitting	Brenda	
1988	Biloxi Blues	Daisy Hannigan	
1988	Big Top Pee-wee	Winnie Johnson	
1988	Miles from Home	Sally	
1989	Dead Bang	Linda Kimble	
1990	Downtown	Lori Mitchell	
1990	The Freshman	Tina Sabatini	
1990	Awakenings	Paula	
1990	Kindergarten Cop	Joyce Palmieri / Rachel Crisp	
1991	Other People's Money	Kate Sullivan	
1992	Year of the Comet	Margaret Harwood	
1992	The Gun in Betty Lou's Handbag	Mrs. Elizabeth Louise "Betty Lou" Perkins	
1992	Chaplin	Edna Purviance	
1993	Carlito's Way	Gail	
1994	The Shadow	Margo Lane	
1997	The Hired Heart	Garnet Hadley	
1997	The Relic	Dr. Margo Green	
1997	Little City	Rebecca	
1998	Break Up	Grace	
1998	Outside Ozona	Earlene Demers	
1999	Chapter Zero	Cassandra	
2000	Lisa Picard Is Famous	Penelope Ann Miller	
2000	Forever Lulu	Claire Clifton	
2001	Along Came a Spider	Elizabeth Rose	
2001	Full Disclosure	Michelle	Video
2006	Funny Money	Carol Perkins	
2007	The Messengers	Denise Solomon	
2007	The Deal	Laura Martin	
2007	Blonde Ambition	Debra	
2008	Free Style	Jeannette Bryant	
2009	Saving Grace B. Jones	Bea Bretthorst	
2010	Flipped	Trina Baker	
2011	The Artist	Doris Valentin	
2011	About Sunny	Louise	
2013	Saving Lincoln	Mary Todd Lincoln	
2013	Robosapien: Rebooted	Joanna Keller	
2016	The Birth of a Nation	Elizabeth Turner	
2016	The Bronx Bull	Debbie Forrester	
2018	American Dresser	Vera	
2020	Adverse	Nicole	
2024	Reagan	Nancy Reagan	
2024	Murder at Hollow Creek	Lori Rhodes	

=== Television films ===
Year	Title	Role	Notes
1988	Tales from Hollywood Hills: Closed Set	Tina	
1994	Witch Hunt	Kim Hudson	
1997	The Last Don	Nalene De Lena	
1997	The Hired Heart	Garnet Hadley	
1997	Merry Christmas, George Bailey	Mary Hatch Bailey	
1998	Rhapsody in Bloom	Lilah Bloom	
1998	Ruby Bridges	Barbara Henry	
1999	Rocky Marciano	Barbara Cousins	
2000	All-American Girl: The Mary Kay Letourneau Story	Mary Kay Letourneau	
2000	Killing Moon	Laura Chadwick	
2001	Dodson's Journey	Meredith Dodson	
2001	A Woman's a Helluva Thing	Zane Douglas	
2002	Dead in a Heartbeat	Dr. Gillian Hayes	
2002	Scared Silent	Kathy Clifson	
2003	Rudy: The Rudy Giuliani Story	Donna Hanover	
2003	National Lampoon's Thanksgiving Family Reunion	Pauline Snider	
2004	Carry Me Home	Harriet	
2005	Personal Effects	Bonnie Locke	
2008	The Deadliest Lesson	Gloria	
2017	NY Prison Break: The Seduction of Joyce Mitchell	Joyce Mitchell	
2019	The College Admissions Scandal	Caroline DeVere	
2026	Ms. Berviltuck and the Children	Ms. Berviltuck	

=== Television series ===
Year	Title	Role	Notes
1985	Tales from the Darkside	Keena	Episode: "Ring Around the Redhead"
1987	The Facts of Life	Kristen Morgan	Episode: "The Greek Connection"
1987	Family Ties	Joyce	Episode: "Higher Love"
1987	The Popcorn Kid	Gwen Stottlemeyer	6 episodes
1987	Miami Vice	Jill Ryder	Episode: "Death and the Lady"
1987	St. Elsewhere	Laurel	Episode: "Ewe Can't Go Home Again"
1989	Great Performances	Emily Webb	Episode: "Our Town"
1991	Morton & Hayes	Jody	Episode: "The Bride of Mummula"
1997	The Last Don	Nalene De Lena	Episode: "#1.1"
1998	The Closer	Erica Hewitt	10 episodes
2002	A Nero Wolfe Mystery	Lucy Valdon	2 episodes
2003–2004	A Minute with Stan Hooper	Molly Hooper	13 episodes
2005	CSI: NY	Rose Whitley	Episode: "What You See Is What You Get"
2005	Desperate Housewives	Fran Ferrara	Episode: "Coming Home"
2006	Vanished	Jessica Nevins	9 episodes
2009–2011	Men of a Certain Age	Sonia Tranelli	9 episodes
2013–2014	Mistresses	Elizabeth Grey	10 episodes
2015	American Crime	Eve Carlin	10 episodes
2018	Riverdale	Ms. Wright	1 episode
2018	Criminal Minds	Dr. Elizabeth Rhodes	1 episode
2022	Dahmer – Monster: The Jeffrey Dahmer Story	Joyce Dahmer	10 episodes

== Awards and nominations ==
Year	Award	Category	Nominated work	Result
1991	Chicago Film Critics Association	Most Promising Actress	The Freshman	Won
1994	Golden Globe Awards	Best Supporting Actress – Motion Picture	Carlito's Way	Nominated
1995	Saturn Awards	Best Actress	The Shadow	Nominated
1997	Saturn Awards	Best Actress	The Relic	Nominated
1998	Hollywood Film Awards	Special Jury Award for Best Acting in a Feature	Rhapsody in Bloom	Won
2001	DVD Exclusive Awards	Best Supporting Actress	Full Disclosure	Nominated
2012	Gold Derby Awards	Best Ensemble Cast	The Artist	Nominated
2012	Screen Actors Guild Awards	Outstanding Performance by a Cast in a Motion Picture	The Artist	Nominated
2016	Satellite Awards	Best Ensemble – Television Series	American Crime	Won
2024	San Diego International Film Festival	Gregory Peck Award	Lifetime Achievement	Awarded
2025	Golden Raspberry Awards	Worst Screen Combo (shared with Dennis Quaid)	Reagan	Nominated
