= McDonogh Three =

Students who desegregated a New Orleans public school in 1960

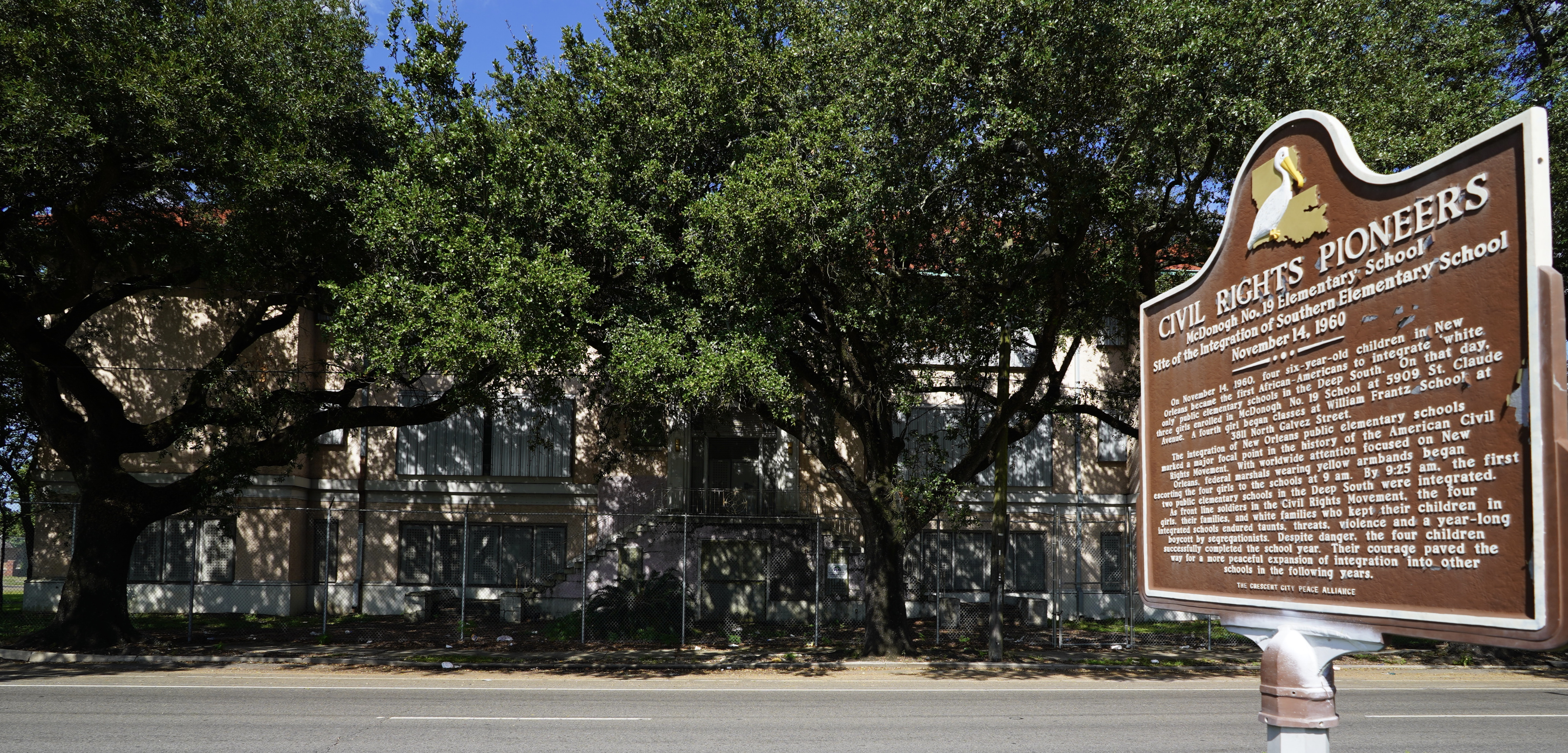
McDonogh 19 Elementary School

The McDonogh Three is a nickname for three African-American students who desegregated McDonogh 19 Elementary School, in New Orleans on November 14, 1960. Even though school segregation had been illegal since the Brown v. Board of Education decision in 1954, no states in the American Deep South had taken action to integrate their schools.

The McDonogh Three were Leona Tate, Gail Etienne, and Tessie Prevost, girls who had all previously attended black-only schools in the lower 9th Ward of New Orleans, a neighborhood segregated by block. Then, on November 14, 1960, the students arrived at McDonogh No. 19, a previously segregated all-white school, escorted by United States Marshals wearing yellow armbands to enact school integration. The desegregation was met with violent protests and many precautions had to be taken to protect the students. That same morning, a 6-year-old girl named Ruby Bridges integrated a second New Orleans public school, William Frantz Elementary. Bridges and the McDonogh Three are collectively known as the New Orleans Four.

== Political events for integration ==
During the 20th century, there were a series of political advancements that contributed to the integration of public schools in the United States. In 1950, in the McLaurin v. Oklahoma State Regents, public schools in America were forbidden from discriminating against students because of their race. In 1952, A.P. Tureaud, a member of the New Orleans Attorney, with help from Thurgood Marshall and Robert Carter from the Legal Defense and Educational Fund of the NAACP, acted on behalf of black parents to end segregation of New Orleans' schools. They charged New Orleans that the state's public school system was unconstitutional and violated the 14th amendment.

In 1954, the Supreme Court case Brown v. Board of Education became the most impactful decision concerning the integration of public schools in America, and ironically happened in the birth year of The New Orleans Four. The syllabus from this case said: "Segregation of white and negro children in the public schools of a State solely on the basis of race, pursuant to state laws permitting or requiring such segregation, denies to Negro children the equal protection of the laws guaranteed by the Fourteenth Amendment – even though the physical facilities and other "tangible" factors of white and Negro schools may be equal." This case outlined that the doctrines that had previously been established in Plessy v. Ferguson (1896) were unconstitutional and must be eliminated from public education.

Finally, in February 1956, Judge J. Skelly Wright formally issued an order for the Orleans Parish School Board to desegregate its schools, and in 1960 he approved a plan to do this. He ordered integration to start on the third Monday in November 1960.

== White resistance and protest ==
These court decisions, new laws and political statements caused uproar in the white community, many of whom thought blacks were inferior to whites and should be educated in a separate facility.

The Louisiana Pupil Placement Law demonstrated white society's views on segregated education, and how they wanted to prohibit black children from being in the same school as white children. This law created a board of officials that had the authority to assign students to the school they would attend in their state. This meant that all black students would be assigned to a separate school from the white students, and the majority of these schools would be in much worse condition than the white-only schools. When the Federal Government finally forced the New Orleans' public school system to desegregate its schools, the Pupil Placement Board created an admissions test that black students had to pass to attend a school with white children. This test was intentionally very challenging and was made to limit the amount of applicants able to integrate the schools, which is why only four girls were able to attend McDonogh N.19 and William Frantz in 1960. The Orleans Parish School Board was eventually forced to abolish the Pupil Placement Law and expand integration, but again, it is an example of how the State Government worked around the Federal Government's orders to prevent African-American integration.

White discrimination continued for more than five years after racially segregated schools became illegal under Brown v. Board of Education. Southern states had done nothing to integrate schools, and Negro schools were even being closed down. After a poll taken in 1959, 78% of white parents voted to continue segregated schools, and the Orleans Parish School Board declared it would only consider the opinions of the whites.

White resistance was also shown when the US District Court finally forced the school board to apply integration. The protesters blocked tax money and paychecks going to integrated schools, and school boards even shut down. In addition, the members of the Orleans Parish School Board who had voted for integration were fired on the morning of November 16, and the White Citizens Council marched to the school board shouting: "Two, four, six, eight, we don't want to integrate." These examples show the discontent of society and the state government when the schools were integrated in 1960.

Although the majority of white society protested against integration, there were some who supported the African-Americans' cause. For example, in 1960, a group of white women led by Rosa Keller and Gladys Kahn formed a protest assembly called Save Our Schools (SOS) to keep schools open under desegregation. This party grew up to 1500 members, and effectively produced newsletters, gained support of local officials, and advertised in all parts of the media to encourage integration.

== Integration ==
On November 14, 1960, Leona Tate, Gail Etienne and Tessie Prevost, along with Ruby Bridges, were escorted by Federal Marshals to be the first African Americans to attend formerly white-only schools in New Orleans.

=== McDonogh No.19 ===
Leona Tate, Gail Etienne and Tessie Prevost arrived at McDonogh No. 19 Elementary School to see police holding back the screaming and protesting crowds. When the girls walked into the school, they saw a room filled with their future classmates, but within a few minutes, they were all taken away by worried parents, and for the next two years, Leona Tate, Gail Etienne, and Tessie Prevost were the only students attending McDonogh No. 19. Although these girls received attention and a proper education from their teachers during these years, the majority of the public was not happy with the integration. Throughout the school year, yelling crowds surrounded McDonogh No.19 protesting against the enrollment of the three girls (Leona Tate, Gail Etienne and Tessie Prevost). The girls were constantly guarded by US Officials, classroom windows were covered with brown paper, and the girls had to have recess in the school theatre because the school yard was too dangerous. The water fountains inside the school were even shut off to protect the girls from poisoning. For third grade, Gail Etienne, Leona Tate and Tessie Prevost desegregated a second elementary school, T.J. Semmes Elementary School, along with twenty other black students. This time, there were no US Marshals to protect the children. The girls and the other black students endured physically violent treatment and severe bullying. In the fourth grade, Leona Tate left T.J. Semmes Elementary to join Ruby Bridges at William Frantz Elementary, and then went on to integrate Kohn Middle School. Tessie Prevost and Gail Etienne went to a black-segregated middle school called Rivers Frederick, and for high school Tessie Prevost continued to Joseph S. Clark, another color-segregated school where she discovered her musical talent. Gail Etienne, Ruby Bridges and Leona Tate had one last school to integrate, and attended Francis T. Nicholls High when the school mascot was the Confederate Rebels; this was another huge challenge as this school had no civil rights experience.

== Legacy ==
November 14, 2010, marked the 50th anniversary of the desegregation of public schools in New Orleans. The Plessy & Ferguson Foundation, the Crescent City Peace Alliance, the Leona Tate Foundation for Change, the Institute for Civil Rights, and the Social Justice Committee joined with the community to honor the families of the Marshals who escorted the girls, along with Leona Tate, Gail Etienne and Tessie Prevost themselves.

The Leona Tate Foundation for Change and the Plessy & Ferguson Foundation are planned to create a memorial site to remember the brave actions of the four brave 6-year-old girls, that was scheduled to open on November 14, 2012.

November 14, 2020, marked the 60th anniversary of school desegregation. District E City Councilwoman Cyndi Nguyen brought forth the resolution to honor The New Orleans Four. The City Council of New Orleans voted unanimously to proclaim November 14 New Orleans Four Day. The City hosted and outdoor Proclamation Day Ceremony at Gallier Hall (during the third phase of the COVID-19 pandemic shutdown). On that day, the City Council of New Orleans officially proclaimed November 14 New Orleans Four Day and all four Civil Rights Pioneers received the long-awaited Key to the city from the office of Mayor LaToya Cantrell.

== See also ==
- Desegregated public schools in New Orleans
