= Toni Ann Johnson =

American screenwriter, playwright, and novelist

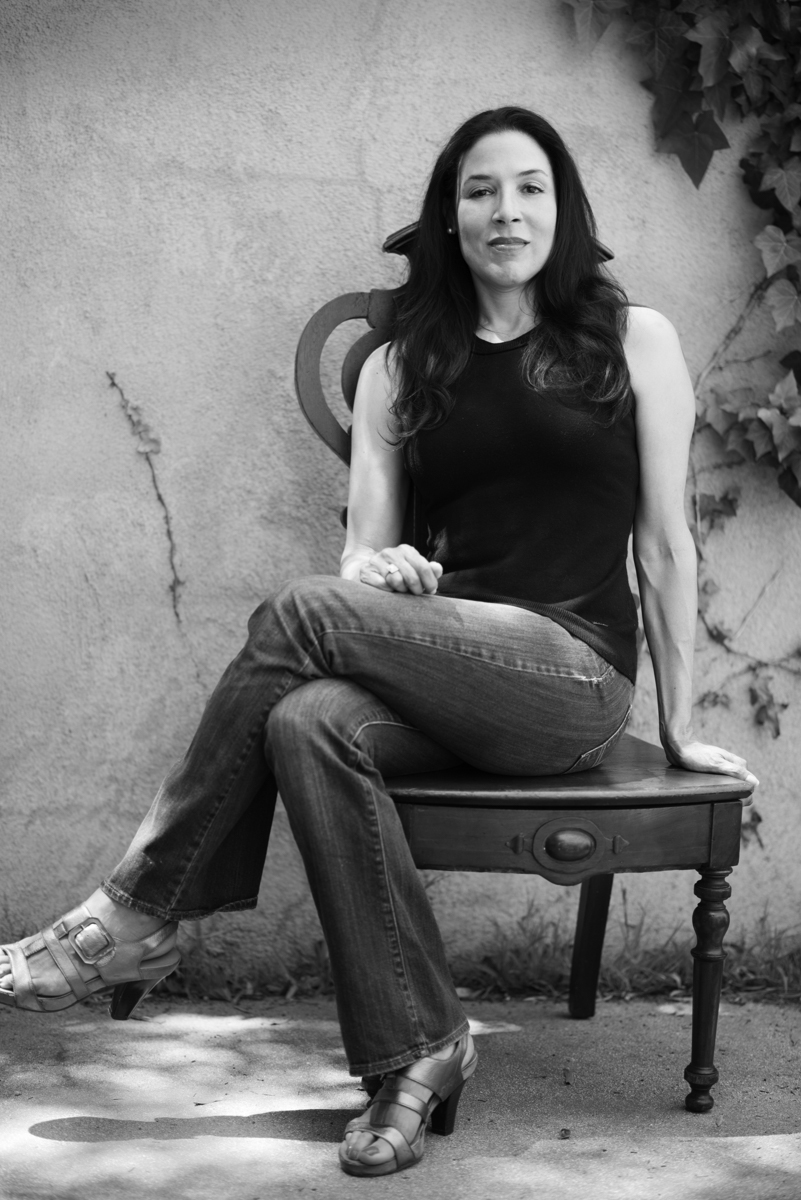
American author and screenwriter Toni Ann Johnson

Toni Ann Johnson is an American screenwriter, playwright, and novelist.

== Early life and education ==
Toni Ann Johnson grew up in Monroe, New York, and the Greenwich Village area of New York City. During high school, she was a student at the Lee Strasberg Theatre Institute in New York City. She is the daughter of Bill Johnson and sister of Hillary Johnson. She graduated from New York University's Tisch School of the Arts. She also attended City College of New York, where she studied playwriting with Arthur Kopit. Johnson received a certificate in Cinema from Los Angeles City College and an MFA in creative writing from Antioch University Los Angeles.

== Career ==
From 1989 to 1990, Johnson was a contributing writer (along with Jewel Brimage, Ellen Cleghorne, Cheryl Lane, Leslie Lee and Zelda Patterson) to the play Here in My Father's House, produced Off Broadway by The Negro Ensemble Company at the Lambs Theater and later at Theatre Four.

In June 1994, Johnson was selected as a participant for the Sundance Screenwriters Lab to adapt her stage play Gramercy Park Is Closed to the Public. Johnson's play Gramercy Park Is Closed to the Public was produced in the summer of 1994 by The Fountainhead Theatre Company in Los Angeles at The Hudson Theatre. It was also presented as a staged reading as part of The Ensemble Studio Theatre Company's “Octoberfest” in October 1994. The play centers on the life of an upper-middle-class woman of mixed race and her romantic relationship with a white cop in her New York City neighborhood. The story explores complexities of race and class. Gramercy Park Is Closed to the Public was produced by The New York Stage and Film Company in 1999 as a mainstage production and as part of its summer Powerhouse Theatre at Vassar College in Poughkeepsie, NY. It starred Nicole Ari Parker, David Warshofky and Eddie Cahill.

Johnson wrote the screenplay for the ABC television movie Ruby Bridges. The film is based on the life of Ruby Nell Bridges, who in 1960, integrated the New Orleans public school system when she was six years old. Ruby Bridges premiered on ABC in January 1998.

In 2000, Johnson wrote the film The Courage to Love for Lifetime Television. The film is loosely based on the life of Henriette Delille, a free woman of color in mid-19th century New Orleans, who founded one of the first orders of nuns of African descent, The Sisters of the Holy Family.

In 2001, Johnson was hired by Robert Cort and David Madden to write a pilot based on the feature film Save the Last Dance. The pilot was produced for Fox Television in 2002.

Johnson wrote the 2004 film Crown Heights for Showtime Television. The story focuses on a hip hop group that is composed of African-American and Hasidic Jewish members. The group formed in the wake of the Brooklyn Crown Heights riots of 1991.

Johnson co-wrote the second installment of the Step Up franchise, Step Up 2: The Streets.

Johnson's short stories have been published in various print journals: Fiction (2023), ACCOLADES: A Women Who Submit Anthology (2020) Callaloo (2019), Xavier Review (2016), Hunger Mountain (2016), Soundings Review (2014), Emerson Review (2013) and The Elohi Gadugi Journal (2013). Her work has also been published in the online journals Serving House: A Journal of Literary Arts, Red Fez, Arlijo VIDA Review, The Coachella Review, and Aunt Chloe's Journal.

In October 2021 Johnson won the Flannery O'Connor Award for her linked story collection Light Skin Gone to Waste.

In 2014, Johnson's debut novel Remedy for a Broken Angel was released via Nortia Press. The book features a Bermudian protagonist and was inspired by Johnson's strong ties to the island. Kirkus Reviews praised Remedy for a Broken Angel, writing, "Johnson writes with sensitivity and a good ear for dialogue. She is both musically and psychologically acute, showing a solid understanding of the subtlety and flamboyance of narcissism. Her view of forgiveness is multilayered, and her characters’ mostly mixed-race status adds an interesting dimension to their experiences.”

In February 2026, Johnson's second linked story collection, But Where's Home? was published by Screen Door Press, after winning the inaugural Screen Door Press Prize in 2024.

== Awards ==
Johnson won the 1998 Humanitas Prize and the 1998 Christopher Award for her script Ruby Bridges.

In 2004, Johnson won a second Humanitas Prize for her script Crown Heights.

Johnson was nominated for a 2015 NAACP Image Award for Outstanding Literary Work – Debut Author.

Remedy for a Broken Angel also won a 2015 International Latino Book Award for Most Inspirational Fiction Book.

In 2020 Johnson's novella Homegoing won Accents Publishing's inaugural novella contest.

Johnson won the 2021 Flannery O'Connor Award for short fiction for her linked short story collection Light Skin Gone to Waste.

Light Skin Gone to Waste was nominated for a 2023 NAACP Image Award for Outstanding Literary Work – Fiction and shortlisted for the 2024 Saroyan Prize.

In 2024, Johnson was selected by Crystal Wilkinson as the winner of the inaugural Screen Door Press Prize for fiction for her linked story collection But Where's Home?

== Activism ==
Johnson has been active in South Los Angeles for many years in her efforts to revitalize the area by planting trees. She was instrumental in gaining approval for a major tree-planting event in January 2010 that involved Ralphs Grocery and Million Trees LA.

Johnson has published op-ed essays about South Los Angeles in the Los Angeles Times.
