= Ruby Bridges (film) =

1998 television film

- Genre: Drama
- Written by: Toni Ann Johnson
- Directed by: Euzhan Palcy
- Starring: Chaz Monet; Penelope Ann Miller; Kevin Pollak; Michael Beach
- Music by: Patrice Rushen
- Country of origin: United States
- Original language: English

Production
- Producer: Ann Hopkins
- Cinematography: John Simmons
- Editor: Paul LaMastra
- Running time: 96 min.
- Production companies: Marian Rees Associates; Walt Disney Television

Original release
- Network: ABC
- Release: January 18, 1998

Ruby Bridges is a 1998 American television film, written by Toni Ann Johnson, directed by Euzhan Palcy and based on the true story of Ruby Bridges, one of the first black students to attend integrated schools in New Orleans, Louisiana, in 1960. The film premiered on ABC on January 18, 1998. As a six-year-old, Bridges was one of four black first-graders, selected on the basis of test scores, to attend previously all-white public schools in New Orleans. Three students were sent to McDonogh 19, and Ruby was the only black child to be sent to William Frantz Elementary School. It is currently available for streaming on Disney+.

== Plot ==
Ruby Bridges tells the story of how a six-year-old Black girl integrated a New Orleans segregated school in 1960. Ruby did not achieve this feat alone – there was the NAACP that chose her; four US Marshals who kept back the angry mob of haters bent on lynching her; Barbara Henry, a kind-hearted White teacher who pushed back against her racist superiors and coworkers; Robert Coles, a famous psychiatrist to help her with the stress, and his wife Jane; and, most of all, her courageous mother, who shared the deep faith that gave the girl the strength to persist in spite of the hatred around her and of her father who initially doubted that her daughter should bear being persecuted by segregationists.

== Cast ==
- Chaz Monet as Ruby Bridges
- Penelope Ann Miller as Barbara Henry
- Kevin Pollak as Dr. Robert Coles
- Diana Scarwid as Miss Woodmere
- Lela Rochon as Lucielle "Lucy" Bridges
- Michael Beach as Abon Bridges
- Jean Louisa Kelly as Jane Coles
- Peter Francis James as Dr. Broyard
- Patrika Darbo as Miss Spencer
- Toni Ann Johnson as Alma Broyard

== Reception ==
The film holds a score of 83% on review aggregator website Rotten Tomatoes, based on 6 reviews with an average rating of 6.6/10. The film was nominated for several awards, including an NAACP Image Award. The writer, Toni Ann Johnson, won the 1998 Humanitas Prize for her teleplay. The film also won The Christopher Award.

In 2023, the film was the subject of a complaint brought by a Florida parent who claimed that the film is not appropriate for school second-graders in because it might teach them that "white people hate Black people". A potential decision to ban the film was not upheld by a committee of teachers, parents, community members and a library media technology specialist after watching the film and reviewing the objection form, as well as the school district policy.

== See also ==
- Civil rights movement in popular culture
- The Problem We All Live With, 1964 painting
