= McDonogh 19 Elementary School =

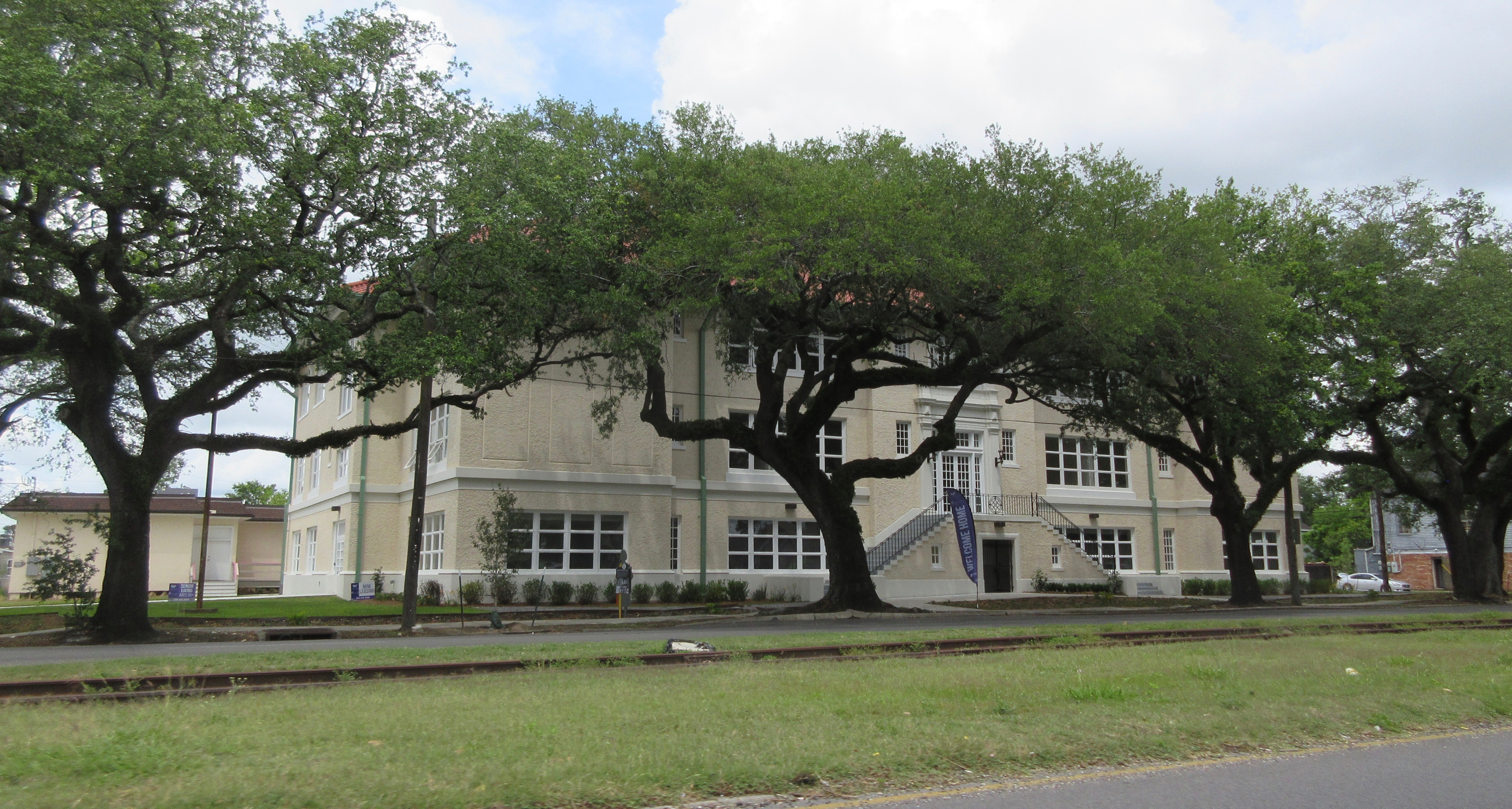
- McDonogh 19 School Building, May 2022
- New Orleans, Louisiana; United States

Information
- School type: Elementary school

- McDonogh 19 Elementary School
- U.S. National Register of Historic Places
- Location within Louisiana
- Location: 5909 St. Claude Ave., New Orleans, Louisiana
- Coordinates: 29°57′39″N 90°00′45″W
- Area: less than one acre
- Built: 1929
- Architect: E.A. Christy
- Architectural style: Italian Renaissance Revival
- NRHP reference No.: 16000672
- Added to NRHP: October 10, 2016

McDonogh 19 Elementary School is an American elementary school located at 5909 St. Claude Avenue in the Lower Ninth Ward of New Orleans, Louisiana. Along with William Frantz Elementary School, it was involved in the New Orleans school desegregation crisis during the early 1960s.

== History ==
=== Background ===
The school was built in 1929. It was funded by John McDonogh through the McDonogh Fund which built schools in New Orleans and in Baltimore, Maryland. It was designed in Italian Renaissance Revival style by the New Orleans Parish School Board's architect E.A. Christy.

=== Desegregation ===
It was an all-white school, integrated in the fall of 1960 by three young black girls, Leona Tate, Tessie Prevost, and Gail Etienne, known as the McDonogh Three. The McDonogh Three were the only students in the school for over a year. The white community was protesting daily outside McDonogh 19. The McDonogh Three needed to be escorted by US Marshals. The white community did not agree with the integration.

=== Post-integration ===
It was listed on the National Register of Historic Places in 2016.

In 2021, the building was purchased by Leona Tate and her foundation, to be transformed into a museum chronicling Civil Rights history with the help of Xavier University's Investigative Stories Program. The TEP Center named after the McDonogh Three (Tate, Etienne and Prevost) is now used as a civil rights museum, affordable housing and education.
