= New Orleans school desegregation crisis =

1960 unrest following racial desegregation

- Part of the civil rights movement
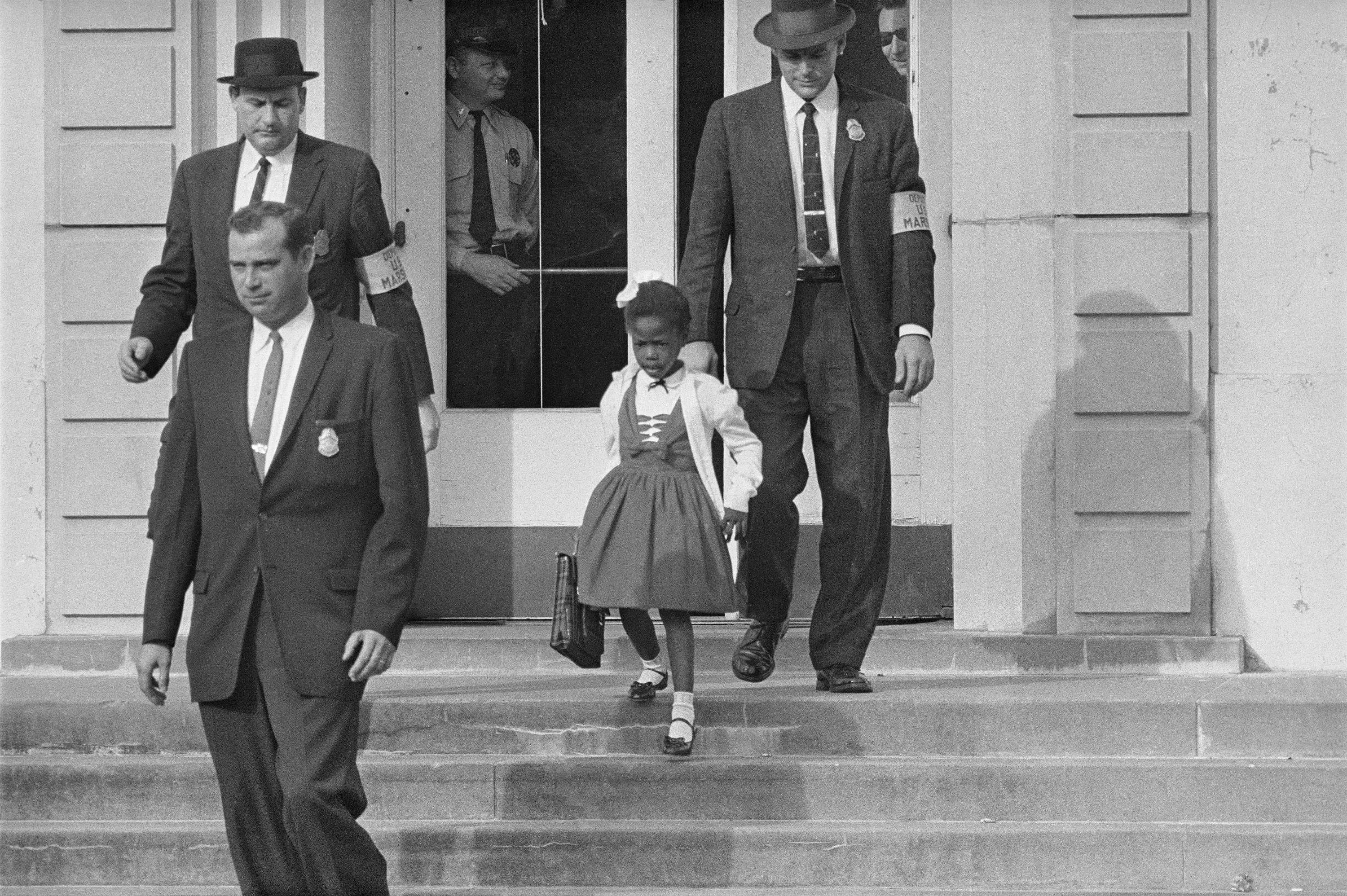
- The New Orleans Four were escorted by U.S. Marshals to integrate White-only public elementary schools in New Orleans, 1960
- Date: November 14, 1960
- Location: McDonogh No. 19 Elementary School and William Frantz Elementary School located in the Ninth Ward of New Orleans, Louisiana
- Caused by: Plessy v. Ferguson (1896); "Separate but equal" doctrine overturned by Brown v. Board of Education of Topeka (1954); Massive resistance; "All deliberate speed" ordered in Brown II (1955)
- Result: McDonogh No. 19 Elementary School and William Frantz Elementary School desegregated in 1960; Catholic Schools of Orleans Parish desegregated in 1962

Parties
Students; National Association for the Advancement of Colored People (NAACP)	Governor of Louisiana; Orleans Parish School Board (OPSB)

Lead figures
Students: McDonogh Three; Ruby Bridges; NAACP member: A. P. Tureaud	Governor of Louisiana: Jimmie Davis; Attorney: Leander Perez

The New Orleans school desegregation crisis was a period of intense public resistance in New Orleans that followed the 1954 U.S. Supreme Court ruling in Brown v. Board of Education that racial segregation of public schools was unconstitutional. The conflict peaked when U.S. Circuit Judge J. Skelly Wright ordered desegregation in New Orleans to begin on November 14, 1960.

On the morning of November 14, 1960, two New Orleans elementary schools began desegregation. Leona Tate, Tessie Provost, and Gail Etienne, enrolled at McDonogh 19 Elementary School, while Ruby Bridges enrolled at William Frantz Elementary School. They became known as The New Orleans Four. All four 6-year-old girls were met with death threats, racial slurs, and taunts. Widespread boycotts began immediately, and by the end of the day, few white children remained at either school.

On November 16, a race riot broke out in front of a meeting of the Orleans Parish School Board. Following the riot, United States marshals began accompanying the four girls to their respective schools, while death threats against them continued. During the next few days, other white parents began returning their children to school.

It took ten more years for the New Orleans public schools to fully integrate. In September 1962, the Catholic schools of Orleans Parish were also integrated.

== Background ==
In the post-Civil War Era, New Orleans worked toward equal access to education for all citizens. In 1868, Louisiana ratified a new Constitution that added language to include "Black Men" in the understanding of "all men created" equal. The state constitution included Article 135, which required Louisiana to provide free public education to all students. It also outlawed racially-segregated schools. The Compromise of 1877 led to the withdrawal of federal troops in Louisiana and returned Democrats to power, erasing the work done to desegregate schools during the Reconstruction Era.

Under the 1896 Supreme Court ruling Plessy v. Ferguson, public schools for both White and African American students were required to support "separate but equal" school facilities. Many Black public schools were not held to the same standards as White public schools. Suffering from overcrowded and outdated schools, the Black community demanded that the Plessy ruling be upheld and enforced. Within this community was Wilbert Aubert. Aubert, along with Leontine Luke, called for a meeting of the Ninth Ward Civic and Improvement League. This meeting was held November 6, 1951 at the Macarty School for Black Students. Following this meeting, the League created an initiative to file a lawsuit against the Orleans Parish School Board (OPSB).

Aubert took action against the OPSB with the aid of A. P. Tureaud, the chief legal counsel of the National Association for the Advancement of Colored People (NAACP). In Rosana Aubert v. Orleans Parish School Board, they sought better conditions within the African American schools. Two years later, U.S. District Judge Herbert William Christenberry allowed the case to proceed. It was at this time that the NAACP wanted to take further action and tackle segregation as a whole. On September 5, 1952, Tureaud filed a new suit, Bush v. Orleans Parish School Board, with 21 sets of students as plaintiffs including Earl Benjamin Bush.

The case called into question whether segregation in schools was constitutional and, if so, called for equal and fair conditions in African American schools. It was a 1954 Kansas case, Brown v. Board of Education of Topeka, however, that called for nationwide desegregation of all public schools. Following this original Brown decision, the Supreme Court in Brown II (1955) called for integration to take place with "all deliberate speed"—a phrase interpreted differently by each side. Supporters of desegregation thought that it meant schools should be desegregated immediately, but opponents of desegregation believed that leniency was allowed in the time frame for desegregation.

Despite progressive feelings in New Orleans on desegregating the city, feelings toward the school system took a different turn. After Brown, five female African American students transferred. Despite Judge J. Skelly Wright's ruling on February 15, 1956, ordering the OPSB to create an integration plan for all public schools, Senator William M. Rainach and the Louisiana State Legislature ordered all public schools to maintain segregation laws. The legislature also passed a bill allowing them to declare public schools as either white or colored.

Fighting along with the Louisiana State Legislature against integration was the OPSB and board member Emile Wagner. Gerald Rault, assisted by Judge Leander Perez, was the legal counsel in the case against the integration of public schools. Making it all the way to the Supreme Court, Rault and Perez's case was dismissed and Wright's ruling was upheld. The state legislature continued to ignore the integration order, and the NAACP demanded that Judge Wright enforce his ruling. On July 15, 1959, in response to the state legislature's resistance and the NAACP's request, Judge Wright gave a deadline of March 1, 1960, to the OPSB, the date that it would be required to integrate public schools.

Wright created a new plan when the school board failed to meet the March 1 deadline, as well as the extended deadline of March 16. The deadline for Judge Wright's desegregation plan was September 1960 when all public schools opened for the year. This plan allowed children to transfer schools and for their parents to choose any of the former white or black schools closest to their homes. While many racial separatists disapproved of Wright's decision, organizations such as Save Our Schools and the Committee for Public Education called for the integration plan to be pushed forward. The plan would apply only to the first grade, which carried the highest percentage of black students.

Once again, Wright made an agreement with the legislature to delay the plan until November 14. The board was convinced that if it delayed the plan until after the start of the school year, the students would not transfer after they were already comfortable at the school that they were attending. The delay would also allow enough time for the board and the legislature to create a plan that would create a law allowing them to decide where a child could and could not attend.

When it came time to allow students to apply to transfer schools, the school board made it as difficult as possible. With specific criteria such as availability of transportation and intelligence testing, it was almost impossible for black students to transfer schools. To delay the integration of the schools even further, Superintendent James F. Redmond ordered the principals of the two integrated public schools to close their schools Monday, November 14. That would give Governor Jimmie Davis and the legislature time to propose 30 bills that would make integration illegal even though Wright had already declared most of them unconstitutional. Less than 24 hours later, the U.S. Court of Appeals for the Fifth Circuit ruled all 30 bills unconstitutional. On November 14, the school system had officially been desegregated.

== Desegregation ==
The New Orleans school district integrated William Frantz Elementary School and McDonogh 19 Elementary School on November 14, 1960. The public held the opinion that an uptown school would be used because children in the uptown schools had wealthier parents that could afford to enroll their children in a segregated school. Instead, desegregation happened in significantly more impoverished schools in the Lower Ninth Ward.

Five girls were selected to attend white schools but of the five only four decided to transfer: Leona Tate, Tessie Prevost, and Gaile Etienne attended McDonogh No. 19, while Ruby Bridges attended William Frantz Elementary. The girls were escorted to and from school by U.S. marshals. They were met by a large crowd of angry protestors. As word spread that McDonogh No. 19 and William Frantz were the schools that would be chosen for integration, more people joined the protest. Concerned white parents began picking up their children. A group formed and began chanting "segregation forever". They also cheered for every white student who left school that day.

Soon a group known as "The Cheerleaders" formed. They were a group of mostly middle-class housewives, outraged by the schools' desegregation. Leander Perez, a popular white supremacist leader, held a meeting which 5,000 people attended. The day after Perez's meeting, hundreds of teenagers gathered at the school board office and dispersed after the police arrived in riot gear. Reporters flocked to the city to report on the civil unrest. The protesters yelling at the six-year-old girls made the city look undesirable to many people. So much, that many people wrote to the mayor at the time. Mayor Morrison soon asked reporters to leave but did not address the protests. Soon the rioting died down and the school year continued. Many white families moved to the St. Bernard Parish and between 1960 and 1970, the white population fell in the Lower Ninth Ward by 77 percent.

In total 194 people were arrested for loitering, 27 for vandalism, and 29 for carrying a concealed weapon. Stabbing and gas bombing incidents happened throughout the city and a large fight between groups of black and white people broke out. Several Louisiana officials flew to Florida to meet with President-elect John F. Kennedy with the intention to seek his opinion on the situation. They claimed that federally prohibiting state interference against the state's will was wrong. Kennedy designated Clark Clifford to meet the group. He said it was inappropriate for Kennedy to talk about such matters; but after the meeting Clifford telephoned Christian Faser, who he had just met with, claiming that Kennedy agreed.

== Aftermath ==
In years following the New Orleans School Crisis of 1960, the city quickly tried to forget one of the most tumultuous parts of its history. The young black girls who were chosen to be the first to integrate the New Orleans public schools "were largely forgotten". Despite this, there remains a deep division of demographics in contemporary private and public schools in New Orleans. Two decades following the crisis, white student enrollment fell by almost half as middle- and upper-class white and black families began to send their children to private institutions. A relatively steady decrease in white student enrollment in private schools and a slight increase in black student enrollment at public schools continued so that by the 2004–2005 school year (the year before Hurricane Katrina), 94 percent of New Orleans public school students were from lower-income, black families who could not afford to send their children to private schools. Among these schools, two-thirds of them were rated "Academically Unacceptable" according to Louisiana's accountability standards.

Some progress to improve the quality of education in New Orleans has been made since the crisis and Hurricane Katrina: test scores have improved, new charter schools are opening, and facilities are being upgraded. One thing that remains the same, however, is that although the city's population is about 40 percent white, the student bodies at public and charter schools are overwhelmingly black. Conversely, New Orleans has one of the highest percentages of children enrolled in private schools within Louisiana and the United States. Some attribute this growth to the "strong relationship between Catholic and independent schools," however, another possible explanation could be the public's apprehension towards public schools in general. Whether or not this is an issue of race, the trends in demographics between public, charter and private schools are clear: public and charter schools, with highly concentrated black populations, suffer from under funding of hurricane-damaged facilities, faculties, and staffs, and educational resources whereas private schools, with highly concentrated White populations, benefit from private funding. It is predicted that if achievement levels continue to rise, white students will begin to return to public schools to help create more diverse student bodies at public and charter school systems but only time will tell. Although there are no legal requirements that schools integrate, there are legal requirements that they improve.

== See also ==
- Desegregated public schools in New Orleans
