= Dead in a Heartbeat =

2002 Canadian television film

- Genre: Drama; Action; Crime; Thriller
- Written by: Mark Rosman; Richard Ades
- Directed by: Paul Antier
- Starring: Judge Reinhold; Penelope Ann Miller; Timothy Busfield; Fulvio Cecere
- Music by: Louis Febre
- Countries of origin: Canada; United States
- Original language: English

Production
- Executive producers: Bob Chmiel; Dan Paulson
- Producer: Shawn Williamson
- Cinematography: Danny Nowak
- Editors: Marta Evry; Randy Roberts
- Running time: 91 minutes
- Production companies: TBS; Shavick Entertainment; Daniel L. Paulson Productions; Pacemaker Productions

Original release
- Network: TBS
- Release: March 3, 2002

Dead in a Heartbeat is a television film that originally aired on TBS on March 3, 2002. In it, Dr. Gillian Hayes, a heart surgeon, and Tom Royko, a bomb squad lieutenant, try to stop her patients' artificial pacemakers, containing grieving father Zachary Franklin's bombs, from exploding.

== Plot ==
Dr. Gillian Hayes is performing heart surgery to attempt to save a patient. Another doctor decides that saving the patient is hopeless. After the patient dies, Dr. Hayes is upset at the other doctor for giving up. The coroner's report says that it appears as if something had exploded from within the patient's chest. Lt. Tom Royko questioned Dr. Hayes in her office about the patient who died and Dr. Hayes believes that Lt. Royko considers her a suspect. Royko denies that.

Later, a nervous patient who is to receive a pacemaker is worried that something will go wrong during the surgery. Dr. Hayes assured the patient that it is such a common and safe procedure and sarcastically claimed that she could even perform the operation blindfolded. The patient said he realized this but was still nervous since it was his heart that was being operated on. A receptionist receives a phone call from someone who claims that there is a bomb in operating room #4 that will explode at 1:00. The receptionist looked at the clock which read approximately 12:50. The receptionist went into the operating room to tell them that there was a bomb in the room and that they needed to evacuate. Dr. Hayes was in the middle of surgery at the time, operating on the nervous patient, and said that evacuation was not an option. Another doctor asked if evacuation was an option for her. At 12:59, Dr. Hayes and the patient were the only ones in the room. Tom Royko came in and told Dr. Hayes that she needed to leave. Dr. Hayes refused to leave and was angry with Tom Royko for coming into the operating room unmasked and thus contaminating the patient. Lt. Royko pulled Dr. Hayes away from the patient just in time. The patient exploded right afterwards; it turns out that the bomb was in the pacemaker that Dr. Hayes had implanted during the surgery.

Later, Lt. Royko told Dr. Hayes to compile a list of ex-boyfriends or other people who are possible suspects. Lt. Royko told Dr. Hayes that originally she was a suspect but that her refusal to leave the operating room took her off the list of potential suspects.

A cellular phone was found in a Federal Express package in Dr. Hayes' office. The cellular phone was from the person planting the bombs. He gave the information about a flight which the next victim was a passenger. The cellular phone also displayed a number which was a countdown to when the bomb would explode. A hypothesis that Hayes and Royko had was that the count down was linked to the victim's heartbeat. They also realized that as soon as the pacemaker was removed it would explode. Dr. Hayes suggested attaching it to a simulator so that it would still think it is attached to the heart. The next victim was Mr. Benjamin McDonald who was in the airport as Dr. Hayes and Lt. Royko showed up. Mr. McDonald was called to the desk and Dr. Hayes and Lt. Royko informed him that something was wrong with the pacemaker. They brought Mr. McDonald into a different room where they attempted to remove the pacemaker, assuring him that everything would be fine. Dr. Hayes had isolated the pacemaker and was ready to be removed but unfortunately, the simulator had not arrived in time. Lt. Royko was given a shield to sit behind while he cut the pacemaker from a distance. Mr. McDonald's last words were to tell his wife and children that he loved them. Right after Lt. Royko cut the pacemaker, it exploded.

Dr. Hayes eventually learn a man named Zachary Franklin is planting the bombs because his son died during her surgery.

Franklin said that the next victim would be at an elementary school. Dr. Hayes said there was a little boy there who was a patient. Dr. Hayes and Lt. Royko arrived at the elementary school and brought the boy into a room to operate on. Lt. Royko pulled the fire alarm. During the operation, Dr. Hayes said that since the boy's heartrate has been accelerating but that the rate of countdown of Franklin's timer to when the bomb would explode did not speed up, then the countdown must not be linked to the patient's heartrate. Dr. Hayes removed the pacemaker and there was no explosion. Lt. Royko said that Franklin gave them too much time so he must have not wanted the boy to die. After Dr. Hayes and Lt. Royko went outside, Dr. Hayes recognized a teacher who was a patient of hers. However, they did not have enough time to remove the pacemaker and they did not have a simulator that would be used to make the pacemaker behave as if it is still attached to the heart. Lt. Royko told the teacher to come with him, and ran with her away from the students. The teacher's chest exploded as Royko was running with her away from the crowd. The teacher was killed but Lt. Royko was not harmed.

Franklin then leaves a cake for Sean's birthday at Dr. Hayes' home. After officers come to check her house, Franklin calls, and says that tomorrow, on Sean's 14th birthday, he will kill 14 patients. Dr. Hayes and Lt. Royko must race against time to save them.

After discovering Franklin's hideout in front of Dr. Hayes' office at the hospital, and his true plan, they must now race against time to save Lt. Royko's son, who Franklin has kidnapped. Franklin implanted a pacemaker in Lt. Royko's son, kidnaps Dr. Hayes as she is coming to the hospital basement, connects Lt. Royko's son's pacemaker with Dr. Hayes' pulse with a special device, and then commits suicide by jumping off the hospital roof with a bomb. Lt. Royko and Dr. Hayes rush to the hospital basement to save Lt. Royko's son just in time.

== Cast ==
- Penelope Ann Miller as Dr. Gillian Hayes
- Judge Reinhold as Lieutenant Tom Royko
- Timothy Busfield as Zachary Franklin
- Mark Holden as Vice Principal
