= Barbara Henry =

American teacher (b. 1932)

- Born: May 18, 1932 (age 93); West Roxbury, Boston, Massachusetts, U.S.
- Education: Girls' Latin School
- Occupation: Teacher
- Years active: 1960; retired
- Known for: Teaching Ruby Bridges in William Frantz Elementary School

Barbara Henry (born May 1, 1932) is a retired American teacher most notable for teaching Ruby Bridges, the first African-American child to attend the all-white William Frantz Elementary School, located in New Orleans.

Henry had gone to Girls' Latin School in Boston, where "we learned… to appreciate and enjoy our important commonalities, amid our external differences of class, community, or color." She had taught in overseas military dependents' schools, which were integrated. Henry and her husband had been in New Orleans for two months when the superintendent called to offer her a teaching position. When Henry asked if the job was in a school that would be integrated, the superintendent replied, "Would that make any difference to you?" She said no.

On the first day of the school year in 1960, Henry's and Bridges' relentless refusal to be intimidated caused them to become renowned figures in the American civil rights battle. As soon as Bridges got into the school, white parents went in and brought their own children out; all but one of the white teachers also refused to teach while a black child was enrolled. Only Henry was willing to teach Bridges, and for more than a year, Ms. Henry taught her alone, as if she were teaching a whole class.

That first day, Ruby and her adult companions spent the entire day in the principal's office; the chaos of the school prevented their moving to the classroom until the second day. Ruby Bridges was initially apprehensive upon meeting Henry for the first time, recalling later that "Even though there were mobs outside that school every day for a whole year, the person that greeted me every morning was [my teacher], a white woman, who actually risked her life as well", and "I had never seen a white teacher before, but Ms. Henry was the nicest teacher I ever had. She tried very hard to keep my mind off what was going on outside. But I couldn't forget that there were no other kids."

The court-ordered first day of integrated schools in New Orleans, November 14, 1960, was commemorated by Norman Rockwell in the painting The Problem We All Live With.
