= Adolph Meyer School =

Historic school building in New Orleans, Louisiana, US

- U.S. National Register of Historic Places
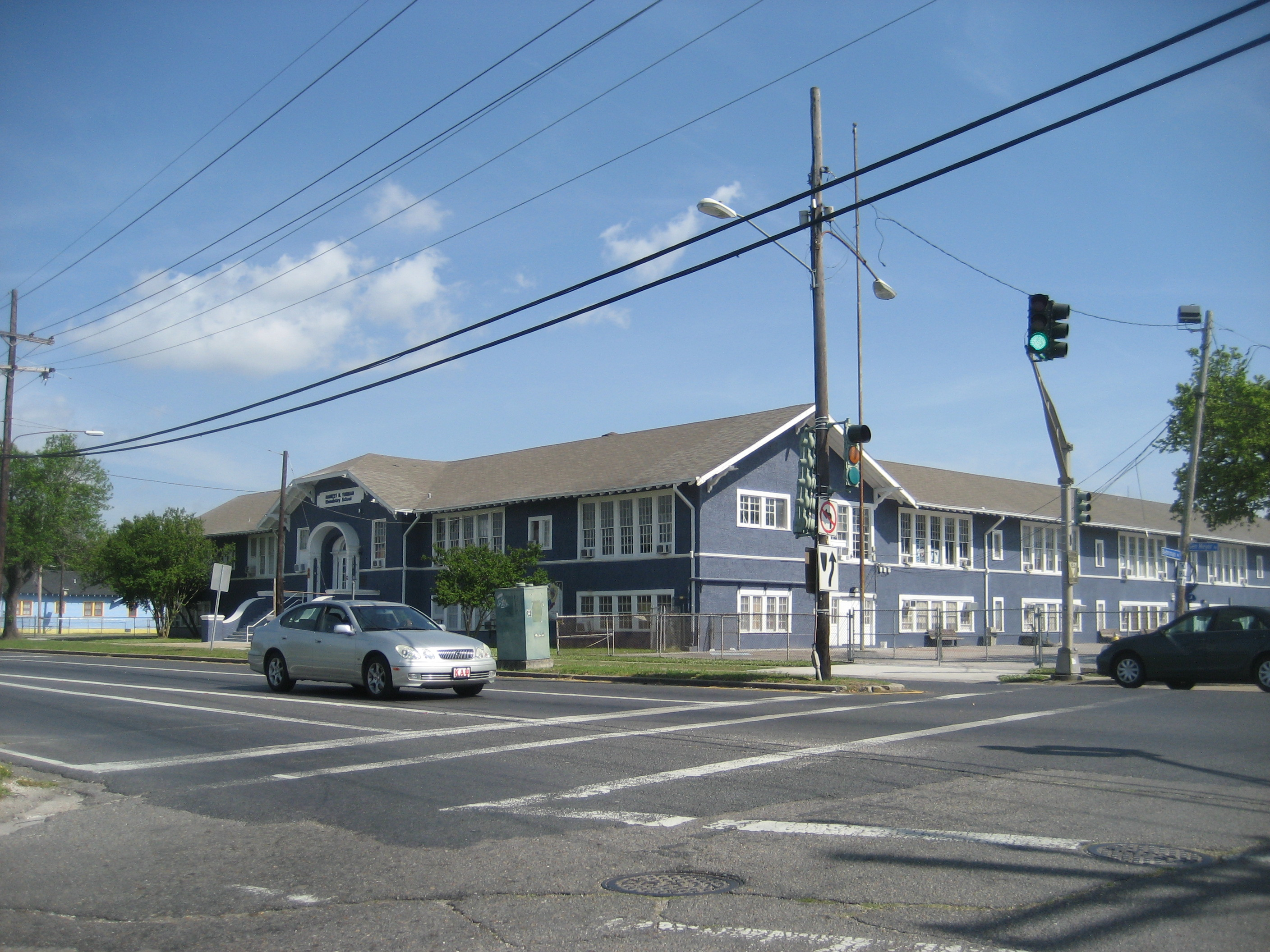

- Location within Louisiana
- Location: 2013 General Meyer Ave., New Orleans, Louisiana
- Coordinates: 29°56′41″N 90°02′10″W
- Area: 1.29 acres (0.52 ha)
- Built: 1917, 1924, c. 1930–1937
- Architect: E. A. Christy
- Architectural style: Craftsman
- NRHP reference No.: 15001013
- Added to NRHP: February 1, 2016

The Adolph Meyer School, also known as Harriet R. Tubman Elementary School, is a historic school building at 2013 General Meyer Avenue in the Algiers neighborhood of New Orleans, Louisiana. Built in 1917 and expanded in 1924, the school was designed by E. A. Christy, the architect for the Orleans Parish School Board. The property was listed on the National Register of Historic Places on February 1, 2016.

The school was renamed for Harriet Tubman in the 1990s. It now houses Harriet Tubman Charter School, a public charter school for pre-kindergarten through eighth grade students.

== Site ==
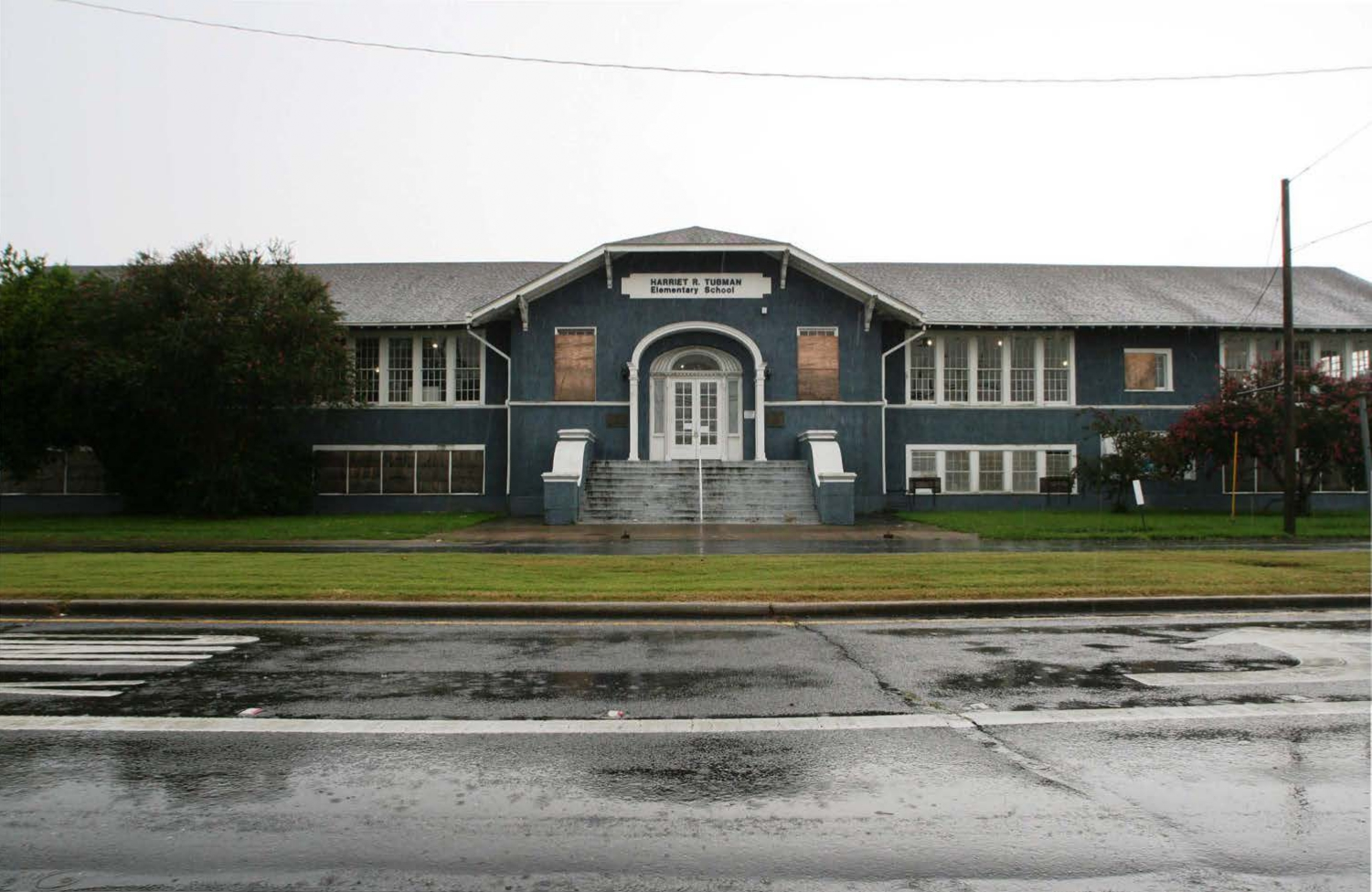
Front of the building

The school occupies a city block bounded by General Meyer Avenue on the north, Numa Street on the east, Diana Street on the south and Behrman Avenue on the west. The property is in Algiers, on the west bank of the Mississippi River. Across General Meyer Avenue is the former U.S. Naval Station Algiers Historic District, a 48-acre (19 ha) historic district listed on the National Register in 2013.

The National Register listing includes three contributing buildings: the main school building, an annex and a caretaker's cottage at 2020 Diana Street. The boundary covers 1.29 acres (0.52 ha) and follows the legal boundary of the block.

== Architecture ==
The main school building is a two-story, wood-frame Craftsman school with a concrete slab foundation, stucco walls and a gable roof with asphalt shingles. The building has a rectangular O-shaped plan, with four wings surrounding a central courtyard. The original north wing was built in 1917, and the rest of the main building was added in 1924.

The primary elevation faces General Meyer Avenue. Its entrance is centered on a symmetrical facade and set within a projecting bay with a clipped-gable, or jerkinhead, roof. A wide staircase leads to the second-floor entrance, which is placed within a shallow barrel-vaulted archway. The double French doors are framed by sidelights, a dentil course, an elliptical fanlight and decorative molding. Bronze plaques at the entrance identify the date of construction, architect and school board.

Craftsman details include exposed eaves, brackets, triangular knee braces, grouped multi-light windows, wood trim and built-in cabinetry. The school also contains interior features associated with early 20th-century school design, including transoms between corridors and classrooms, wood floors, picture rails, baseboards, door and window frames and original interior doors with multi-light windows and inset wood panels.

The school was designed to provide natural light and ventilation. Classrooms and offices line the street-facing walls, while corridors run along the courtyard. The use of an O-shaped plan, grouped windows and transoms reflected early 20th-century school design standards related to light, air and hygiene.

== Annex and caretaker's cottage ==
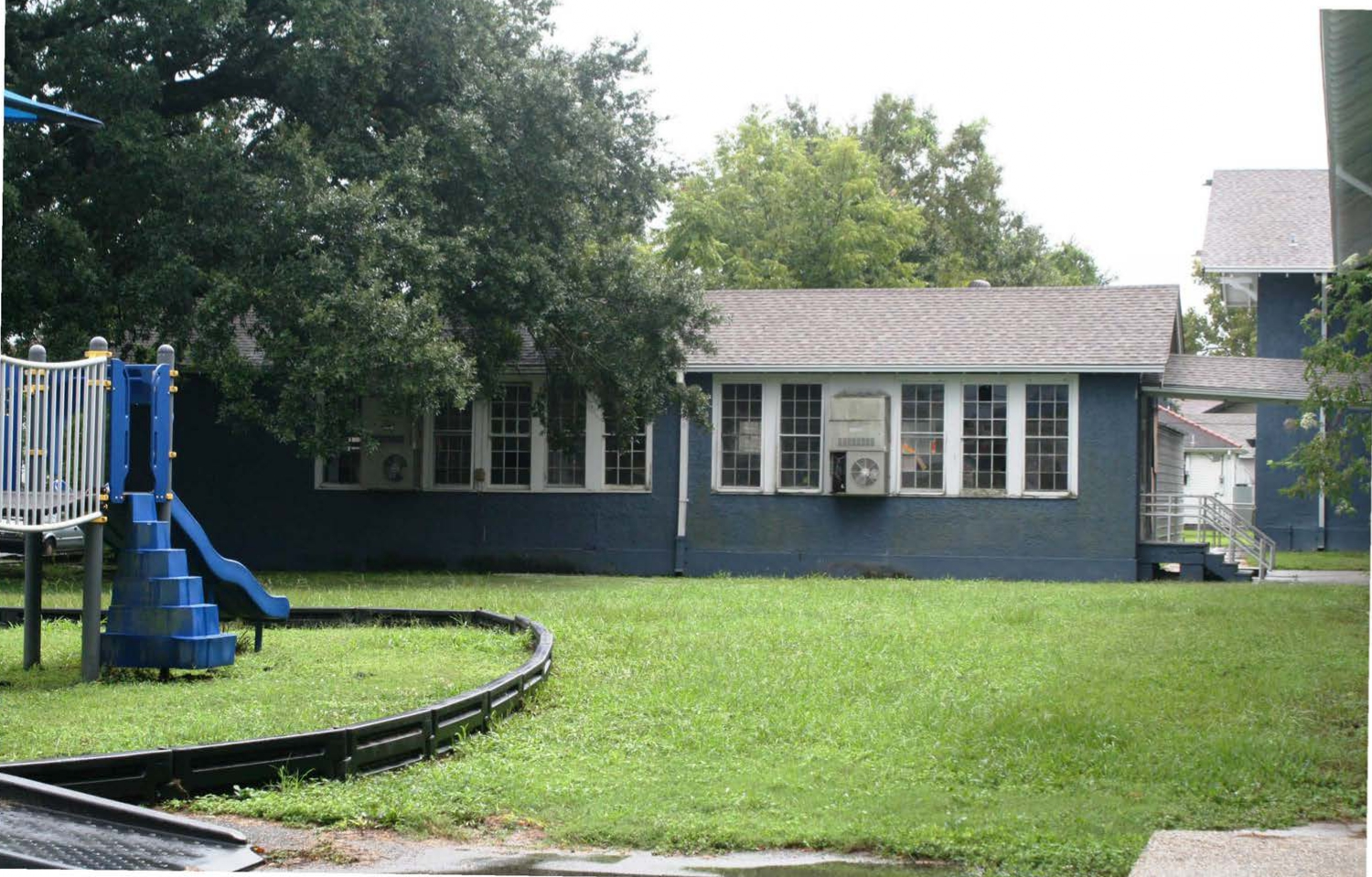
Annex building

The annex is a one-story building east of the main school building. It is connected to the main building by a covered walkway. The annex measures about 960 square feet (89 m^{2}) and was built between 1925 and 1937 to provide space for an overcrowded school. Its exterior is similar to the main building, with stucco walls, exposed eaves and brackets.

The caretaker's cottage at 2020 Diana Street is also a contributing resource. The cottage was likely built around 1905, before the school, and was retained for use in connection with the school. It is a one-story, wood-frame duplex with a front porch facing Diana Street. Residents associated with the cottage included school employees, including Rose Vinet, identified in census records as a janitress at Adolph Meyer School, and Freddie Luft, identified in a 1953 newspaper article as the school custodian.

== History ==
Adolph Meyer School opened in 1917 in an area some distance from other public schools. Mary Vaughan served as principal, with two assisting teachers, and the school initially served first through fifth grades. The Orleans Parish School Board had expected enrollment of 120 to 150 pupils. A sixth-grade class was added in 1918, and the school later expanded to include first through eighth grades after housing growth near the Algiers Naval Station increased demand.

The school was named for Adolph Meyer, a Confederate veteran and member of the United States House of Representatives. Meyer supported the establishment of the naval station in Algiers, across General Meyer Avenue from the school. The school was renamed for Harriet Tubman in the 1990s.

Enrollment growth created overcrowding soon after the school opened. Additional classrooms were created on the ground floor by 1922. In 1923, the superintendent recommended expanding the school by 10 classrooms rather than six because of growth in the surrounding neighborhood. The 1924 addition, designed by Christy, cost $30,000 and added the east and west wings. The annex was added between 1925 and 1937 as another response to overcrowding.

Overcrowding continued into the mid-20th century. In 1934, the Orleans Parish School Board approved buses to transport students from outlying schools, including Adolph Meyer School. In 1948, the board announced that 125 seventh- and eighth-grade students would be transferred from Adolph Meyer to nearby schools. In 1953, the board leased two vacant barracks from the naval station across the street for classroom space.

The school operated as a neighborhood school through January 2014. It was vacant when the National Register registration was prepared in 2015. The building was later renovated and became the General Meyer Avenue campus of Harriet Tubman Charter School.

== Significance ==
Adolph Meyer School was listed on the National Register under Criterion A for education and Criterion C for architecture. Its educational significance is tied to early 20th-century public school expansion in New Orleans and to Progressive Era school design ideals related to health, safety, natural light and ventilation. Its architectural significance comes from its Craftsman design and its status as one of two surviving Craftsman-style frame school buildings in New Orleans and Orleans Parish.

The school was part of a period of public school construction and reform during the administration of New Orleans Mayor Martin Behrman. Behrman, who served as mayor for much of the period from 1904 to 1920, promoted school construction as part of his city administration. By 1920, one in three schools in New Orleans had been built during his time in office, including Adolph Meyer School.

The building also represents the work of E. A. Christy, who served as architect for the Orleans Parish School Board from 1911 to 1940. Christy designed more than 50 primary, secondary and vocational school buildings and remodeled 11 school buildings constructed before 1911. His school buildings used functional layouts, efficient space planning and decorative features suited to the architectural styles of their period.

== Current use ==
Harriet Tubman Charter School occupies the historic Adolph Meyer building at 2013 General Meyer Avenue. The school serves prekindergarten through eighth grade students and is listed by the National Center for Education Statistics as an open public charter school. The school's 3rd–8th grade campus page describes the Adolph Meyer building as renovated and notes that it was added to the National Register in 2016.

== See also ==
- National Register of Historic Places listings in Orleans Parish, Louisiana
