= The Freshman (1990 film) =

1990 film by Andrew Bergman

- Theatrical release poster
- Directed by: Andrew Bergman
- Written by: Andrew Bergman
- Produced by: Mike Lobell
- Starring: Marlon Brando; Matthew Broderick; Bruno Kirby; Maximilian Schell; Penelope Ann Miller; Frank Whaley
- Cinematography: William A. Fraker
- Edited by: Barry Malkin
- Music by: David Newman
- Distributed by: Tri-Star Pictures
- Release date: July 20, 1990
- Running time: 102 minutes
- Country: United States
- Language: English
- Budget: $12 million
- Box office: $21.5 million

The Freshman is a 1990 American crime comedy film written and directed by Andrew Bergman, and starring Marlon Brando, Matthew Broderick, Bruno Kirby, Maximilian Schell, Penelope Ann Miller, and Frank Whaley. The plot revolves around a young New York film student's entanglement in an illicit business of offering exotic and endangered animals as specialty food items, including his being tasked with delivering a Komodo dragon for this purpose. The Freshman was released by Tri-Star Pictures on July 20, 1990. The film received positive reviews from critics and grossed $21.5 million against a $12 million budget.

== Plot ==
Clark Kellogg leaves his mother Liz and environmental activist stepfather Dwight in Vermont to go to New York University (NYU) to study film. After arriving at Grand Central Terminal, a man named Victor Ray offers to drive Clark and his luggage to his destination for $10. However, the second Clark steps out of Victor's car at the university, the latter drives off with his luggage still in the trunk.

The following day, Clark goes to the office of Professor Fleeber, his instructor at NYU. He explains how he lost his money and belongings, but Fleeber is unsympathetic. Through the window, Clark notices Vic walking by and gives chase. After finally catching up to him, Clark demands the return of his money. Vic claims to have lost the money gambling, but still has most of Clark's clothes. After threatening to go to the police, Vic offers Clark a well-paying job as reimbursement. The following afternoon, Clark goes to a small social club in Little Italy, where he is introduced to Vic's uncle Carmine Sabatini, who bears an uncanny resemblance to Vito Corleone in The Godfather.

Carmine offers Clark the opportunity to make a lot of money just for running small errands. The first is to pick up a Komodo dragon from JFK Airport and transport it to a specific address in New Jersey. Clark enlists the help of his NYU roommate Steve Bushak to pick up the lizard and deliver it to Larry London and his assistant Edward.

Clark is also introduced to Carmine's daughter Tina who takes an immediate shine to him. Tina talks as if the two are soon to be married. A distracted Clark tries to pay attention in Fleeber's film class (where the professor shows clips of the 1974 film The Godfather Part II), but he is soon being chased by agents Chuck Greenwald and Lloyd Simpson of the Department of Justice.

Upon being caught, Clark is told by Greenwald and Simpson that Carmine—also known as "Jimmy the Toucan"—not only is a Mafia figure but runs the Fabulous Gourmet Club. It is an illicit and nomadic establishment, never holding its dinners in the same place twice, where (for enormous prices) endangered animals are served as the main course, specially prepared by Larry London. Clark is told that "for the privilege of eating the very last of a species", a million dollars is charged.

Clark finds out that Dwight listened in on a conversation with Liz. Right after Clark mentioned the Komodo dragon, Dwight contacted the Department of Justice. Carmine admits that the Gourmet Club exists, but tells Clark that Greenwald and Simpson are being bribed by the Bonelli crime family that wants both Carmine and Clark dead. While driving to the Gourmet Club, a plan is hatched to get Carmine out of the exotic animal business for good and to clear Clark.

At the Gourmet Club's dinner, longtime Miss America pageant host Bert Parks sings a version of "There She Is" when the Komodo dragon is revealed. Clark steps outside to signal Greenwald and Simpson, who raid the club. Carmine is upset that Clark has ratted him out. Carmine pulls a gun, the two wrestle, and Carmine is apparently shot dead.

Revealing their corruption, Greenwald and Simpson leave with a duffel bag filled with money, though they are soon caught by real FBI agents and arrested for their crimes. Clark berates his stepfather who leaves. Carmine then gets up off the floor, having faked his death. Larry London reveals tonight's expensive and exotic dinner is actually Hawaiian tigerfish mixed with smoked turkey from Virginia, not endangered species (a long-running con of Carmine's, swindling the rich out of their money). The endangered animals will be in fact housed in the new Carmine Sabatini Endangered Species Wing at the Bronx Zoo. Clark was hand-picked by Carmine, who was in fact working with the FBI, because they knew Clark's stepfather would contact the corrupt agents once he found out about Clark's "job".

Tina's aggressive interest in Clark was an act as well, but she and Clark now share a mutual attraction. Carmine and Clark take the Komodo dragon for a walk, Carmine promising it will be taken safely to a new habitat at the zoo. As the credits start rolling, Carmine offers to help Clark make it in Hollywood, having a few connections there. Clark says "Thanks, but no thanks" as they continue walking.

== Cast ==
- Marlon Brando as Carmine Sabatini, the proprietor of the Gourmet Club, parodying Brando's role as Vito Corleone from the 1972 film The Godfather.
- Matthew Broderick as Clark Kellogg, a university student who befriends Carmine.
- Bruno Kirby as Victor Ray, Carmine's nephew. Kirby had played young Peter Clemenza in the 1974 film The Godfather Part II.
- Penelope Ann Miller as Tina Sabatini, Carmine's daughter.
- Frank Whaley as Steve Bushak, Clark's roommate.
- Jon Polito as Chuck Greenwald, a corrupt operative of the Department of Justice's Fish and Wildlife Division who targets Carmine and has ties with the Bonelli crime family.
- Paul Benedict as Arthur Fleeber, a professor at New York University.
- Richard Gant as Lloyd Simpson, also a corrupt operative of the Department of Justice's Fish and Wildlife Division and Greenwald's partner who targets Carmine and has ties with the Bonelli crime family.
- Kenneth Welsh as Dwight Armstrong, Clark's animal activist stepfather.
- Pamela Payton-Wright as Liz Armstrong, Clark's mother.
- BD Wong as Edward, one of Carmine's associates.
- Maximilian Schell as Larry London, Carmine's partner and the chef of the Gourmet Club.
- Bert Parks as himself (he sings at the Gourmet Club).

David Was and Don Was make uncredited cameos as two band members of the Gourmet Club's party band.

== Production ==
Bergman got the idea of the film after reading a newspaper article about mobster Vincent Teresa being arrested for smuggling a near-extinct lizard into the United States. Brando was cast in 1988, and was paid $3 million base salary. Bergman said that "the most fun I ever had" as a filmmaker "was once Marlon [Brando] committed to play the character Jimmy the Toucan... Rewriting that [script], knowing Marlon was going to be saying all those lines? It was absolutely heaven.... On one level you're like, I'm going to direct this guy!? But at the end of the day you say, well, somebody’s got to direct him, so what the hell, it's going to be me. And he was really a pleasure to work with. It's not like you’re dealing with George Burns in terms of a comedy god. Getting Marlon to do things was sometimes like turning around an aircraft carrier because he had a way he wanted to do it. But you could get him there. He was terribly respectful and funny." Bergman says Matthew Broderick "was very hot at the time. He was impossible to get—he was like the hottest thing going!" but he agreed to do the film because of Brando. "Once Marlon was in the picture, you could get any actor you want... Olivier wanted to be in the movie [instead of Max Schell] but he was too sick."

Principal photography was scheduled to begin in October 1988, but was delayed eight months to June 1989. After shooting exteriors in New York City for three weeks, the production moved to Toronto, Canada, for the remainder of the 11-week shoot. Though referred to in the film as a "Komodo Dragon", the lizards supplied for filming were actually Asian water monitors, a slightly smaller relative. A tame specimen was used for scenes requiring the actors to interact with it, while the chase sequences used more aggressive lizards. The Komodo dragon species is endangered, though not as severely as is described in the film.

Marlon Brando publicly condemned The Freshman and claimed it would be the "biggest turkey of all time". This was because Brando asked for an additional $1 million to compensate him for when filming was extended an extra week. The producers initially refused Brando's request and he threatened to badmouth the film in the press. The producers continued to refuse and Brando followed through with his threat. A day later, the producers acquiesced and agreed to pay him the $1 million; Brando began to publicly praise the film.

Winona Ryder was originally offered the part of Tina in the film but the offer was later rescinded when the production team took offense to her role in Heathers.

== Reception ==
Janet Maslin of The New York Times called the film "witty and enchanted." In his review, Roger Ebert wrote, "There have been a lot of movies where stars have repeated the triumphs of their parts—but has any star ever done it more triumphantly than Marlon Brando does in The Freshman?" Gene Siskel described the film as "a rare original script that ranges from film-school parody to a fantastic caper saga."

The film scored 94% on Rotten Tomatoes based on 50 reviews. The site's consensus states: "Buoyed by the charm of Matthew Broderick in the title role and Marlon Brando as a caricature of his Godfather persona, The Freshman benefits from solid casting, a clever premise and sweet humor". On Metacritic it averaged 78/100, based on 27 critics. It earned a B+ on CinemaScore.
