= Leona Tate =

American civil rights activist

Leona Tate (born October 31, 1954) is an American activist, civil rights pioneer, and community advocate from New Orleans. She was one of the first Black children in the United States to desegregate a public elementary school.

== Biography ==
=== Early life and education ===
Tate was born and raised in the Lower Ninth Ward of New Orleans. She and her family were selected among many applicants to be the initial implementers of school desegregation.

On the morning of November 14, 1960, four 6-year-old girls: Tate, Tessie Prevost, Gail Etienne and Ruby Bridges became the first African Americans to desegregate formerly all white elementary public schools in New Orleans and the Deep South. Three of the girls, Tate, Prevost and Etienne (also known as the McDonogh Three) enrolled at McDonogh 19 Elementary School at 5909 St. Claude Avenue, and Bridges enrolled at William Frantz Elementary School at 3811 North Galvez Street.

As soon as Tate and her peers entered the schools, the white children were pulled out by their parents; for 18 months the girls were the only students in their class. With worldwide attention focused on New Orleans, federal marshals wearing yellow armbands began escorting The New Orleans Four into the schools at 9 a.m. By 9:25 a.m., the two public elementary schools in the Deep South were integrated.

In 1962, the school became an all black-school and as a result, Tate, Etienne and Prevost marched on to integrate another formerly all white elementary school, T.J. Semmes.

The integration of New Orleans public elementary schools marked a major focal point in the history of the American civil rights movement. As of 2026, there is only one remaining traditional public high school in New Orleans, The Leah Chase School. The District features 20 other "public" high schools, but they are run by independent non-profit charter boards rather than directly by the Orleans Parish School Board.

=== Foundation ===
In 2009, Leona Tate, established the Leona Tate Foundation for Change to help purchase McDonogh 19, the school she with Tessie Prevost and Gail Etienne integrated. Today, she and her partners at Alembic Community Development are readying the historic landmark building to reopen in Spring 2021 as the Tate, Etienne, and Prevost (TEP) Center, a mixed-use development dedicated to the history of New Orleans Public School Desegregation, Civil Rights, and Black Life. Her mission for the TEP Center is to create a safe space and community anchor where the public can learn, support, and train for anti-racism activism and social restorative justice.
