= E. A. Christy =

American architect

E. A. Christy was an American architect who designed more than 50 public schools, as well as fire stations and other works. He also designed numerous expansions of existing schools. Several of his works are listed on the National Register of Historic Places.

He was born Edgar Angelo Christy.

He was the New Orleans Parish School Board's architect from 1911 to 1940. In 2005, 48 of his schools were still in use.

New Orleans, during the Progressive Era, under Mayor Martin Behrman addressed the great shortage of schools in the city, starting from a point where only 30 percent of children were enrolled in schools, and those in the few overcrowded schools in the city (63 white and 9 black).

"As school board architect from 1911 to 1940, Christy designed over 50 primary, secondary and vocational schools as well as various remodelings of schools. His designs reflect the variety of styles popular over an almost 30 year span. Christy is credited with designing the first modern school facilities in the city. Today 48 of his schools are still in use. Collectively they make an important contribution to the city's architectural fabric."

Christy's works include (all in New Orleans):

- Adolph Meyer School (1917, 1924), 2013 General Meyer Ave., New Orleans. Christy designed the original elementary school and its 1924 expansion in Craftsman style in an O-shaped design around a courtyard. NRHP-listed in 2016.
- William Frantz School, 3811 N. Galvez St., New Orleans, NRHP-listed
- McDonogh School No. 6, 4849 Chestnut St., New Orleans, NRHP-listed
- Central Fire Station (Engine 29) (1913), 317 Decatur Street, New Orleans
