= Ruby Bridges =

American civil rights activist (born 1954)

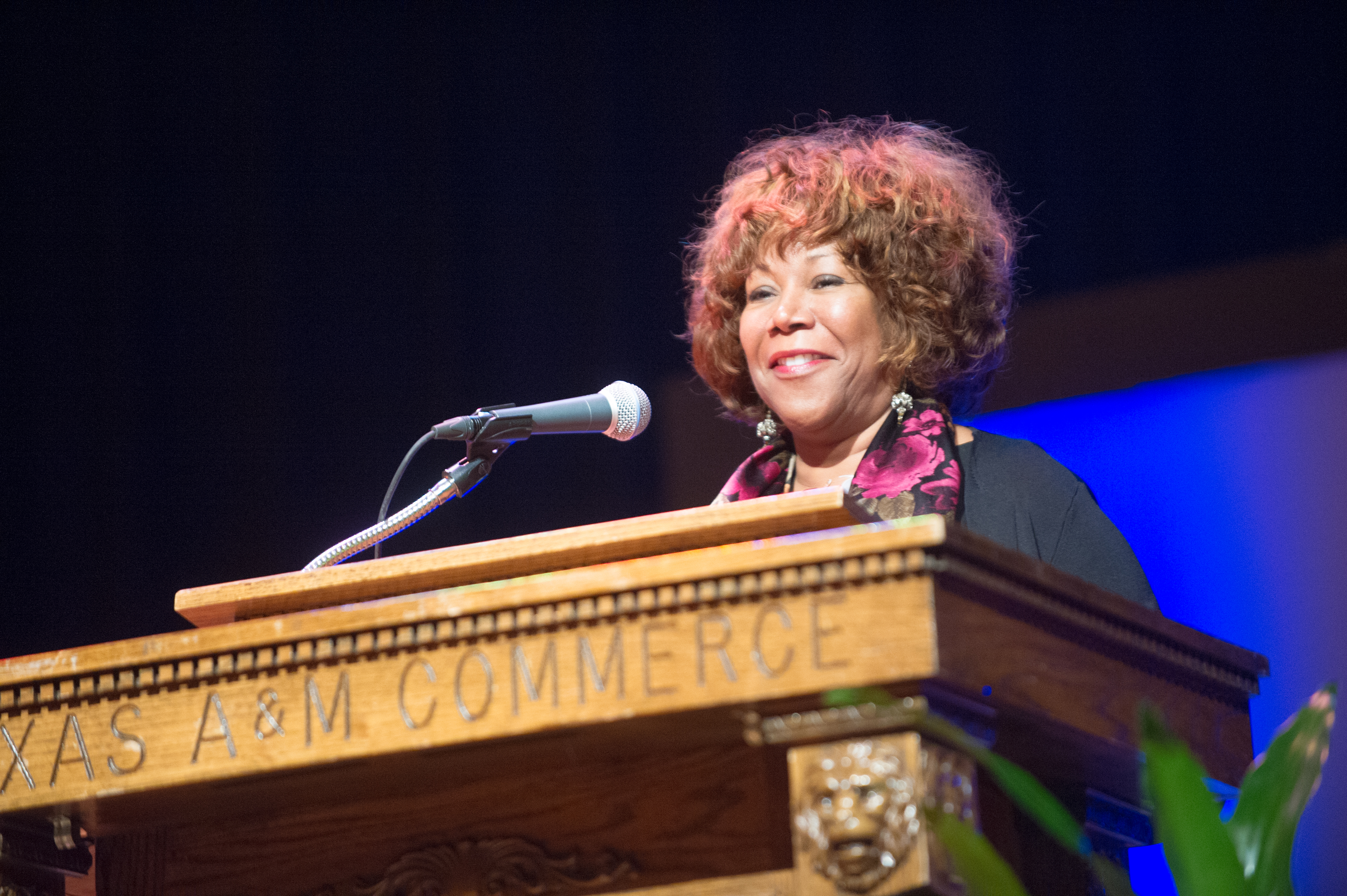
- Bridges speaking at Texas A&M University–Commerce in February 2015
- Born: Ruby Nell Bridges; September 8, 1954 (age 72); Tylertown, Mississippi, U.S.
- Occupations: Philanthropist; activist
- Spouse: Malcolm Hall
- Children: 4
- Website: www.rubybridges.com

Ruby Nell Bridges Hall (born September 8, 1954) is an American civil rights activist. She was the first African American child to attend formerly whites-only William Frantz Elementary School in Louisiana during the New Orleans school desegregation crisis on November 14, 1960. She is the subject of a 1964 painting, The Problem We All Live With, by Norman Rockwell.

== Early life ==
Bridges was the eldest of five children born to Abon and Lucille Bridges. As a child, she spent much time taking care of her younger siblings, though she also enjoyed playing jump rope and softball and climbing trees. When she was four years old, the family relocated from Tylertown, Mississippi, where Bridges was born, to New Orleans, Louisiana. In 1960, when she was six years old, her parents responded to a request from the National Association for the Advancement of Colored People (NAACP) and volunteered her to participate in the integration of the New Orleans school system, even though her father was hesitant.

== Background ==
Bridges was born during the middle of the Civil Rights Movement. Brown v. Board of Education was decided three months and twenty-two days before Bridges's birth. The court ruling declared that the establishment of separate public schools for white children, which black children were barred from attending, was unconstitutional; accordingly, black students were permitted to attend such schools. Though the Brown v. Board of Education decision was finalized in 1954, southern states were extremely resistant to the decision that they must integrate within six years. Many white people did not want schools to be integrated and, though it was a federal ruling, state governments were not doing their part in enforcing the new laws. In 1957, federal troops were ordered to Little Rock, Arkansas, to escort the Little Rock Nine students in combating violence that occurred following the decision. Under significant pressure from the federal government, the Orleans Parish School Board administered an entrance exam to students at Bridges's school with the intention of keeping black children out of white schools.

== Integration ==
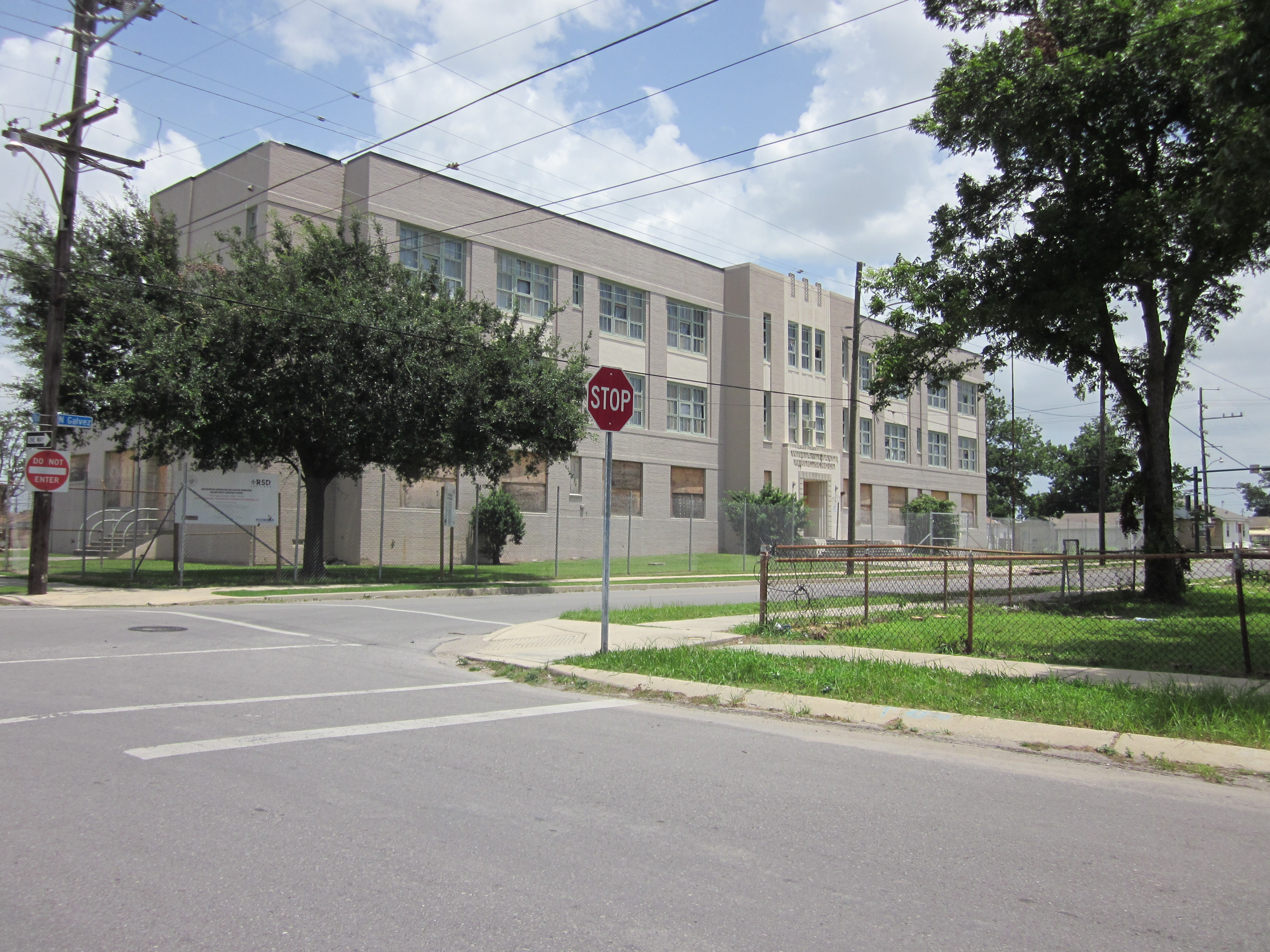
William Frantz Elementary School building in 2010

Bridges attended a segregated kindergarten in 1959. In early 1960, Bridges was one of six black children in New Orleans to pass the test that determined whether they could go to the all-white William Frantz Elementary School. Two of the six decided to stay at their old school, Bridges went to Frantz by herself, and three children (Gail Etienne, Leona Tate and Tessie Prevost) were transferred to the all-white McDonogh No. 19 Elementary School. All four 6-year-old girls were escorted to school by federal marshals during the first day they attended the two schools. In the following days of that year, federal marshals continued to escort them.

Bridges's father was initially reluctant, but her mother felt strongly that the move was needed not only to give her own daughter a better education, but to "take this step forward ... for all African-American children". Her mother finally convinced her father to let her go to the school.

Judge J. Skelly Wright's court order for the first day of integrated schools in New Orleans on Monday, November 14, 1960, was commemorated by Norman Rockwell in the painting, The Problem We All Live With (published in Look magazine on January 14, 1964). As Bridges describes it, "Driving up I could see the crowd, but living in New Orleans, I actually thought it was Mardi Gras. There was a large crowd of people outside of the school. They were throwing things and shouting, and that sort of goes on in New Orleans at Mardi Gras." Former United States Deputy Marshal Charles Burks later recalled, "She showed a lot of courage. She never cried. She didn't whimper. She just marched along like a little soldier, and we're all very very proud of her."

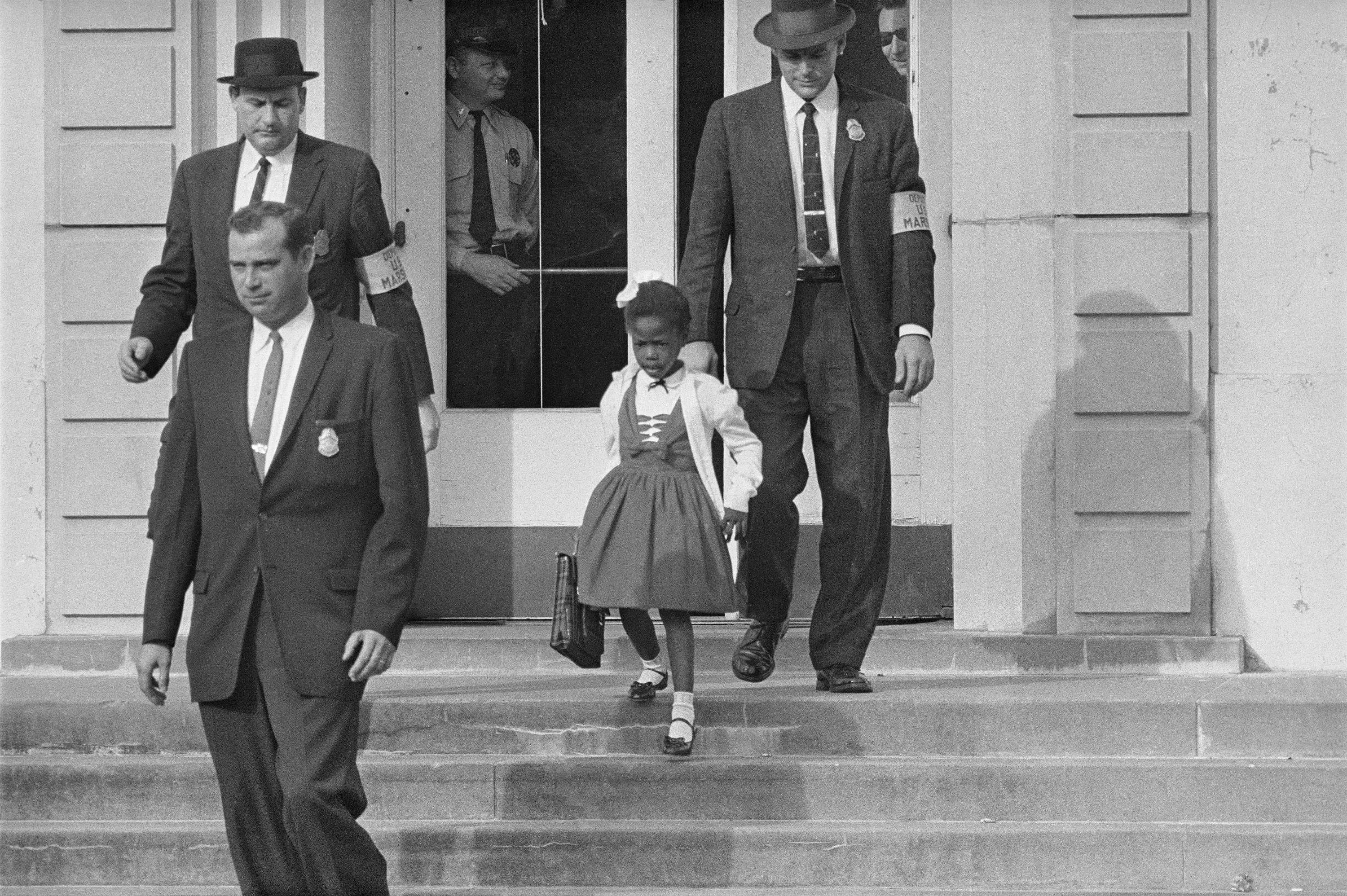
U.S. Marshals escorted Bridges to and from school in 1960

As soon as Bridges entered the school, white parents pulled their own children out; all the teachers except for one refused to teach while a black child was enrolled. Only Barbara Henry, who was from Boston, agreed to teach Bridges, and for over a year Henry taught her alone, "as if she were teaching a whole class."

That first day, Bridges and her mother spent the entire day in the principal's office; the chaos of the school prevented their moving to the classroom until the second day. On the second day, however, a white student broke the boycott and entered the school when a 34-year-old Methodist minister, Lloyd Anderson Foreman, walked his five-year-old daughter Pam through the angry mob, saying, "I simply want the privilege of taking my child to school". A few days later, other white parents began bringing their children, and the protests began to subside.

Yet Bridges remained the only child in her class, as she would until the following year. Every morning, as Bridges walked to school, one woman would threaten to poison her, while another held up a black baby doll in a coffin. This led the U.S. Marshals dispatched to oversee her safety to only allow Bridges to eat the food that she brought from home, and she was not allowed to participate in recess.

Child psychiatrist Robert Coles volunteered to provide counseling to Bridges during her first year at Frantz. He met with her weekly in the Bridges home, and in 1995 wrote a children's book, The Story of Ruby Bridges, to acquaint other children with Bridges's story. Coles donated the royalties from the sale of that book to the Ruby Bridges Foundation, to provide money for school supplies or other educational needs for impoverished New Orleans school children.

The Bridges family suffered for their decision to send her to William Frantz Elementary: her father lost his job as a gas station attendant; the grocery store the family shopped at would no longer let them shop there; her grandparents, who were sharecroppers in Mississippi, were turned off their land; and Abon and Lucille Bridges separated.

Bridges has noted that many others in the community, both black and white, showed support in a variety of ways. Some white families continued to send their children to Frantz despite the protests, a neighbor provided her father with a new job, and local people babysat, watched the house as protectors, and walked behind the federal marshals' car on the trips to school. It was not until Bridges was an adult that she learned that the immaculate clothing she wore to school in those first weeks at Frantz was sent to her family by a relative of Coles. Bridges says her family could never have afforded the dresses, socks, and shoes that are documented in photographs of her escort by U.S. Marshals to and from the school.

== Adult life ==
As of 2004, Bridges, now Ruby Bridges Hall, still lived in New Orleans with her husband, Malcolm Hall, and their four sons. After graduating from a desegregated high school, she worked as a travel agent for 15 years and later became a full-time parent. She is now chair of the Ruby Bridges Foundation, which she formed in 1999 to promote "the values of tolerance, respect, and appreciation of all differences". Describing the mission of the group, she says, "racism is a grown-up disease and we must stop using our children to spread it."

Bridges is the subject of the Lori McKenna song "Ruby's Shoes". Her childhood struggle at William Frantz Elementary School was portrayed in the 1998 made-for-TV movie Ruby Bridges. The young Bridges was portrayed by actress Chaz Monet, and the movie also featured Lela Rochon as Bridges's mother, Lucille "Lucy" Bridges; Michael Beach as Bridges's father, Abon Bridges; Penelope Ann Miller as Bridges's teacher, Mrs. Henry; and Kevin Pollak as Dr. Robert Coles.

Like hundreds of thousands of others in the greater New Orleans area, Bridges lost her home (in Eastern New Orleans) to catastrophic flooding from the failure of the levee system during Hurricane Katrina in 2005. Hurricane Katrina also greatly damaged William Frantz Elementary School, and Bridges played a significant role in fighting for the school to remain open.

In November 2007, the Children's Museum of Indianapolis unveiled a new permanent exhibit documenting her life, along with the lives of Anne Frank and Ryan White. The exhibit, called "The Power of Children: Making a Difference", cost $6 million to install and includes an authentic re-creation of Bridges's first grade classroom.

In 2010, Bridges had a 50th year reunion at William Frantz Elementary with Pam Foreman Testroet, who had been, at the age of five, the first white child to break the boycott that ensued from Bridges's attendance at that school.

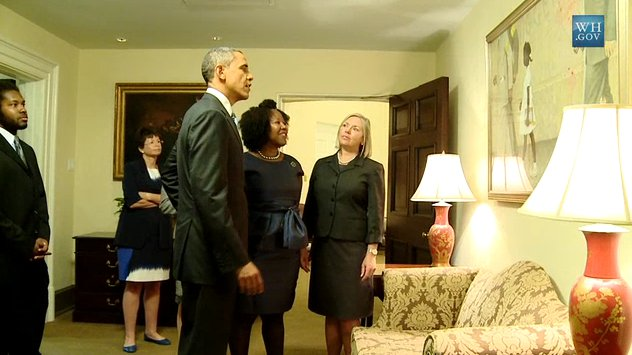
Bridges and President Barack Obama view the painting by Rockwell in the White House. (video)

On July 15, 2011, Bridges met with President Barack Obama at the White House, and while viewing the Norman Rockwell painting of her on display he told her, "I think it's fair to say that if it hadn't been for you guys, I might not be here and we wouldn't be looking at this together". The Rockwell painting was displayed in the West Wing of the White House, just outside the Oval Office, from June through October 2011.

== Awards and honors ==
In September 1995, Bridges and Robert Coles were awarded honorary degrees from Connecticut College and appeared together in public for the first time to accept the awards.

Bridges's Through My Eyes won the Carter G. Woodson Book Award in 2000.

On August 10, 2000, the 40-year anniversary of her walk into William Frantz Elementary School, Deputy Attorney General Eric Holder made Ruby Bridges an Honorary Deputy U.S. Marshal.

On January 8, 2001, Bridges was awarded the Presidential Citizens Medal by President Bill Clinton.

In November 2006, Bridges was honored as a "Hero Against Racism" at the 12th annual Anti-Defamation League "Concert Against Hate" with the National Symphony Orchestra, held at the Kennedy Center in Washington, DC.

On May 19, 2012, Bridges received an honorary degree from Tulane University at the annual graduation ceremony at the Superdome.

On November 14, 2014, the 54th anniversary of Bridges' watershed moment was commemorated at Akili Academy, which was formerly the William Frantz School, and a statue was unveiled in her honor; retired U.S. Deputy Marshal Charlie Burks, who had escorted her to school in 1960, was in attendance.

On February 4, 2016, Bridges was the recipient of the John Steinbeck Award at San Jose State University. The award is given to those who capture "Steinbeck’s empathy, commitment to democratic values, and belief in the dignity of people who by circumstance are pushed to the fringes.

On November 9, 2023, Bridges was awarded the Robert Coles Call of Service Award by the Phillips Brooks House Association at Harvard University, and gave the corresponding lecture at Memorial Church.

On March 5, 2024, Bridges was inducted into the National Women's Hall of Fame. The induction ceremony honored Bridges alongside renowned tennis player Serena Williams. This recognition highlights Bridges's significant contributions to civil rights and education in the United States.

Two elementary schools are named after Bridges: one in Alameda, California, and another in Woodinville, Washington. A statue of Bridges stands in the courtyard of William Frantz Elementary School. When asked what she hopes children will feel when seeing the statue, she responded:

I think kids will look at it and think to themselves, 'I can do something great too.' Kids can do anything, and I want them to be able to see themselves in the statue. Hopefully that will remind [them that they] can change the world.

A street in Esch-sur-Alzette, Luxembourg, is named after Bridges.

== Published works ==
- Bridges, Ruby (1999). Through My Eyes (1st ed.). New York: Scholastic Press. ISBN 0590189239. OCLC 40588556.
- Bridges, Ruby (2009). Ruby Bridges Goes to School: My True Story. New York: Scholastic Press. ISBN 9780545108553. OCLC 230915434.
- Bridges, Ruby (2020). This Is Your Time. New York: Delacorte Press. ISBN 9780593378526.
- Bridges, Ruby (2022). I Am Ruby Bridges: How One Six-Year-Old Girl's March to School Changed the World. Illustrator: Nikkolas Smith. New York: Orchard Books. ISBN 9781338753882. OCLC 1268545501.

== See also ==
- Dorothy Counts
- Delois Huntley
- Little Rock Nine
- New Orleans school desegregation crisis
