= Desegregated public schools in New Orleans =

Public schools in New Orleans, Louisiana, were desegregated to a significant degree for a period of almost seven years during the Reconstruction Era following the Civil War of the United States. Desegregation of this scale was not seen again in the Southern United States until after the 1954 federal court ruling Brown v. Board of Education established that segregated facilities were unconstitutional. There had previously been attempts by the free black community to integrate schools in New Orleans in 1862, following its Union occupation during the Civil War.

The 1867 Louisiana constitution, with its provision that racial segregation was no longer to be permitted in public facilities, marked the beginning of three years of legal wrangling and evasion by whites resistant to the idea of integrated schools. A December 1870 court decision on school desegregation was recognized by both sides of the issue as decisive, and integration of New Orleans's public schools began in earnest in 1870.

Despite initial vocal opposition to integrated schools, particularly from white communities, and predictions by mass media of the public school system's collapse in New Orleans, enrollment ultimately increased, and the performance of both Black and white students improved in desegregated schools during the brief period when these institutions flourished. At the peak of this movement, roughly one-third of New Orleans public schools were significantly desegregated, and these schools emerged as the top performers in their districts.

Opposition to desegregated schools persisted among some white communities despite their success. Opponents of interracial cooperation used varied tactics, from newspaper editorials to political posturing to violence, to express their point of view. In mid-1974, a congressional civil rights bill removed from the constitution the clause of desegregated schools, thus weakening the position of New Orleans's burgeoning desegregated public school system.

The Louisiana constitution was revised in 1879 to permit segregated public institutions once more. In 1898, further amendments completely banned desegregated public facilities.

== See also ==
- New Orleans school desegregation crisis
- Ruby Bridges
- Bibliography of the Reconstruction Era#Louisiana
