= William Frantz Elementary School =

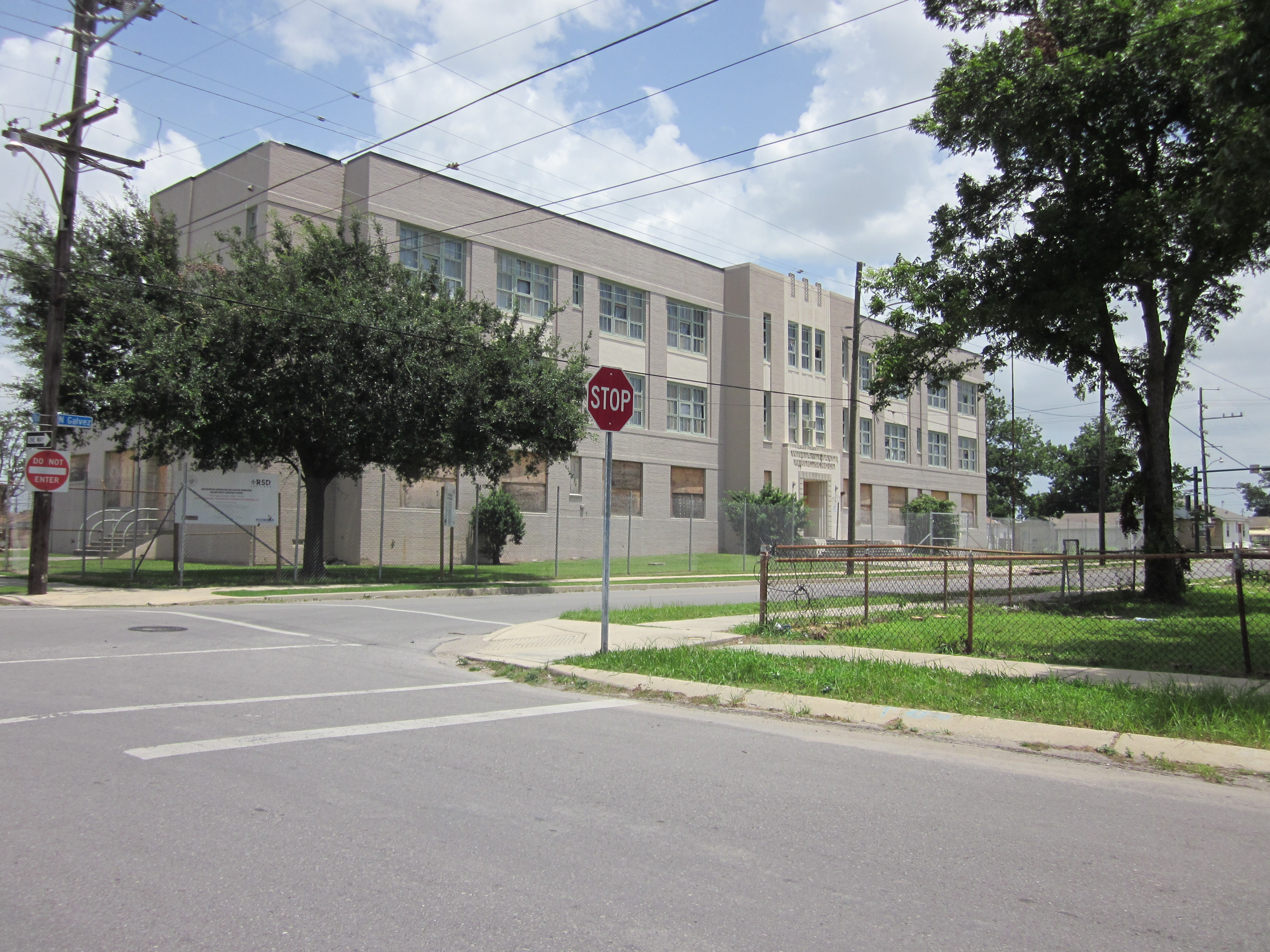
- William Frantz Elementary School in 2010

Location
- 3811 North Galvez Street; New Orleans, Louisiana 70117; United States

Information
- School type: Elementary school

- William Frantz School
- U.S. National Register of Historic Places
- Location within Louisiana
- Coordinates: 29°58′35″N 90°02′01″W
- Area: less than one acre
- Built: 1937
- Built by: Herman T. Makofsky
- Architect: E.A. Christy
- Architectural style: Art Deco
- NRHP reference No.: 05000557
- Added to NRHP: June 8, 2005

William Frantz Elementary School is an American elementary school located at 3811 North Galvez Street, New Orleans, Louisiana, 70117. Along with McDonogh No. 19 Elementary School, it was involved in the New Orleans school desegregation crisis during 1960.

William Frantz Elementary School was one of the first all-white elementary schools in the Deep South to be integrated when Ruby Bridges became the first African-American student to attend the school. In 1960, when Bridges was six years of age, her parents responded to a request from the National Association for the Advancement of Colored People (NAACP) and volunteered her to participate in the integration of the New Orleans school system.

The school was built in 1937. It was designed in understated Art Deco style by the school board's architect E.A. Christy. It was listed on the National Register of Historic Places in 2005 as William Frantz School.

In 2014, a statue of Ruby Bridges was unveiled in the courtyard of William Frantz Elementary School.

== Integration ==
In summer of 1960, Ruby Bridges was one of six African-American children in New Orleans to pass the test that determined whether or not the black children would go to the all-white school. However, two students decided to stay at their old school, and three were transferred to Mcdonogh No. 19. Ruby was the only one assigned to William Frantz. Her father was initially reluctant, but her mother felt strongly that the move was needed not only to give her own daughter a better education, but to "take this step forward ... for all African-American children." Her mother finally convinced her father to let her go to the school.

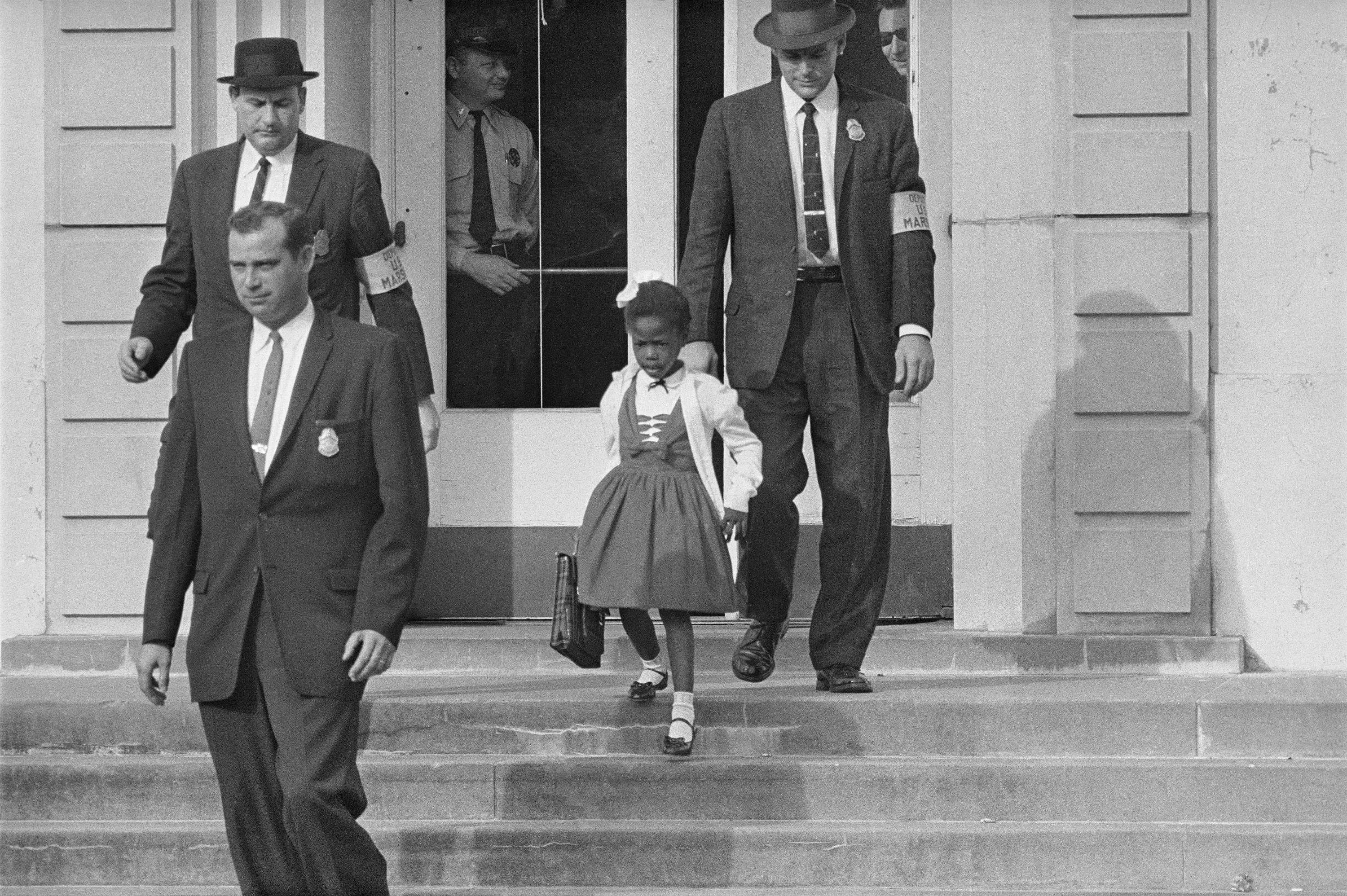
U.S. Marshals escort Ruby Bridges

The court-ordered first day of integrated schools in New Orleans, November 14, 1960, was commemorated by Norman Rockwell in the painting The Problem We All Live With. As Bridges describes it, "Driving up I could see the crowd, but living in New Orleans, I actually thought it was Mardi Gras. There was a large crowd of people outside of the school. They were throwing things and shouting, and that sort of goes on in New Orleans at Mardi Gras." Former United States Deputy Marshal Charles Burks later recalled, "She showed a lot of courage. She never cried. She didn't whimper. She just marched along like a little soldier, and we're all very very proud of her."

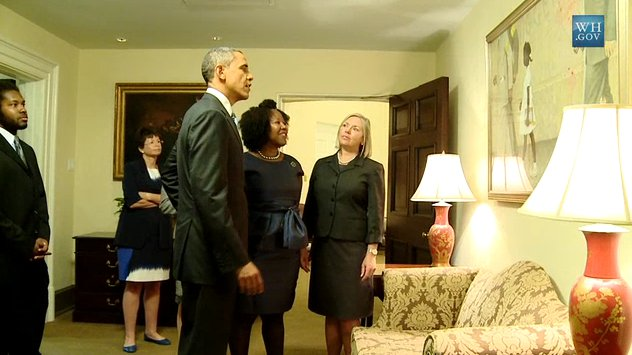
Ruby Bridges meets with President Barack Obama (video)

The Problem We All Live With was later displayed in the White House during the presidency of Barack Obama.

== Post-integration ==
In 2005 Frantz was put on the National Register of Historic Places. In 2005 New Orleans Public Schools was considering closing Frantz at the same time Hurricane Katrina resulted in extensive damage to the building due to five feet of water flooding on the ground floor. The school underwent a $23.5 million rehabilitation project. As part of it, room 2306 (the first grade classroom Bridges attended) was restored "to match its original 1960s appearance to honor Ruby and her story."

Once reopened, the building hosted the charter school Akili Academy until it was merged with another charter school. It then became the high school campus for Morris Jeff Community School, Louisiana’s only PK-12 International Baccalaureate World School.

== See also ==
- Ruby Bridges, 1998 film
