= Soundtrack for a Revolution =

British documentary

- Promotional film poster
- Directed by: Bill Guttentag; Dan Sturman
- Written by: Bill Guttentag; Dan Sturman
- Produced by: Joslyn Barnes; Jim Czarnecki; Bill Guttentag; Dylan Nelson; Dan Sturman
- Starring: The Roots; John Legend; Wyclef Jean
- Cinematography: Buddy Squires; Jon Else; Stephen Kazmierski
- Edited by: Jeffrey Doe
- Music by: Phil Marshall
- Release date: 2009
- Running time: 86 minutes
- Countries: United States; France; United Kingdom
- Language: English

Soundtrack for a Revolution is a 2009 documentary film written and directed by Bill Guttentag and Dan Sturman. This documentary traces the story of the Civil Rights Movement and the gains achieved by young African-American activists with an emphasis on their use of the power of music. Soundtrack for a Revolution had its international premiere at the Cannes Film Festival and its North American premiere at the Tribeca Film Festival. Soundtrack for a Revolution was selected by the Academy of Motion Picture Arts and Sciences as part of the Oscar shortlist for the Documentary Feature category of the 82nd Academy Awards. Guttentag and Sturman were nominated for Best Documentary Screenplay from the Writers Guild of America. The film has screened at numerous festivals including Cannes, Tribeca, IDFA and Sheffield Doc/Fest.

== Music ==
Guttentag and Sturman had contemporary artists interpret the music and the messages of the Civil Rights Movement including Wyclef Jean, John Legend, Joss Stone and The Roots. John Legend sang "Woke Up This Morning", Richie Havens sang "Will the Circle be Unbroken", The Roots sang "Ain't Gonna Let Nobody Turn Me Around", Joss Stone sang "Keep Your Eyes on the Prize" and Wyclef Jean sang "Here's to the State of Mississippi" by Phil Ochs.

== Cast ==
- The Roots - Themselves (performers)
- John Legend - Himself (performer)
- Wyclef Jean - Himself (performer)
- Joss Stone - Herself (performer)
- Richie Havens - Himself (performer)
- Anthony Hamilton - Himself (performer)
- The Blind Boys of Alabama - Themselves (performers)
- Angie Stone - Herself (performer)
- Mary Mary - Themselves (performers)
- TV On The Radio - Themselves (performers)
- Harry Belafonte - Himself (interviewee)
- John Lewis - Himself (interviewee)
- Lula Joe Willams - Herself (interviewee)
- Andrew Young - Himself (interviewee)
- Lynda Lowery - Herself (interviewee)

== Reception ==
On the review aggregator website Rotten Tomatoes, 81% of 16 critics' reviews are positive.

== See also ==
- Civil rights movement in popular culture
- Freedom songs
