= Rosa Parks (disambiguation) =

Rosa Parks (1913–2005) was an American civil rights activist.

Rosa Parks may also refer to:

== Education ==
- The Rosa Parks Institute or Rosa and Raymond Parks Institute for Self Development, a youth organization in Detroit, Michigan
- Rosa L. Parks Scholarship Foundation, a foundation in Michigan
- Rosa Parks Middle School, a school in Montgomery County, Maryland
- Rosa L. Parks School of Fine and Performing Arts, a high school in Paterson, New Jersey
- Rosa Parks/Millbrook Elementary School (Lancaster, Texas)

== Transportation ==
- Rosa Parks station (Paris), France, a railway station
- Rosa Parks Transit Station, a people-mover station in Jacksonville, Florida
- Rosa Parks Transit Center, a bus terminal in the Capitol Park Historic District of Detroit, Michigan
- Rosa Parks Hempstead Transit Center for the Nassau Inter-County Express system, New York
- Rosa Parks station (TriMet), a light rail station in Portland, Oregon
- Rosa Parks Freeway, a portion of Interstate 10 in California
- Rosa Parks Memorial Highway, the portion of Interstate 96 that cuts through the city of Detroit

== Other uses ==
- "Rosa Parks" (song), a 1998 hip hop song
- Rosa Parks (National Statuary Hall), a 2013 bronze sculpture
- Statue of Rosa Parks (Eugene, Oregon), a sculpture in Eugene, Oregon
- Rosa Parks Act, a 2006 act of the Alabama legislature
- Rosa Parks Circle, a plaza in downtown Grand Rapids, Michigan
- 284996_Rosaparks, a dark background asteroid

== See also ==
- "Rosa" (Doctor Who), an episode of Doctor Who
- Rosa Parks Highway (disambiguation)
- Rosa Parks v. LaFace Records, a 1999 lawsuit filed on behalf of Rosa Parks in reaction to the Outkast song "Rosa Parks"
