= As the Crow Flies =

As the Crow Flies may refer to:

- As the crow flies, an idiom for the shortest distance between two points
- As the Crow Flies (album), by the Advisory Circle
- As the Crow Flies (EP), by Amos Lee
- As the Crow Flies (novel), by Jeffrey Archer
- As the Crow Flies (play), by David Henry Hwang
- As the Crow Flies, a translation of the poetry collection A vol d'oiseau by Véronique Tadjo
- As the Crow Flies, a children's book by Elizabeth Winthrop
- As the Crow Flies, a webcomic by Melanie Gillman
- "As the Crow Flies", a Batman story arc
- "As the Crow Flies", a 2019 Electron launch by Rocket Lab

== See also ==
- Three Days as the Crow Flies, a novel by Danny Simmons
