= Blache =

Blache is a surname. Notable people with the surname include:

- Christian Blache (1838–1920) - Danish painter
- Greg Blache (born 1949) - American football coach
- Gustave Blache III (born 1977) - American artist
- Herbert Blaché (1882–1953) - British American film director, producer, and screenwriter
- Jean-Baptiste Blache (1765–1834) - German ballet dancer and ballet master

== See also ==
- Alice Guy-Blaché (1873–1968), French film director
