= Freedom song =

Songs sung by participants in the civil rights movement

Freedom songs were songs which were sung by participants in the civil rights movement. They are also called "civil rights anthems" or, in the case of songs which are more hymn-like, they are called "civil rights hymns."

Freedom songs were an important feature of the way of life which existed during the civil rights movement. The songs contained many meanings for all of the participants in the civil rights movement. Songs could embody sadness, happiness, joy, or determination among many other feelings. Freedom songs served as mechanisms for unity in the black community during the movement. The songs also served as a means of communication among the movement's participants when words were not enough. The song "We Shall Overcome" quickly became the unofficial anthem of the movement. Guy Carawan taught the popular freedom song during the spring of 1960 in a workshop held at Highlander Folk School, making the song extremely popular within the community.

Music of the civil rights era was crucial to the productivity of the movement. Music communicated unspeakable feelings and the desire for radical change across the nation. Music strengthened the movement, adding variety to different freedom progression strategies. Music was highly successful in that the songs were direct and repetitive, clearly and efficiently getting the message across. The melodies were simple with repetitious choruses, which allowed easy involvement within both black and white communities, furthering the spread of their message. There was often more singing than talking during protests and demonstrations, showing how powerful the songs really were. Nurturing those who came to participate in the movement was vital, and it would be done with songs. Participants in the movement felt a sense of connectedness with one another and through the songs, they also felt a sense of connectedness with the movement. Politically, freedom songs were often sung in order to grab the attention of the nation and force it to address the severity of racial segregation in the United States.

Frequently, the songs had a Christian background, they were usually based on hymns. The words of hymns were slightly altered so their wording could be incorporated into civil rights protests, and reflect current situations as they were sung outside churches, particularly in the streets. Although most freedom songs were derived from hymns, some freedom songs were also derived from other genres. In order to accommodate people who were not very religious, rock and roll songs were altered and turned into freedom songs, this allowed a large number of activists to partake in the singing.

In several cases, these songs began as gospel songs or spirituals, and some of the most famous of these songs were "We Shall Overcome," "This Little Light of Mine", and "Go Tell it on the Mountain".

Nina Simone and other professional artists are also known for either writing or singing such songs. Two of these songs are:

- "Mississippi Goddam", from Nina Simone in Concert (1964).
- "To Be Young, Gifted and Black", from Black Gold (1970).

Activist Fannie Lou Hamer is known for singing songs at marches or other types of protests, particularly "This Little Light of Mine." Zilphia Horton also played a role in the conversion of spirituals to civil rights songs.

== Notable songs from the civil rights movement ==
Some 100 or so songs were commonly sung during the Civil Rights Movement protests of the 1960s. Some of the best-known or the most-influential songs are:

- "A Change Is Gonna Come (song)": Composed and performed by Sam Cooke; #12 on the 500 Greatest Songs of All Time list of Rolling Stone magazine
- "Oh, Freedom": a spiritual dating back to slavery times
- "Ain't Gonna Let Nobody Turn Me 'Round"
- "Keep Your Eyes on the Prize"
- "Certainly Lord": based on a spiritual
- "Hold On" (also known as "Keep Your Eye On The Prize"): Based on a spiritual
- "How I Got Over"
- "I Love Everybody", the most important song in the civil rights movement according to SCLC's James Bevel and Andrew Young, sometimes sung for an hour at a time.
- "If You Miss Me at the Back of the Bus": Adapted from a composition by Chico Neblett
- "I'm Gonna Sit at the Welcome Table": Adapted from a Spiritual
- "I Woke Up This Mornin'": Adapted from a Spiritual
- "Lift Ev'ry Voice and Sing": Composed by James Weldon Johnson
- "This Little Light of Mine": Originally a spiritual, associated with Fannie Lou Hamer.
- "We shall not be moved": Also, likely originally, a labor union song.
- "If I had a hammer": A labor union song by Pete Seeger and Lee Hays.
- "Hymn to Freedom": Composed and performed by Oscar Peterson on the album Night Train

== See also ==
- Civil rights movement in popular culture
- Music in the movement against apartheid
- Soundtrack for a Revolution (2009), a documentary which focuses on some of the songs sung during the civil rights movement.
- "Strange Fruit" was a significant anti-racist protest song made famous by Billie Holiday in 1939.

== Bibliography ==
- Everybody Says Freedom, by Pete Seeger & Bob Reiser. Norton, 1989
- When the Spirit Says Sing! The Role of Freedom Songs in the Civil Rights Movement, by Kerran Sanger. Taylor & Francis Inc, 1995
- Sing for Freedom: the Story of the Civil Rights Movement Through its Songs, by Guy and Candie Carawan, Sing Out Corporation 1990
- Goertzen, Chris. "Freedom Songs." Folklore: An Encyclopedia of Beliefs, Customs, Tales, Music, and Art. Ed. Charlie T. McCormick and Kim Kennedy White. 2nd ed. Vol. 2. Santa Barbara, CA: ABC-CLIO, 2011. 586–588. Gale Virtual Reference Library. Web. 13 May 2014.
