= Woke Up This Morning (disambiguation) =

"Woke Up This Morning" is a song by British band Alabama 3 from their 1997 album Exile on Coldharbour Lane.

"Woke Up This Morning" may also refer to:

- "Woke Up This Morning (With My Mind Stayed On Freedom)", a 1960s folk song
- "Woke Up This Morning", a song by Lightnin' Hopkins from the album Lightnin' Strikes, 1966
- "Woke Up This Morning", a song by Nazareth from the album Razamanaz, 1973
- "Woke Up This Morning", a song by Nickelback from the album Silver Side Up, 2001
- Woke Up This Morning: The Definitive Oral History of The Sopranos, a book by Michael Imperioli and Steve Schirripa based on their podcast Talking Sopranos
- "Woke Up This Morning", a song by Nathan Davis Jr, 2025
  - "Woke Up This Morning", a remix featuring Forrest Frank included on his album Child of God II, 2025
- "Woke Up This Morning and Found Myself Dead", a song recorded by Jimi Hendrix and unofficially released on the album Bleeding Heart, 1994
