= Colored Frames =

- Directed by: Lerone D. Wilson
- Produced by: Nonso Christian Ugbode
- Starring: Benny Andrews; Ed Clark; Marva Huston; Ann Tanksley; Mary Schmidt Campbell; Gustave Blache III; Francks Deceus; Danny Simmons
- Edited by: Lerone D. Wilson
- Music by: Magali Souriau; Lenae Harris
- Distributed by: Microcinema International
- Release date: February 27, 2007
- Running time: 56 minutes
- Country: United States
- Language: English

Colored Frames is a 2007 documentary film taking a look at the role of fine art in the Civil Rights Movement, as well as the legacy of discrimination in the art community both historically and contemporarily. The documentary is a showcase of a wide variety of works primarily by African-American artists, and a discussion of modern sociopolitical topics focused on race, gender, and class. Beginning in late 2011 the film began airing nationally in the U.S. via American Public Television.

Artists who appeared on camera in this documentary included:

- Benny Andrews
- John Ashford
- Gustave Blache III
- Marva Huston
- Linda Goode Bryant
- Mary Schmidt Campbell
- Nanette Carter
- Ed Clark
- Francks Deceus
- Larry Hampton
- Gordon C. James
- June Kelly of the June Kelly Gallery
- Wangechi Mutu
- Ron Ollie
- Danny Simmons
- Duane Smith
- Tafa

== See also ==
- Civil rights movement in popular culture
