= Rose Park =

Rose Park may refer to:

- Rose Park, South Australia, a suburb of Adelaide, South Australia, Australia
- Rose Park, Long Beach, California, a neighborhood in Long Beach, California, United States
- Rose Park, Salt Lake City, Utah, a neighborhood in Salt Lake City, Utah, United States

== See also ==
- E. S. Rose Park, a sports venue in Nashville, Tennessee, United States
- Roseanne Park or Rosé, member of the South Korean girl group Blackpink
- Rosa Parks (disambiguation)
