= Celestine Cook =

African American businesswoman, community and political activist

Celestine Cook (1924 – 1985 in New Orleans) was an African American businesswoman, and community and political activist. She was the first African American to serve on the National Business Committee of the Arts.

== Early life and education ==
Celestine Strode Cook was born in 1924 in Teague, Texas. Her father worked for the Rock Island Railroad as a machinist and her mother was a housewife. Cook graduated from Jack Yates High School in Houston and went on to receive her undergraduate degree in physical education in 1944 from the Tuskegee Institute in Alabama.

== Career ==
Cook was a teacher for Houston public schools until her first husband, Bethel J. Strode, died in 1947. Cook was 24 with two children, Bethel Strode, Jr., and Bethelynn Strode. She took over the properties and investments that her husband had in Illinois and Texas, serving as the president of his estate. From 1949 to 1953, she was a member of the board for the City of Galveston Recreation and Park. In the mid-1950s, she married her second husband, Jessie W. Cook, a Good Citizen’s Life Insurance company executive, and they moved to New Orleans.

In New Orleans, Cook worked as the executive secretary for the Good Citizens Life Insurance Company and Good Citizens Funeral Systems Inc. In 1972, she was elected to serve on the Board of Directors for the Liberty Bank and Trust Company, making her the only African American woman serving on the board of a New Orleans bank at the time.

Cook was politically active and worked on several campaigns. She was involved with the campaigns for Dorothy Mae Taylor, Mayor Moon Landrieu, Rose Loving, and Congresswoman Lindy Boggs. Mayor Moon Landrieu appointed her to the Cultural Resources Committee in 1971 and she was also appointed by Governor John McKeithen to the Committee on Employment of the Physically Handicapped. In 1982, she worked with Mayor Dutch Morial’s re-election campaign, serving as the chairwoman of the Women’s Committee.

Cook was the first African American and second woman to serve on the National Business Committee of the Arts. She was president of the New Orleans Links.

== Community involvement ==
Cook was heavily involved in the New Orleans community, and active in the cultural, political, social, and economic realms of the city. Cook was committed to providing assistance to young artists.

She served on the board of several different organizations including the 1984 World’s Fair in New Orleans, the New Orleans Museum of Art, the Business Arts Council, the Bayou Classic, and the Louisiana Division of the Arts.

Cook encouraged other African American women to be involved in the community and introduced them to African American artists. She urged Leah Chase to consider joining the New Orleans Museum of Art’s (NOMA) board of trustees. Chase joined and was later invited to become a trustee for life.

Her civic activities also involved serving as a trustee for Loyola University, Amistad Research Center, and NOMA.

She was involved with organizations such as the Methodist Church, New Orleans Museum of Art (NOMA), Zeta Phi Beta sorority, Friends of the Free Southern Theater, the Arts Council of New Orleans, the Women’s Auxiliary of Flint-Goodridge Hospital, New Orleans chapter of the Links, and the Tuskegee Alumni Association.

== Awards and honors ==
In 1955, Cook was awarded the Tuskegee Institute Alumni Merit Award and Zeta Phi Beta’s Woman of the Year.
