= Civil rights movement in popular culture =

The history of the 1954 to 1968 American civil rights movement has been depicted and documented in film, song, theater, television, and the visual arts. These presentations add to and maintain cultural awareness and understanding of the goals, tactics, and accomplishments of the people who organized and participated in this nonviolent movement.

== Film ==
=== Documentaries ===
- Crisis: Behind a Presidential Commitment (1963), first-hand journalistic reporting of the University of Alabama "Stand in the Schoolhouse Door" integration crisis of June 1963.
- Nine from Little Rock (1964), about the Little Rock Nine who enrolled in an all-white Arkansas high school in 1957.
- The March (1964), about the 1963 March on Washington, was made for the United States Information Agency.
- Louisiana Diary (1964) follows the Congress of Racial Equality (CORE) from July to August 1963, as they undertake an African American voter registration drive in Plaquemine, Louisiana.
- Cicero March (1966), details a civil rights march held by the Congress of Racial Equality on September 4, 1966, in Cicero, Illinois, soon after the 1966 Chicago open housing movement ended.
- King: A Filmed Record... Montgomery to Memphis (1970)
- Malcolm X (1972), based on The Autobiography of Malcolm X.
- Freedom on My Mind (1994), documents efforts to register African-American voters in Mississippi, Freedom Summer, and the formation of the Mississippi Freedom Democratic Party.
- A Time for Justice (1994), a short history of the civil rights movement narrated by Julian Bond.
- 4 Little Girls (1997), focusing on the 1963 events surrounding the bombing of the 16th Street Baptist Church just after the Birmingham campaign.
- Mighty Times: The Legacy of Rosa Parks (2002), created with archival footage
- February One: The Story of the Greensboro Four (2003), documents the 1960 Greensboro lunch counter sit-ins and the four college students involved.
- The Murder of Emmett Till (2003) about the murder and the impact of Emmett Till's open-casket funeral.
- Brother Outsider: The Life of Bayard Rustin (2003), about the life of civil rights organizer Bayard Rustin.
- Home of the Brave (2004), documents the life and murder of Viola Liuzzo which occurred just after her participation in the 1965 Selma to Montgomery march.
- Mighty Times: The Children's March (2004) about the 1963 Birmingham campaign and its Children's Crusade marches by schoolchildren.
- Dare Not Walk Alone (2006) focuses on the 1964 St. Augustine movement.
- Mississippi Cold Case (2007), chronicles the Ku Klux Klan murders of two young black men in Mississippi in 1964 during Freedom Summer, and the 21st-century quest for justice by the brother of one of those murdered.
- Colored Frames (2007), art within the civil rights movement.
- The Witness: From the Balcony of Room 306 (2008), details the events surrounding the assassination of Martin Luther King Jr. at the Lorraine Motel in Memphis, Tennessee.
- Neshoba (2008), chronicles the events and thinking in Neshoba County, Mississippi, 40 years after the 1964 murders of Chaney, Goodman, and Schwerner.
- Soundtrack for a Revolution (2009), focuses on some of the songs sung during the civil rights movement.
- Crossing in St. Augustine (2010), produced by Andrew Young, who participated in the civil rights movement in St. Augustine in 1964.
- The Barber of Birmingham (2011), about James Armstrong, a voting rights activist and an original flag bearer for the 1965 Selma to Montgomery marches.
- Julian Bond: Reflections from the Frontlines of the Civil Rights Movement (2012), on the life and thoughts of activist Julian Bond.
- The March (2013), documents the 1963 March on Washington and the "I Have a Dream" speech by King.
- Freedom Summer (2014), documents the events of the 1964 Mississippi Freedom Summer movement.
- In the Hour of Chaos (2016), film about Martin Luther King Sr.
- I Am Not Your Negro (2016), James Baldwin's reminiscences of civil rights movement participants.
- King in the Wilderness (2018), focuses on the last two years of Dr. King's life.
- John Lewis: Good Trouble (2020), on the life of activist, SNCC leader, and congressman John Lewis.
- MLK/FBI (2020), an account of the FBI's investigation and harassment of Martin Luther King Jr.

=== Dramatizations ===
- Mississippi Burning (1988), about the 1964 murders of Chaney, Goodman, and Schwerner in Mississippi.
- Hairspray (1988, 2007 remake), features a major subplot about civil rights movement era demonstrations against racial segregation in Baltimore, Maryland.
- The Long Walk Home (1990), portrays a woman who is boycotting city buses during the 1955-1956 Montgomery bus boycott.
- Malcolm X (1992), a biopic focused on the life and assassination of Malcolm X.
- Ghosts of Mississippi (1996), an account of the assassination of Mississippi activist Medgar Evers and the subsequent investigation.
- Ruby Bridges (1998), is based on the true story of Ruby Bridges, a six-year-old girl who integrated William Frantz Elementary School in New Orleans, Louisiana, in 1960.
- Selma, Lord, Selma (1999), follows the life of 11-year-old Sheyann Webb during the events leading up to the 1965 Selma to Montgomery march and its "Bloody Sunday".
- Our Friend, Martin (1999), fictionalized animated time-travel film which depicts Martin Luther King Jr. at several key points during the civil rights movement.
- Boycott (2001), depicts some of the events of the 1955-56 Montgomery bus boycott.
- The Rosa Parks Story (2002), the life of the key figure in the Montgomery bus boycott.
- The Butler (2013), a scene depicts a civil rights movement training session conducted during the Nashville Student Movement by James Lawson and other civil rights movement events.
- Selma (2014), focusing on the events leading up to, during, and after the 1965 Selma to Montgomery marches, including the 1965 Voting Rights Act.
- All the Way (2016), focusing on Lyndon B. Johnson's successful attempt to pass the Civil Rights Act of 1964.
- An American Girl Story – Melody 1963: Love Has to Win (2016), depicts the racism faced by a young fictional character in her home town of Detroit during the events leading up to the 16th Street Baptist Church bombing, the film honors the four children killed in the bombing during the end credits.
- My Nephew Emmett (2017), about the 1955 murder of Emmett Till
- Son of the South (2020), focuses on the life of SNCC activist Bob Zellner.
- Till (2022), based on the true story of Mamie Till-Bradley, an educator and activist who pursued justice after the murder of her 14-year-old son Emmett.
- Rustin (2023), film about movement leader Bayard Rustin and the 1963 March on Washington.

== Television ==
- Summer in Mississippi (1965), a Canadian documentary short
- Attack on Terror: The FBI vs. the Ku Klux Klan (1975) two-part television movie dramatizing the events following the 1964 disappearance and murder of three civil rights workers in Mississippi.
- King (1978 miniseries) about Southern Christian Leadership Conference chairman and movement spokesman, Martin Luther King Jr.
- Crisis at Central High (1981), made-for-television movie about the Little Rock Integration Crisis of 1957.
- For Us the Living: The Medgar Evers Story (1983), PBS biopic about assassinated Mississippi civil rights activist Medgar Evers, his work, and his family.
- Eyes on the Prize (1987–1990), a 14-hour documentary series chronicling the civil rights movement.
- My Past Is My Own (1989), a portrayal of students organizing an early 1960s civil rights movement sit-in.
- Murder in Mississippi (1990) movie following the last weeks of three civil rights workers, Michael "Mickey" Schwerner, Andrew Goodman and James Chaney, and the events leading up to their disappearance and subsequent murder during Freedom Summer.
- Separate But Equal (1991), depicts the landmark Supreme Court desegregation case Brown v. Board of Education, based on the phrase "Separate but equal".
- The Ernest Green Story (1993), film chronicling the true story of Ernest Green (Morris Chestnut) and eight other high-school students (dubbed the "Little Rock Nine") and the 1957 integration of Little Rock Central High School in Little Rock, Arkansas.
- George Wallace (1997), a film about George Wallace, the Alabama governor, and his involvement in many of the events of the era including the 1963 "Stand in the Schoolhouse Door".
- Ruby Bridges (1998), the true story of six-year-old Ruby Bridges who, in 1960, became the first black student to integrate an elementary school in the South.
- Any Day Now (1998–2002), series with a major subplot involving the Birmingham campaign.
- Freedom Song (2000), a film based on true stories of the civil rights movement in Mississippi, involving voting rights, Freedom Summer, and the Student Nonviolent Coordinating Committee (SNCC).
- Sins of the Father (2002) chronicles the 1963 16th Street Baptist Church bombing in Birmingham, Alabama, in which four young African American girls were killed while attending Sunday school.
- Alpha Man: The Brotherhood of MLK (2011), BET documentary details Martin Luther King Jr.'s college years and fraternity.
- Freedom Riders (2011), a PBS film marking the 50th anniversary of the first Freedom Ride in May, 1961.
- Betty & Coretta (2013), a film focused on Betty Shabazz and Coretta Scott King.
- Hairspray Live! (2016), a presentation of the John Waters musical about a fictional Baltimore desegregation of a television dance program.
- Rosa (Doctor Who) (2018), an episode of the popular science-fiction series depicts Rosa Parks and her 1955 sit-in which began the Montgomery bus boycott.
- The Umbrella Academy (2020), a time-travel science-fiction series, set its second season in 1963 and depicted organizing meetings and a diner sit-in in the season's third episode.
- Women of the Movement (2022), six-episode series about Mamie Till and her son Emmett.

== Music ==
=== Sung during the civil rights movement ===
- "We Shall Overcome", gospel-based song that became an anthem for the civil rights movement.
- "Kum ba yah" ("Come by here"), an African American spiritual song of disputed origin sung during the movement.
- "We Shall Not Be Moved", spiritual-based song often sung during the civil rights movement.
- "Keep Your Eyes on the Prize", sung during the Movement actions, based on the traditional folk song "Gospel Plow".
- "Oh, Freedom", a post-Civil War African-American freedom song, popular during the Civil Rights Movement.
- "This Little Light of Mine", originally a hymn, the lyrics were modified as it became a movement anthem.
- "Ain't Gonna Let Nobody Turn Me 'Round", movement song adapted from a spiritual.
- "If You Miss Me at the Back of the Bus" by Charles Neblett, a founder and member of The Freedom Singers
- "Woke Up This Morning (With My Mind Stayed On Freedom)", gospel based 1961 revamp by Robert Wesby, composed during the Freedom Rides.

=== About the civil rights movement ===
- "Fables of Faubus" (1957), Charles Mingus's jazz composition written and performed in response to the Little Rock Nine incident
- "The Death of Emmett Till" (1962), one of several songs Bob Dylan paid tribute to civil rights; this one a reference to the Murder of Emmett Till
- "Oxford Town" (1962), written and sung by Bob Dylan, pertains to James Meredith's enrollment at the University of Mississippi.
- "Alabama" (1963), John Coltrane's jazz composition response to a 1963 church bombing that killed four young girls.
- "A Change Is Gonna Come" (1964), written and sung by Sam Cooke, became an anthem for the civil rights movement.
- "Birmingham Sunday" (1964), Richard Fariña's response to the Birmingham church bombing recorded by Joan Baez, Fariña's sister-in-law, on her 1964 album Joan Baez/5.
- "Mississippi Goddamn" (1964), Nina Simone's response to the murder of Medgar Evers.
- "Only a Pawn in Their Game" (1964), Bob Dylan's response to the murder of Medgar Evers, which he sang at the 1963 March on Washington
- "Keep on Pushing" (1964), rhythm and blues hit single by The Impressions.
- "Here's to the State of Mississippi", (1965) a protest song by Phil Ochs that criticizes the state of Mississippi for its mistreatment of African Americans.
- "Eve of Destruction" (1965) references the Selma to Montgomery marches.
- "Abraham, Martin and John" (1968), a tribute to Abraham Lincoln, Martin Luther King Jr, John F. Kennedy, and Robert F. Kennedy written by Dick Holler and first recorded by Dion.
- "Blackbird" (1968), The Beatles song written and performed by Paul McCartney in response to the movement events in the United States. It is directed to black girls in de US and aims to comfort them.
- "If I Can Dream" (1968), recorded by Elvis Presley in honor of King soon after King's death.
- Scenes from the Life of a Martyr (1981), a 16-part oratorio composed by Undine Smith Moore in memory of King.
- "MLK" (1984) by U2, a lullaby to honor Martin Luther King, Jr.
- "Pride (In the Name of Love)" (1984) a song about King by U2
- Joseph Schwantner: New Morning for the World; Nicolas Flagello: The Passion of Martin Luther King (1995), an album of classical music by the Oregon Symphony in honor of King.
- "Up to the Mountain (MLK Song)" (2006), Patty Griffin's song about the emotions surrounding King's 1968 I've Been to the Mountaintop speech.
- "A Dream" (2006), by Common for the film Freedom Writers, uses King's "I Have a Dream" speech
- "Glory" (2014), by Common and John Legend for the film Selma, won both the Golden Globe and Academy Award for Best Original Song.
- "Mother of Muses" (2020) by Bob Dylan refers to the military defeats of the Confederate States of America and Nazism as "(carving) out the path for Martin Luther King".

== Theater ==
- The Meeting (1987), a play about an imaginary 1965 meeting between Martin Luther King Jr. and Malcolm X in a hotel in Harlem.
- James Baldwin: A Soul on Fire (1999), set in Baldwin's apartment on the morning of May 24, 1963, immediately before Baldwin and other Black leaders are scheduled to meet with Attorney General Robert F. Kennedy concerning events in the civil rights movement.
- Hairspray (2002), a musical based on the 1988 film described above.
- The State of Mississippi and the Face of Emmett Till (2003) is a play centered on the murder and subsequent open-casket funeral of Emmett Till.
- The Mountaintop (2009), a play set in Room 306 of the Lorraine Motel the night before King's assassination.
- I Dream (2010), a musical about the life of Martin Luther King Jr.
- All the Way (2012), a play about U.S. president Lyndon B. Johnson and his work to pass the 1964 Civil Rights Act.

== Graphic non-fiction ==
- Martin Luther King and the Montgomery Story (1957), graphic portrayal of the 1955-56 Montgomery bus boycott written by Alfred Hassler and Benton Resnik and illustrated by Sy Barry.
- Darkroom: A Memoir in Black and White (2012) by Lila Quintero Weaver, graphic memoir recounting Weaver's childhood during the 1960s in Marion, Alabama. Published in Spanish as Cuarto oscuro: Recuerdos en blanco y negro.
- March (2013, 2015, 2016), a three-volume graphic autobiography of activist John Lewis recalls his life and the events of the civil rights movement in Nashville, Selma, and other movement sites, co-written by Andrew Aydin and illustrated by Nate Powell.

== Art ==
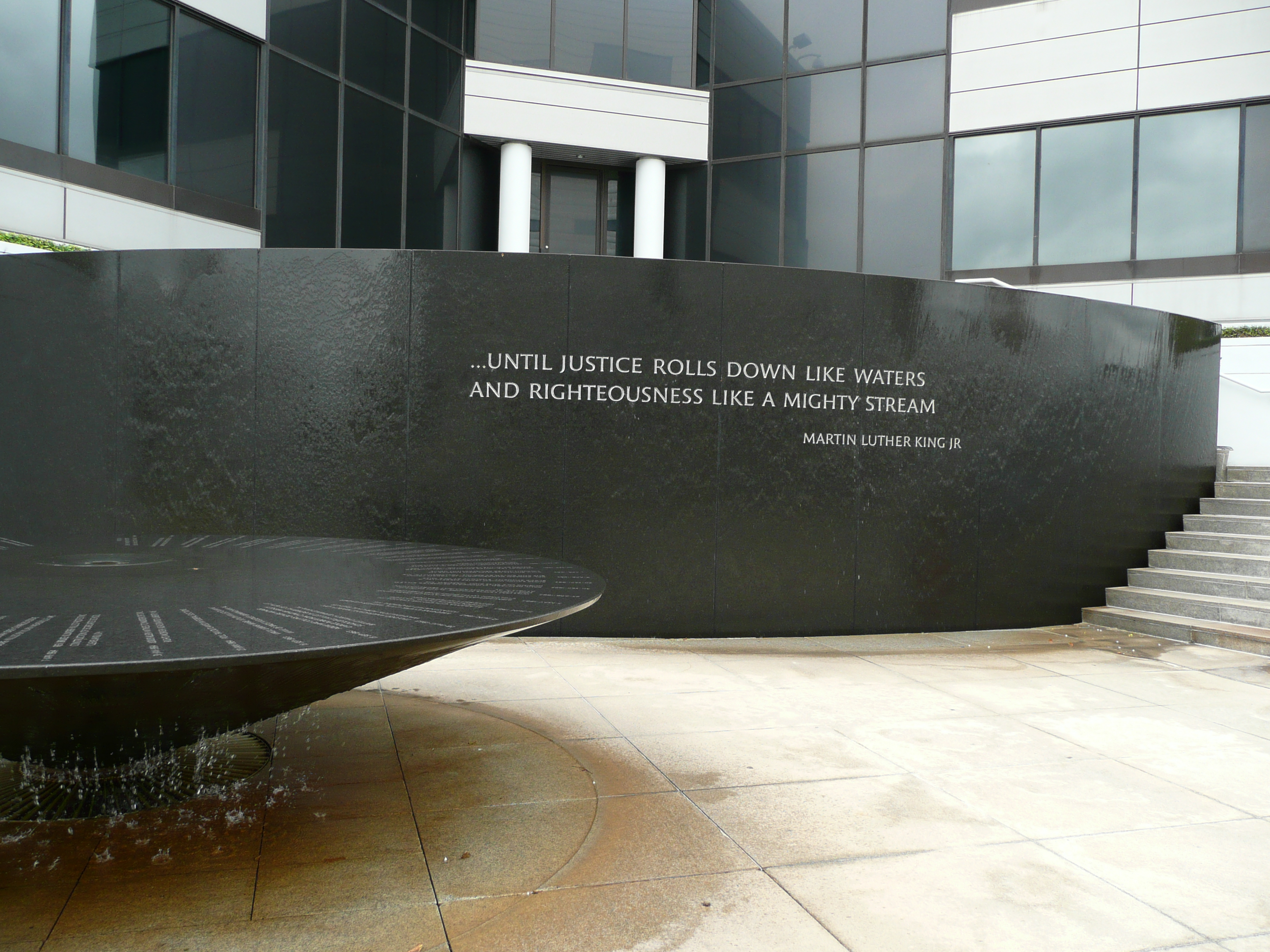
The Civil Rights Memorial, by Maya Lin (1989), Montgomery, Alabama

- The Problem We All Live With (1964), a painting by Norman Rockwell depicting Ruby Bridges, the six-year-old African-American girl who, in 1960, was the first to desegregate William Frantz Elementary School in the South during the New Orleans school desegregation crisis.
- Murder in Mississippi (1965), a painting and an important sketch by Norman Rockwell depicting the 1964 murders of civil rights activists James Chaney, Andrew Goodman and Michael Schwerner.
- Wales Window for Alabama (1965), a stained-glass window by John Petts created in response to the 1963 16th Street Baptist Church bombing.
- Bust of Martin Luther King Jr. (1970), by Charles Alston, has been featured in the Oval Office of the White House by the Obama and Trump presidential administrations.
- Martin Luther King, Jr., Prophet for Peace (1976), a statue of King and Emmett Till in Pueblo, Colorado, by Ed Rose
- U.S. Capitol Rotunda sculpture (1986), a bust of Martin Luther King Jr. by John Woodrow Wilson
- A. Philip Randolph (1988), a statue of A. Philip Randolph by Tina Allen in Boston.
- Civil Rights Memorial (1989), a memorial fountain in Montgomery, Alabama, designed by Maya Lin dedicated to 41 people who died in the civil rights movement.
- Statue of Martin Luther King Jr. (1993), in Mexico City.
- Landmark for Peace Memorial (1994), a statue honoring Martin Luther King, Jr. and Robert F. Kennedy in Indianapolis, Indiana, by Greg Perry and Daniel Edwards.
- Homage to King (1996), statue of Martin Luther King Jr. in Atlanta, Georgia, by Xavier Medina Campeny.
- The Bridge (1997), sculpture in Atlanta, Georgia, by Thornton Dial honoring civil rights movement activist and SNCC leader John Lewis
- Dr. Martin Luther King Jr. (1998), a statue in Milwaukee, Wisconsin, by Eric Blome.
- The Dream (1998), a sculpture honoring Martin Luther King Jr. in Portland, Oregon, by Michael Florin Dente.
- Martin Luther King Jr. (1999), a statue in Austin, Texas, by Jeffrey Varilla and Anna Koh-Varilla.
- Martin Luther King, Jr. Memorial (2000), a bust and accompanying bas reliefs by Jonathan Shahn in Jersey City, New Jersey.
- February One (2002), a statue by James Barnhill in Greensboro, North Carolina, commemorating the four students who organized the 1960 Greensboro sit-ins.
- Statue of Martin Luther King Jr. (2002), in Denver Colorado, by Ed Dwight, also features depictions of activists Frederick Douglass, Mohandas Gandhi, Rosa Parks, and Sojourner Truth.
- Statue of James Meredith (2006), a statue at the University of Mississippi in Oxford which honors James Meredith, who desegregated the university in 1962.
- Statue of Martin Luther King Jr. (2007) in Houston, Texas, by Ed Dwight.
- The Virginia Civil Rights Memorial (2008), designed and sculpted by Stanley Bleifeld, consists of 18 statues representing individuals, including student Barbara Johns, who protested to bring school desegregation to the state.
- Statue of Rosa Parks (2009), a statue in Eugene, Oregon, portrays activist Rosa Parks waiting for a bus.
- Martin Luther King, Jr. Memorial (2011), showcases the Stone of Hope, a statue of Martin Luther King Jr. by Lei Yixin, and several surrounding art pieces and quotations on the National Mall in Washington, D.C.
- St. Augustine Foot Soldiers Monument (2011), by Brian R. Owens, commemorates the activists who participated in the 1963-64 St. Augustine movement.
- Emmett Till: How She Sent Him and How She Got Him Back (2012), a painting by Lisa Whittington depicting the results of the 1955 lynching of Emmett Till
- Rosa Parks (2013), statue in National Statuary Hall, Capitol Building, Washington, D.C.
- Statues of Martin Luther King Jr. (2015, 2021), two statues of Dr. King by Thomas Jay Warren in Newark, New Jersey
- Open Casket (2016), a painting by Dana Schutz depicting Emmett Till after his 1955 lynching.
- Martin Luther King Jr. statue (2017), designed by Martin Dawe from a photograph from the Montgomery bus boycott, Atlanta, Georgia
- Continuing the Conversation (2018), a double-statue of Rosa Parks by Martin Dawe, Georgia Tech, Atlanta, Georgia
- Hope Moving Forward (2021), a statue of Martin Luther King Jr. in Atlanta, Georgis, designed by Basil Watson
- Statue of John Lewis (2021), statue of movement leader John Lewis by Gregory Johnson, Atlanta
- The Embrace (2023), statue of Martin and Coretta King hugging, by Hank Willis Thomas, Boston
- Statue of Daisy Bates (2024) by Benjamin Victor, installed in the U.S. Capitol National Statuary Hall Collection in honor of activist Daisy Batesz
- John Lewis Memorial (2024) by Basil Watson, installed in Decatur, Georgia
- Steadfast Stride Toward Justice (2024) by Basil Watson, installed in Montgomery, Alabama, in honor of John Lewis
- Statue of Barbara Rose Johns (2025) by Steven Weitzman was installed in the U.S. Capitol National Statuary Hall Collection in honor of Virginia activist Barbara Rose Johns

== Holidays ==
- Martin Luther King Jr. Day, a U.S. federal holiday

== See also ==
- List of photographers of the civil rights movement
- Freedom Songs
- Civil Rights Movement Archive
- A Force More Powerful, 1999 documentary and 2000 television series
- Birmingham Civil Rights National Monument
- Medgar and Myrlie Evers Home National Monument
- Freedom Riders National Monument
- Little Rock Central High School Desegregation silver dollar
- National Civil Rights Museum
- National Voting Rights Museum
- Memorials to Martin Luther King Jr.
- Streets named after Martin Luther King Jr.
- Television News of the Civil Rights Era 1950–1970
- Emmett Till and Mamie Till-Mobley National Monument
- USNS Medgar Evers
- USNS John Lewis
