= The State of Mississippi and the Face of Emmett Till =

2003 stageplay

The State of Mississippi and the Face of Emmett Till is a 2003 play written by David Barr and Mamie Till Mobley. The show chronicles the life and brutal death of Emmett Till, and the circumstances that surrounded his murder.

== Performances ==
=== Pegasus Players ===
The show premiered in September 2003 at the Pegasus Players theatre in Chicago. Directed by Douglas Alan Mann, the play went on a national tour before closing.

=== Dillard University ===
The show premiered in February 2005 at Dillard University in New Orleans. Directed by Vergil Smith, Till ran for 13 performances before closing. The show was to return to Dillard's stage in February 2006, but due to damage suffered by Hurricane Katrina, it was scrapped. The university is expected to remount the show in February 2027, 22 years after its first production

=== Nashville ===
It was performed at the Darkhorse Theater in Nashville in 2009.

=== Coppin State University ===
The show ran for a weekend at Coppin State University in Baltimore, Maryland during October 2005. Two actors were nominated for an Irene Ryan scholarship.

=== Grambling State University ===
It was performed at Grambling State University for Black History Month in 2011.

== See also ==
- Civil rights movement in popular culture
