= A Parade of Animals =

Sculpture in Salem, Oregon, U.S.

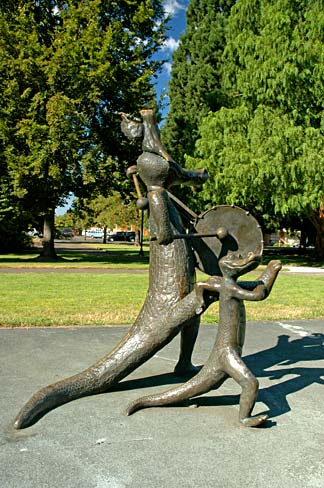
- Part of the art installation in 2006
- Artist: Peter Helzer
- Year: 1991
- Medium: Bronze sculpture
- Condition: "Well maintained" (1993)
- Location: Salem, Oregon, United States
- 44°56′20.9″N 123°1′58.9″W

A Parade of Animals, or Parade of Animals, is an outdoor bronze sculpture series by Peter Helzer, installed in Willson Park, on the Oregon State Capitol grounds, in Salem, Oregon, United States.

== Description ==
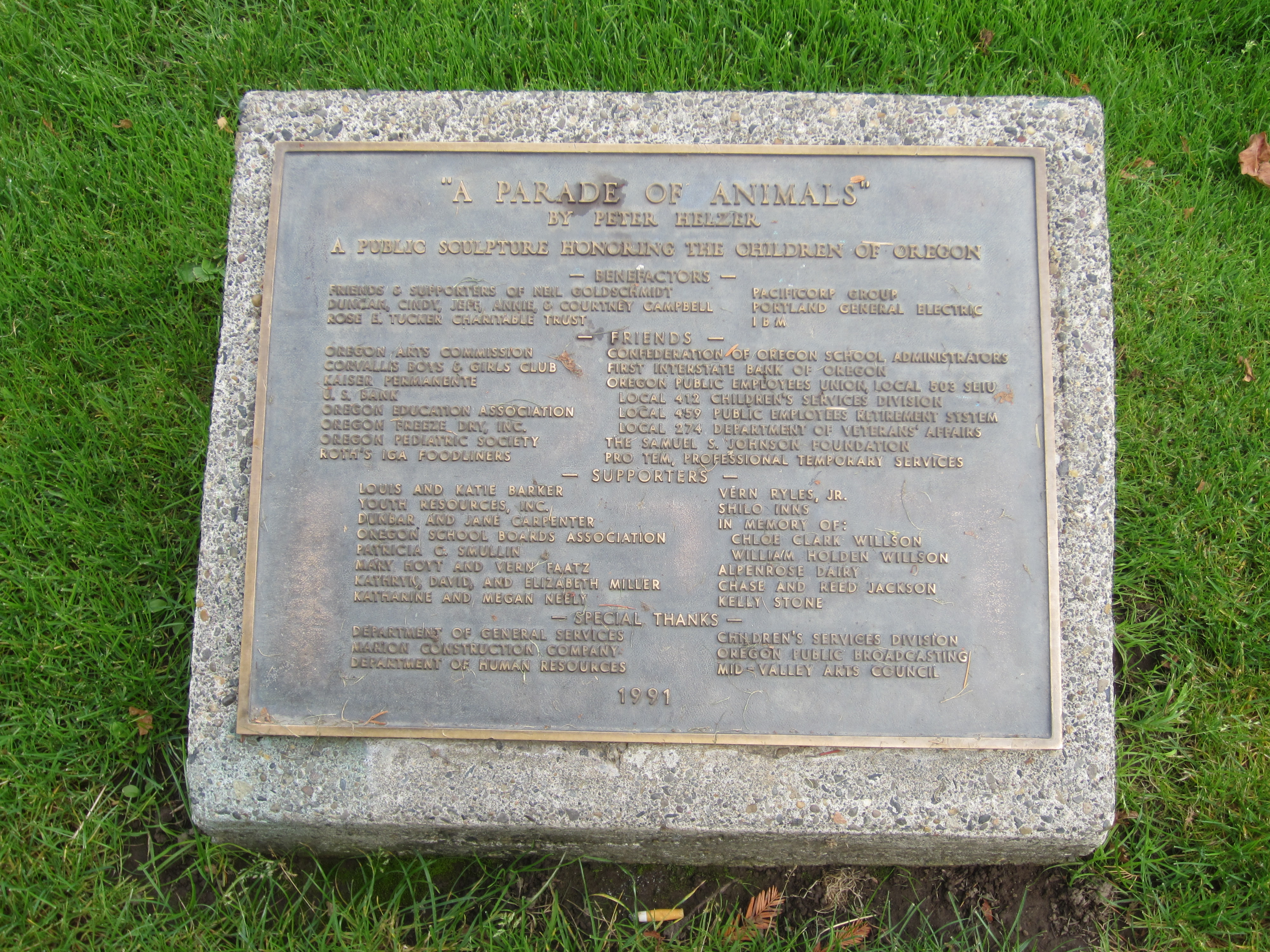
Plaque for the sculpture

The installation features three groups of animals playing musical instruments. One depicts two stacked frogs; the one on bottom is walking on stilts and the one on top is playing the concertina. Another shows two crocodiles, one of which is playing a drum and horn. The third sculpture depicts three rodents, one of which is carrying a horn.

== History ==
The sculptures were dedicated in 1991 and commemorate the children of Oregon. Their condition were deemed "well maintained" during the Smithsonian Institution's "Save Outdoor Sculpture!" survey in July 1993. Parade of Animals was administered by Oregon's Department of Administrative Services at the time.

== See also ==
- 1991 in art
- Statue of Rosa Parks (Eugene, Oregon)
- The Storyteller (sculpture), Eugene
