= Gustave Blache III =

American painter

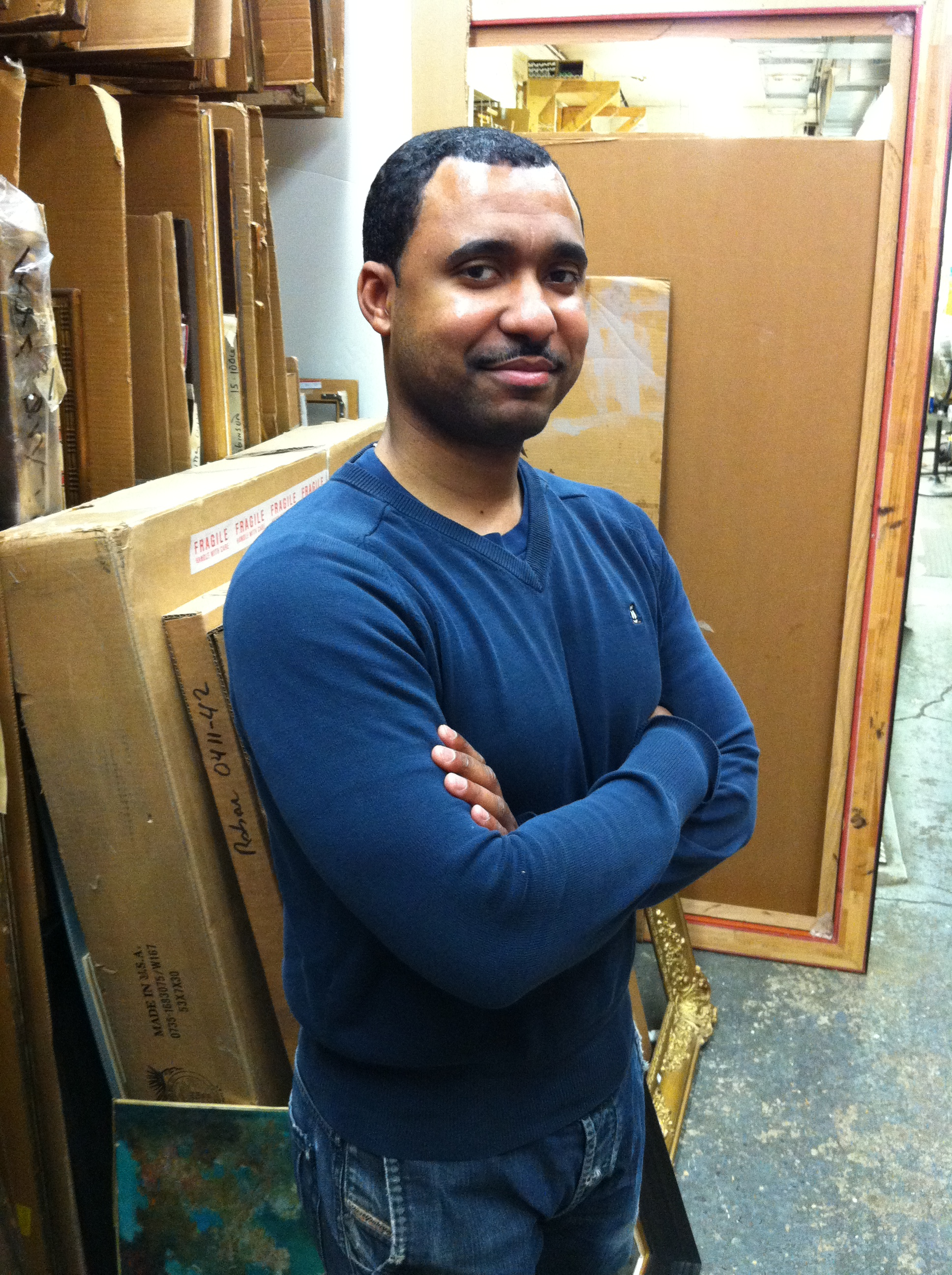
- Born: 1977 (age 48–49); San Bernardino, California, U.S.
- Notable work: Series Works include: Leah Chase Series (2010), Self-Portraits (2000-2008) Mop Makers Series (2006), Curtain Cleaner Series (2003), Still Life (2002-2003), Portraits (2000-2001)
- Website: gustaveblache.com

Gustave Blache III (/ˈɡʌstɑːv ˈblɑːʃ/ GUS-tahv BLAHSH; born 1977) is an American figurative artist from New Orleans, Louisiana, currently residing in Brooklyn, New York. He is best known for his works in series that highlight the process and unique labors of everyday society.

== Early life and education ==
Gustave Blache III was born in San Bernardino, California in 1977. In 1983 he moved to New Orleans, Louisiana. While in elementary school, Blache was invited to study twice a week at the New Orleans Museum of Art (NOMA). Drawing pictures of plaster casts and painting copies of Old Masters provided an early understanding of the Old Masters who influence his work today.

Blache attended the New Orleans Center for Creative Arts (N.O.C.C.A.), a selective visual and performing arts high school with notable alumni such as jazz musicians Branford, Wynton and Jason Marsalis and actor Wendell Pierce. From 1994 to 1998, he attended the School of Visual Arts in Savannah, Georgia, a satellite campus of New York's School of Visual Arts. Upon receiving his Bachelor of Fine Arts from the School of Visual Arts (Savannah), Blache moved to New York to attend the School of Visual Arts main campus, where he earned an MFA in May 2000.

== Career ==
In Savannah, Blache gained recognition for his life-size figurative paintings. This led to him receiving several commissions, reviews, and a book cover. Savannah author Aberjhani featured Blache's painting, The Art Spirit, as the original cover for his book, I Made My Boy Out of Poetry. The Art Spirit paid homage to one of Blache's influences, artist Robert Henri. The painting contains the book written by Robert Henri entitled The Art Spirit in the bottom right corner which is left untethered by a belt that is used to tie other books beneath into a bundle.

In 2007, Blache appeared in the documentary film Colored Frames that recounts the influences, inspirations and experiences of African-American artists in the art world over the past 50 years. Colored Frames also featured artists Benny Andrews and Ed Clark along with influential artdealers and scholars June Kelly, Danny Simmons and Mary Schmidt Campbell. Blache's painting "Between the Head and the Hand" was selected for the DVD cover.

Blache's solo exhibition at Cole Pratt Gallery in 2008 entitled, In Shadow, featured ten self-portraits which isolated shadowed sections of his face in an effort to articulate the range of color that the shadow possesses. The George and Leah McKenna Museum in New Orleans, Louisiana acquired two self-portraits from this exhibition, Self-Portrait in Shadow and Self-Portrait Standing at Easel.

In 2013 the Smithsonian National Museum of African American History and Culture acquired Self Portrait with Checkered Scarf. “The painting is part of a series created by Blache to study the effects of color, light, and shadow on the human face,” says NMAAHC Curator, Tuliza Fleming. “The acquisition of Blache’s self-portrait helps fulfill our goal of owning and exhibition a stylistically, regionally, and culturally diverse array of contemporary art by African-American artists.” After featuring the young artists in group exhibitions alongside Edgar Degas, Mary Cassatt, James McNeil Whistler and other heralded 19th Century artists, Island Weiss Gallery in New York hosted the 24 year olds first solo exhibition. That same summer Woodward Gallery's Paper 5 exhibition displayed Blache's work alongside paintings by Robert Rauschenberg, Andy Warhol, Jasper Johns, Jean Michel Basquiat, and other notable Post-War artists.

=== Visual journalism ===
Blache is largely credited for combining traditional painting methods of portraiture with journalism in a brand of art which he affectionately terms, Visual Journalism. His documentary style format uses a series of paintings, dedicated to one subject, to tell the story of an overlooked individual or process. Labor is usually at the center of Blache's series’. His method of work was on display in his 2017 exhibition, A Work in Process, at the Louisiana Arts and Science Museum in Baton Rouge, Louisiana. Curator Elizabeth Weinstein assembled over 60 of Blache's paintings from public and private collections across the country to showcase all of Blache's depiction of laborers. Those series’ included The Curtain Cleaners, The Mop Makers, Leah Chase: Paintings by Gustave Blache III, and Simon Parkes Art Conservation (SPAC).

In 2013 the Smithsonian National Museum of African American History and Culture acquired Self Portrait with Checkered Scarf. “The painting is part of a series created by Blache to study the effects of color, light, and shadow on the human face,” says NMAAHC Curator, Tuliza Fleming. “The acquisition of Blache’s self-portrait helps fulfill our goal of owning and exhibition a stylistically, regionally, and culturally diverse array of contemporary art by African-American artists.”[3]

=== The Gustave Blache Art Scholarship ===
In 2018 Gustave established the Gustave Blache Art Scholarship with The School of Visual Arts and the Louisiana Endowment for the Humanities. The scholarship covers half the tuition for two students from Louisiana chosen to attend the School of Visual Arts in New York City. The scholarship is an extension of a Blache's commitment to community and education.

=== Leah Chase ===
From April 24, 2012, to September 16, 2012, the New Orleans Museum of Art exhibited Blache's most notable series up to date, Leah Chase: Paintings by Gustave Blache III. The exhibition documented national culinary star chef Leah Chase in the kitchen and the dining room in one of New Orleans’ most famous restaurants, Dooky Chase Restaurant.

Blache was introduced to the idea of painting Leah Chase by his art representative at the time Eugene C. Daymude in the summer of 2009. The 20 small oil paintings that comprised the series detailed the day-to-day activities 92-year-old Chef Leah Chase encounters from early morning prep work to greeting guests in the dining room. Blache was heralded for his depiction of the culinary icon for his accuracy and delicate handling of paint, color, and texture. “Asked whether she thought the rendering was accurate, Chase, 89, said the young artist had gotten it right. “I told him, ‘You could have made me look like Halle Berry or Lena Horne, but you made it look like me,’” she said. The painting Cutting Squash was acquired for its permanent collection by the Smithsonian National Portrait Gallery in 2011. “We are always looking for portraits of nationally prominent figures,” National Portrait Gallery chief curator Brandon Fortune said. “It is a very interesting image of a woman at work, doing a very simple task, cutting squash,” . . . “But in some ways it transcends the everyday and becomes something of national significance.” This series reinforces Blache's commitment to documenting everyday labor and showcasing these intimate processes to the public. Another one of the Smithsonian Institution Museums, National Museum of African History and Culture, came calling for another painting of Chase from the Blache series in 2013 and acquired Leah Red Coat Stirring (Sketch) in 2013, making it the third painting from Blache to be included in the permanent collection of the Smithsonian Institution.

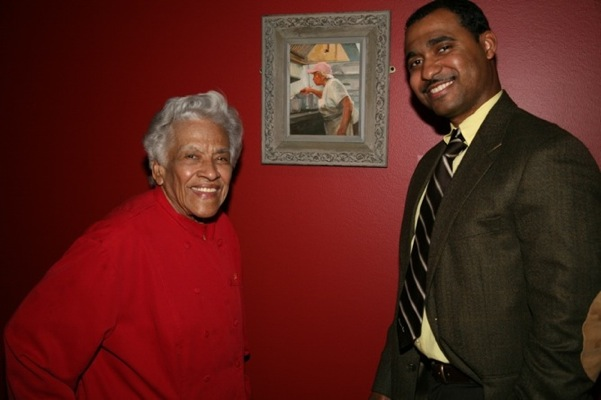
Chef Leah Chase (left) and Artist Gustave Blache III (right) standing in front of the painting Stirring Pot (Close Up) from the New Orleans Museum of Art exhibition Leah Chase: Paintings by Gustave Blache III.

=== Leah Chase: Exhibition Catalogue ===
The catalogue for the exhibition Leah Chase: Paintings by Gustave Blache III was published by Hudson Hills Press in the Fall of 2012. The foreword to the catalogue was written by Miranda Lash, PhD, Curator of Modern and Contemporary Art of the New Orleans Museum of Art. In her comments, Lash likens Blache's work to the American realists of the early twentieth century, stating, “Although Blache in the past has been called a "contemporary impressionist," it might be more accurate to compare his work to that of these American realist painters from the early twentieth century. Henri and Sloan's interest in depicting the labor and beauty of modern life..."

The introduction to the catalogue was provided by Michael Quick, PhD. Quick writes, "Blache's figure painting definitely is painting. I say that because of the freedom of his skillful brushwork, best seen in figures."

In addition to cataloging the complete Leah Chase series of paintings, the catalogue also includes several essays, written by A.P. Tureaud Jr., E. John Bullard, Director Emeritus of the New Orleans Museum of Art, and Richard Anthony Lewis, PhD, Curator of Visual Arts, Louisiana State Museum. These essays offer critical discussion of the Leah Chase Paintings.

In his essay, Richard Anthon Lewis, PhD writes, "The combination of Blache's artistic style with an established and honored subject in Leah Chase is a contemporary extension of both classical French and American Realism." Lewis's statement on style mirror the comments made by Miranda Lash, classifying Blache's work in the American Realist style while also concurring with earlier critics regarding the similarities between Blache's style and that of the Classical French. John Bullard drew stylistic connections between Blache and French artist Édouard Vuillard, stating “His [Blache’s] paintings, done in small, intimate size and reminiscent of the French artist Edouard Vuillard, are highly detailed and richly colored."

== Exhibitions ==
=== Solo exhibitions ===
- 2017 A Work in Process, Survey Exhibition, Louisiana Arts and Science Museum, Baton Rouge, LA
- 2012 Leah Chase: Paintings by Gustave Blache III, One-man exhibition, New Orleans Museum of Art, New Orleans, LA
- 2010 Dooky Chase Restaurant, Preview Exhibition, Le Musée de f.p.c., New Orleans, LA
- 2008 In Shadow, Self Portraits, Cole Pratt Gallery, New Orleans, LA
- 2006 The Mop Makers, Cole Pratt Gallery, New Orleans, LA
- 2004 Still Lifes, Cole Pratt Gallery, New Orleans, LA
- 2003 The Curtain Cleaners, Cole Pratt Gallery, New Orleans, LA
- 2001 Recent Works, Island Weiss Gallery, New York, NY
- 2000 Recent Works, Kim Iocovozzi Fine Art, Savannah, GA

=== Group exhibitions ===
- 2019 Eye Contact, Pennsylvania Academy of Fine Art, Philadelphia, PA
- 2019 Still I Rise, Mass MoCA, North Adams, Massachusetts
- 2018 Portraits of Who We Are, The David C. Driskell Museum Center at the University of Maryland
- 2017 The Sweat of Their Face Portraying American Workers, National Portrait Gallery, Smithsonian Washington D.C.
- 2016 Grand Opening, National Museum of African American History and Culture, Smithsonian Washington D.C.
- 2014 New Acquisitions, National Portrait Gallery, Smithsonian Washington D.C.
- 2005 Art 20, Park Avenue Armory, New York, NY[14]
- 2004 13th Annual American Fine Art Show, 33rd Street Armory, Philadelphia, PA
- 2004 Online Exhibition, Franklin Riehlman Fine Art, New York, NY
- 2004 The Art of Summer Living!, Island Weiss Gallery, New York, NY
- 2004 Selected Works, New Orleans African American Museum, New Orleans, LA
- 2004 Intimate Viewing of a Selection of 19th and 20th Century, European, and Contemporary Art, Island Weiss Gallery, New York, NY
- 2003 Recent Works, Perry Nicole Fine Art, Memphis, TN
- 2002 Selected Works, Free Biennial Show, New York, NY
- 2002 Paper Invitational 5, Woodward Gallery, New York, NY
- 2002 Small Works, Perry Nicole Fine Art, Memphis, TN
- 2002 Selected Works, Cole Pratt Gallery, New Orleans, LA
- 2001 Selected Works, Island Weiss Gallery, New York, NY
- 2001 Selected Works, Arts Forum Gallery, New York, NY
- 2000 Selected Works, Society of Illustrators, New York, NY
- 2000 MFA Thesis Exhibition, Tribeca Art Club, New York, NY
- 2000 Alumni Exhibition, School of Visual Arts, New York, NY
