= Leah Chase =

American chef and artist (1923–2019)

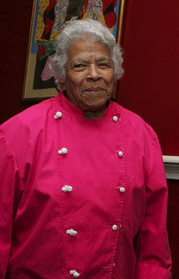
- Leah Chase in April 2008
- Born: Leyah Lange; January 6, 1923; Madisonville, Louisiana, U.S.
- Died: June 1, 2019 (aged 96); New Orleans, Louisiana, U.S.
- Spouse: Edgar "Dooky" Chase II (m. 1946; died 2016)
- Children: 4
- Culinary career
- Cooking style: Creole
- Current restaurant
- Dooky Chase
- Awardss
- 2010 James Beard Foundation's Who's Who of Food & Beverage in America; 2009 Louisiana Restaurant Association's Restaurateur of the Year; 2000 Lifetime achievement award from the Southern Foodways Alliance; 1997 Times-Picayune Loving Cup Award

Leyah (Leah) Chase (née Lange; January 6, 1923 – June 1, 2019) was an American chef based in New Orleans, Louisiana. An author and television personality, she was known as the Queen of Creole Cuisine, advocating both African-American art and Creole cooking. Her restaurant, Dooky Chase, was known as a gathering place during the 1960s among many who participated in the Civil Rights Movement, and was known as a gallery due to its extensive African-American art collection. In 2018, it was named one of the 40 most important restaurants of the past 40 years by Food & Wine.

Chase was the recipient of a multitude of awards and honors. In her 2002 biography, Chase's awards and honors occupy over two pages. Chase was inducted into the James Beard Foundation's Who's Who of Food & Beverage in America in 2010. She was honored with a lifetime achievement award from the Southern Foodways Alliance in 2000. Chase received honorary degrees from Tulane University, Dillard University, Our Lady of Holy Cross College, Madonna College, Loyola University New Orleans, and Johnson & Wales University. She was awarded Times-Picayune Loving Cup Award in 1997. The Southern Food and Beverage Museum in New Orleans, Louisiana, named a permanent gallery in Chase's honor in 2009.

== Early life ==
Leah Chase was born to Catholic Creole parents, on January 6, 1923, in Madisonville, Louisiana. Her ancestry included African, French, and Spanish. Chase's father was a caulker at the Jahncke Shipyard and her grandmother was a registered nurse and midwife. Chase was the second oldest of 13 children, according to The New York Times; other sources report that she had 10 or 13 siblings. She was six when the Great Depression struck and later recollected surviving on produce the family grew themselves—okra, peas, greens—and clothes made of sacks that had held rice and flour. The children helped cultivate the land, especially on the 20-acre strawberry farm her father's family owned, which Chase described as forming an integral part of her knowledge of food:

I always say it's good coming up in a small, rural town because you learn about animals. Kids today don't know the food they eat. If you come up in a country town, where there's some farming, some cattle raising, some chicken raising, you know about those things ... When we went to pick strawberries we had to walk maybe four or five miles through the woods and you learned what you could eat. You knew you could eat that mayhaw, you could eat muscadines. You knew that, growing up in the woods. You just knew things. You got to appreciate things.

Madisonville, a segregated town, did not have a Catholic high school for black children, so Chase moved to New Orleans to live with relatives and pursue a Catholic education at St. Mary's Academy.

Chase's roots were heavily centered in Louisiana, with only one great-grandparent born elsewhere. Her ancestry was multiethnic inclusive of African American, Spanish, and French. Her ancestors include one of the first African Americans to serve in the Louisiana state House of Representatives (1868–1870).

== Early career ==
After high school, Leah held other jobs, including marking racehorse boards for a bookie in New Orleans, in which she was the first woman to do so and an overseer of two nonprofessional boxers. Chase's favorite job was working as a waitress at the Colonial Restaurant and The Coffee Pot (which has been renamed "Cafe Beignet at the Old Coffee Pot") in the French Quarter in New Orleans with a pay of "$1 a day".

== Dooky Chase's restaurant ==
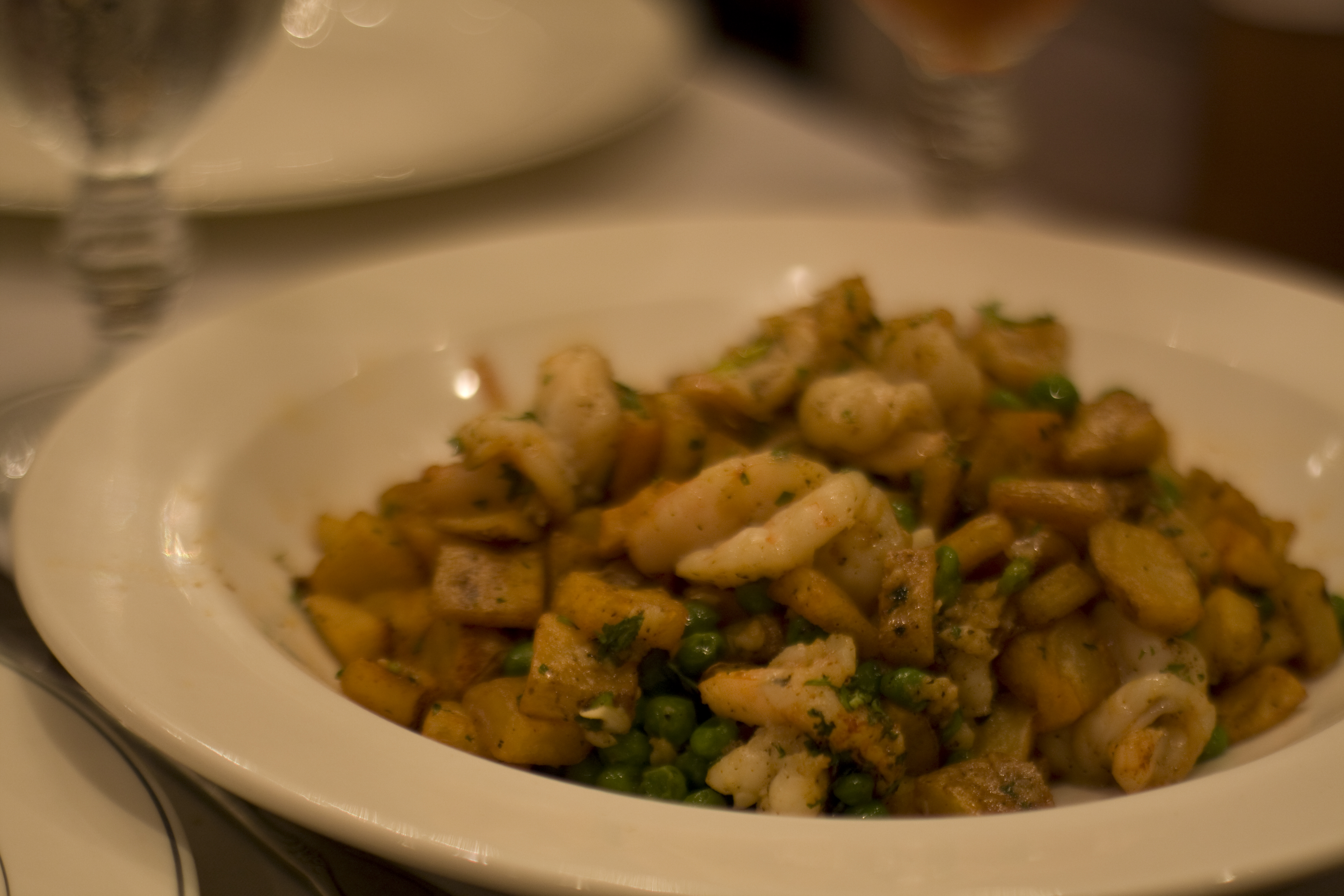
Shrimp Clemenceau

In 1946, she married jazz trumpeter and band leader Edgar "Dooky" Chase II. His parents owned a street corner stand in Tremé, founded in 1941, that sold lottery tickets and homemade po-boy sandwiches. Chase began working in the kitchen at the restaurant during the 1950s, and over time, Leah and Dooky took over the stand and converted it into a sit-down establishment, Dooky Chase's Restaurant. She eventually updated the menu to reflect her own family's Creole recipes as well as recipes—such as Shrimp Clemenceau—otherwise available only in whites-only establishments from which she and her patrons were barred. In 2018, Food & Wine named the restaurant one of the 40 most important restaurants of the past 40 years.

=== Civil rights movement ===
Dooky Chase became a staple in the black communities of New Orleans, and by the 1960s, became one of the only public places in New Orleans where African Americans could meet and discuss strategies during the civil rights movement. Leah and her husband Edgar would host black voter registration campaign organizers, the NAACP, black political meetings and many other civil leaders at their restaurant, including local civil rights leaders A. P. Tureaud and Ernest "Dutch" Morial, and later Martin Luther King Jr. and the Freedom Riders.

They would hold secret meetings and private strategy discussions in her upstairs meeting rooms while she served them gumbo and fried chicken. Dooky Chase had become so popular that even though local officials knew about these "illegal" meetings, the city or local law enforcement could not stop them or shut the doors because of the risk of public backlash.

Dooky Chase's Restaurant was key when King and the Freedom Riders came to learn from the Baton Rouge Bus Boycott. As King and the Freedom Riders were beginning to organize their bus boycott in Montgomery, they would hold meetings with civil leaders from New Orleans and Baton Rouge in Dooky Chase's meeting rooms to learn about the bus boycotts in Baton Rouge. The plan and organization of the Montgomery bus boycotts were inspired by the boycotts in Baton Rouge.

While there were no black-owned banks in African-American communities, people would commonly go to Dooky Chase on Fridays, where Leah Chase and her husband would cash checks for trusted patrons at the bar. Friday nights became popular, as people would cash their checks, have a drink, and order a po-boy.

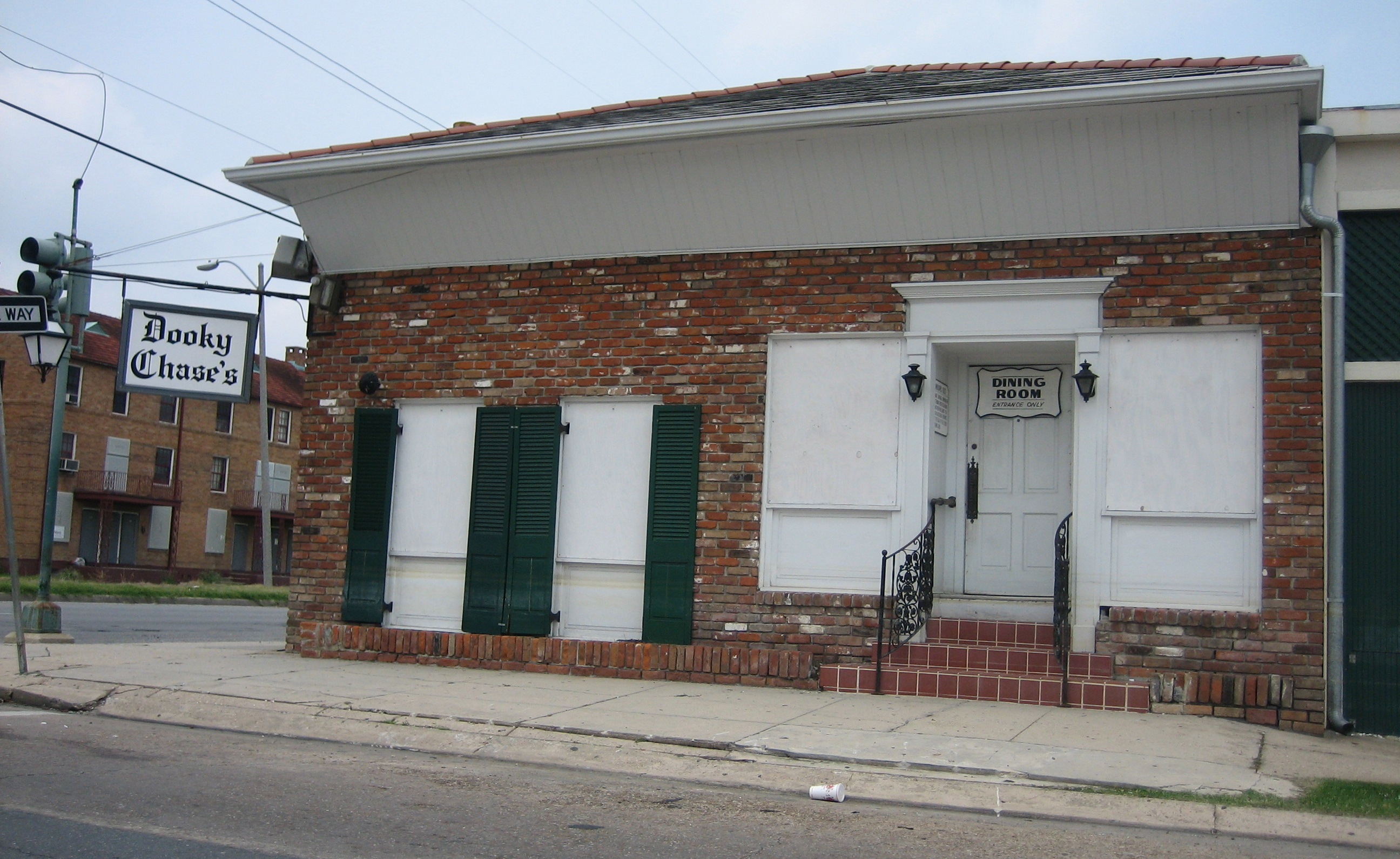
Dooky Chase's Restaurant with flood lines still visible, May 2006.

=== Art collection ===
Chase studied art in high school, but because museums were segregated in the Jim Crow South, she was 54 the first time she visited an art museum, with Celestine Cook. Cook was the first African-American to sit on the board of the New Orleans Museum of Art, which Chase also joined in 1972. Chase began catering gallery openings for early-career artists during the Civil Rights period, and started collecting African-American art after her husband gave her a Jacob Lawrence painting. She soon began to display dozens of paintings and sculptures by African-American artists like Elizabeth Catlett and John T. Biggers, as well as hire local musicians to play in her bar. In addition to serving on the board of the New Orleans Museum of Art, she was on the boards of the Arts Council of New Orleans, the Louisiana Children's Museum, the Urban League of Greater New Orleans, and the Greater New Orleans Foundation.

=== Hurricane Katrina ===
Dooky Chase's 6th Ward of New Orleans location was flooded by Hurricane Katrina, and Chase and her husband spent more than a year living in a FEMA trailer across the street from the restaurant. To save Chase's African-American art collection from damage, her grandson placed the art collection in storage. The New Orleans restaurant community got together on April 14, 2006 (Holy Thursday) to hold a benefit, charging $75 to $500 per person for a gumbo z'herbes, fried chicken, and bread pudding lunch at a posh French Quarter restaurant. The guests consumed 50 gallons of gumbo and raised $40,000 for the 82-year-old Mrs. Chase. While she worked to reopen the restaurant, Chase also joined Women of the Storm, a coalition of women from neighborhoods across the city who joined together to lobby Congress for funds to restore New Orleans and other communities after Hurricanes Katrina and Rita. Chase was one of the women associated with the group that flew to Washington, D.C., to speak to Congress and the White House.

=== Reopening and accolades ===
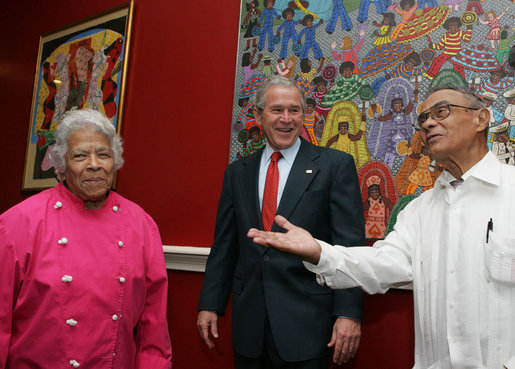
Chase with George W. Bush, 2008

After reopening the doors of Dooky Chase's, Leah Chase fed her creole cuisine to many important figures, including U.S. Presidents George W. Bush and Barack Obama. Known as the Queen of Creole Cuisine, Leah Chase won many awards and achievements in her lifetime. She was awarded "Best Fried Chicken in New Orleans" by NOLA.com in 2014. She received the James Beard Lifetime Achievement award in 2016 for her lifetime's body of work, which had a positive and lasting impact on the way people ate, cooked, and thought about food in New Orleans. Many world renowned chefs, such as John Besh and Emeril Lagasse, honored Leah Chase and credited her with perfecting creole cuisine. Chase fed many celebrities, politicians and activists, such as Hank Aaron, Bill Cosby, Lena Horne, James Baldwin, and many other prominent figures in the African-American community. In "Early in the Morning," Ray Charles sang, “I went to Dooky Chase to get me something to eat.”

Dooky Chase's operated under limited hours in the years after Hurricane Katrina. Chase envisioned her restaurant as a modern version of what it once was. In a time where she would sell sandwiches and snacks from a walk-up window, the bar would be a social hub in the community again, and her restaurant would be open for lunch and dinner with an extended menu so more people could enjoy her food. According to the family of Chase, the hours of operation and limited menu were intended to save Leah Chase from "her own work ethic." Chase continued to work in the kitchen of Dooky Chase and for events honoring her, until she entered the hospital a few days before April 18th, 2019. During the last few years of her life, chef John Folse had begun to make the traditional gumbo z'herbes for the annual Holy Thursday lunch, under Chase's supervision.

== Death and legacy ==
Chase died on June 1, 2019, at the age of 96. A devout Catholic, she was funeralized at St. Peter Claver Church in New Orleans.

=== In the media ===
In 2007, Chase appeared on Fetch! with Ruff Ruffman, where she assisted the contestants on cooking gumbo for a competition. In the 2012 revival of Tennessee Williams's classic New Orleans play A Streetcar Named Desire, which had an all-African-American cast, a mention of the restaurant Galatoire's (which was segregated during the play's post-war 1940s time period) was changed to a mention of Dooky Chase's Restaurant, which was integrated. Leah Chase was also the inspiration for the main character Tiana in the 2009 Disney animated film The Princess and the Frog. In a 2017 episode of the Travel Channel's Man v. Food, host Casey Webb visited Dooky Chase to try their famed Creole gumbo. Miss Leah made a cameo appearance as herself in a Season 2 episode of NCIS: New Orleans.

=== Chase Family Foundation ===
In 2013, Chase and her husband Edgar "Dooky" Chase Jr. founded the Edgar "Dooky" Jr. and Leah Chase Family Foundation. According to their official website, The Edgar "Dooky" Jr. and Leah Chase Family Foundation was founded to "cultivate and support historically disenfranchised organizations by making significant contributions to education, creative and culinary arts, and social justice." Having spent her life advocating for civil rights, supporting local artist and musicians, and providing original creole cuisine this foundation was an extension of her passion. Through this foundation, the Chase family hosted several fundraising events to support children's educations such as music, art and history. Their foundation has been sponsored by many local businesses and organizations, such as Liberty Bank, Metro Disposal, Popeyes, Entergy New Orleans and many others.

== Cookbooks ==
- The Dooky Chase Cookbook (1990) ISBN 0-88289-661-X
- And Still I Cook (2003) ISBN 1-56554-823-X
- Down Home Healthy : Family Recipes of Black American Chefs (1994) ISBN 0-16-045166-3

== Art ==
From April 24, 2012, to September 16, 2012, the New Orleans Museum of Art exhibited Leah Chase: Paintings by Gustave Blache III. The exhibition documented chef Leah Chase in the kitchen and the dining room at Dooky Chase's Restaurant. Asked whether she thought the rendering was accurate, Chase, 89, said the young artist had gotten it right. "I told him, 'You could have made me look like Halle Berry or Lena Horne, but you made it look like me,'" she said.

== In the Smithsonian ==
=== Clothing ===
A red chef's coat that was owned and used by Chase is at the National Museum of African American History and Culture.

=== Paintings ===
Blache's painting, Cutting Squash, from the exhibition at the New Orleans Museum of Art was acquired for its permanent collection by the Smithsonian National Portrait Gallery in 2011. "We are always looking for portraits of nationally prominent figures," said Brandon Fortune (chief curator). "It is a very interesting image of a woman at work, doing a very simple task, cutting squash ... But in some ways it transcends the everyday and becomes something of national significance." Chase has two paintings owned by The National Museum of African American History and Culture branch of the Smithsonian from the Blache series, including Leah Red Coat Stirring (Sketch).

=== Exhibition catalogue ===
The catalogue for the exhibition Leah Chase: Paintings by Gustave Blache III was published by Hudson Hills Press in the Fall of 2012.

== See also ==
- Creole cuisine
- Cajun cuisine
