= Dooky Chase's Restaurant =

New Orleans Restaurant

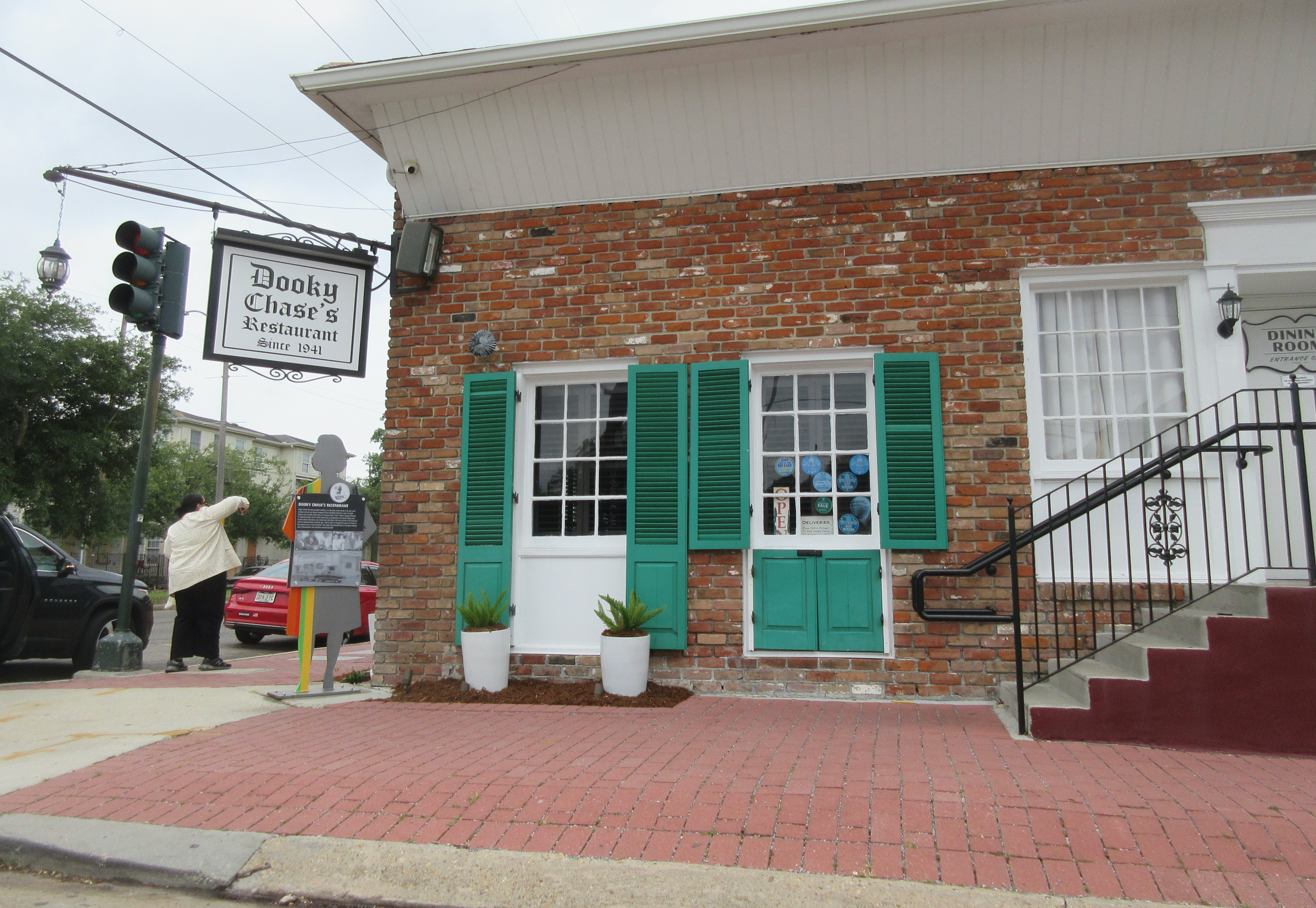
- The front entrance, 2026
- Interactive map of Dooky Chase's Restaurant

Restaurant information
- Location: New Orleans, United States
- Coordinates: 29.96821°N 90.07850°W
- Website: www.dookychaserestaurants.com

Dooky Chase's Restaurant is a restaurant in Tremé neighborhood of New Orleans that in the 1950s and 1960s was known as a place for civil rights leaders to safely "meet and strategize."

In 2018, Food & Wine named it one of the 40 most important restaurants of the past 40 years. In 2025 the restaurant was named one of America's Classics by the James Beard Foundation.

== History ==
The restaurant opened in 1939 as a sandwich shop on Clairborne Avenue. It moved to Orleans Avenue in 1941 by owners Emile and Dooky Chase and five years later, their son and daughter-in-law Edgar "Dooky" Chase Jr. and Leah Chase took over. They "turned the sandwich shop into one of the few upscale establishments available for the city's African American community to dine and socialize."

In the 1950s and 1960s the restaurant was known as a place for civil rights leaders to safely "meet and strategize." During the 1955 Godchaux Sugar Refinery Strike, the restaurant was frequented by labor leaders planning for the lunch counter protests of Jerome Smith, Oretha Castle Haley, and Rudy Lombard. The restaurant was hit by a bomb thrown by someone in a passing car in May 1965, resulting in minor damage to the building and no injuries.

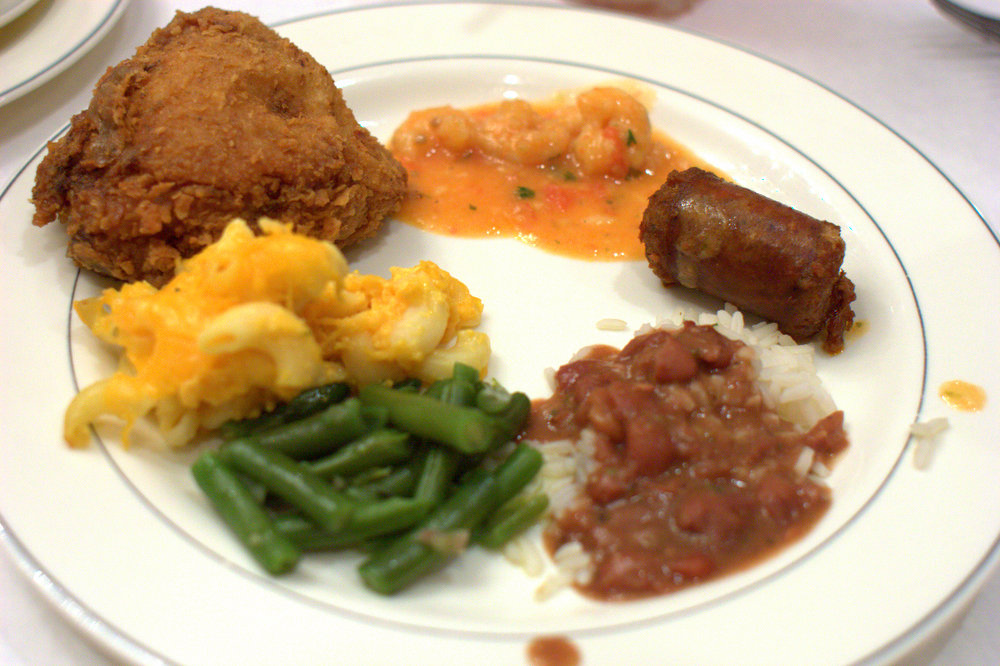
Combo lunch plate, 2012

Ray Charles wrote about the restaurant in his version of Louis Jordan's song "Early in the Morning" with the lyrics "I went to Dooky Chase to get something to eat. / The waitress looked at me and said, 'Ray, you sure look beat.' / Now, it's early in the morning ... / I ain't got nothin' but the blues."

In 2024, legendary singer-songwriter Bob Dylan provided an endorsement of Dooky Chase's Restaurant on the social media site X.com: "Last time in New Orleans [sic] we ate at Dooky Chase's Restaurant on the corner of North Miro and Orleans. If you're ever there I highly recommend it."

On January 16, 2026, a 19-year-old man fleeing a gunman ran into the restaurant. The shooter followed him inside and opened fire inside the foyer, killing the man and wounding three women who were visiting New Orleans.

== Honors and awards ==
The National Trust for Historic Preservation has said Leah Chase has been recognized internationally as the "Queen of Creole Cuisine."

The National Trust for Historic Preservation and American Express awarded them one of 25 $40,000 Backing Historic Small Restaurants grants. In 2018, Food & Wine named it one of the 40 most important restaurants of the past 40 years. In May 2021, it was named one of 15 places on the Louisiana Civil Rights Trail.

In 2025 it was named one of America's Classics by the James Beard Foundation.
