= Kesey Square =

Public square in Eugene, Oregon, U.S.

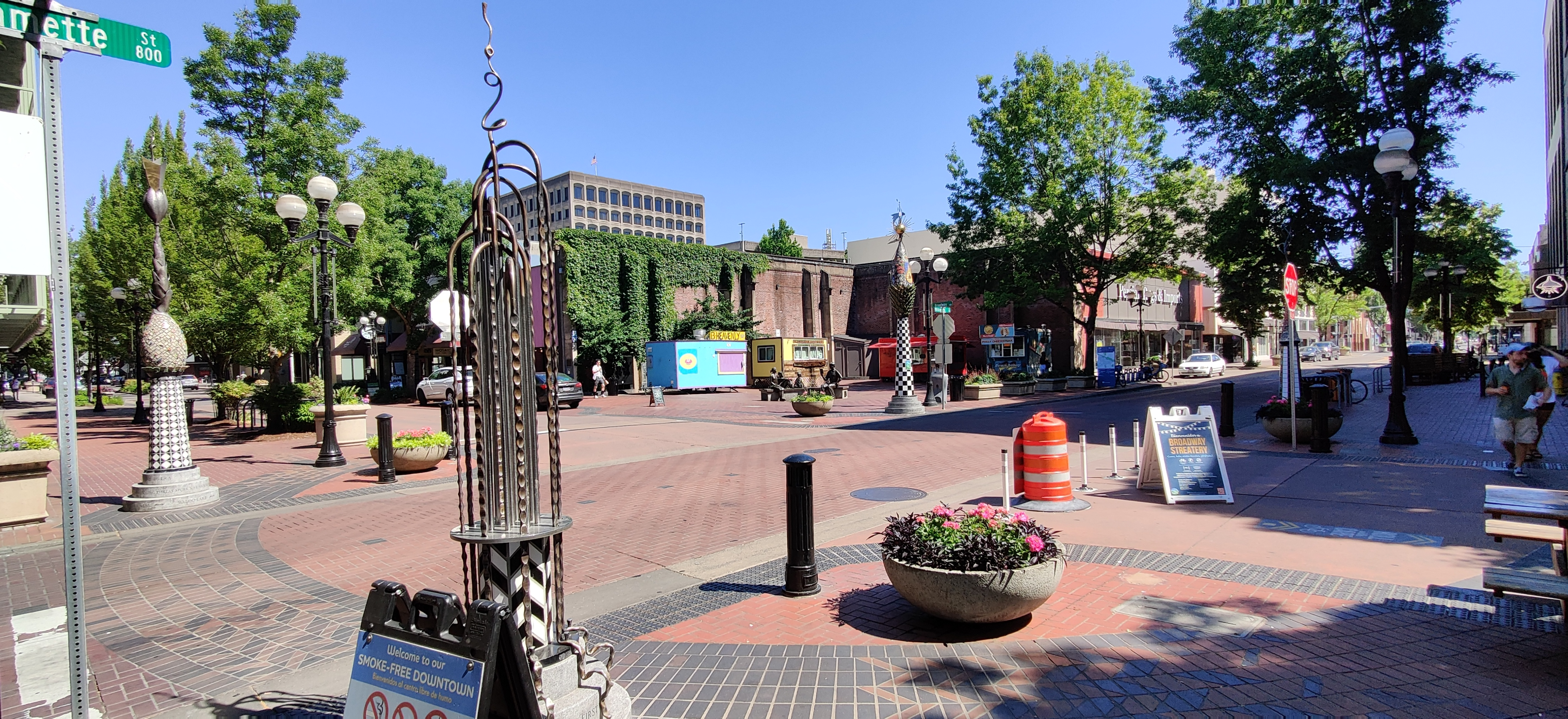

- Location within Oregon
- Type: Public square
- Location: Eugene, Oregon, U.S.
- Coordinates: 44.04975°N 123.09255°W

Kesey Square, formerly known as Broadway Plaza, is a public square at the southeast corner of Broadway and Willamette Street in downtown Eugene, Oregon, in the United States. The square was renamed to commemorate novelist and countercultural figure Ken Kesey in October 2017.

== See also ==
- The Storyteller (sculpture)
