= The Welcome Table =

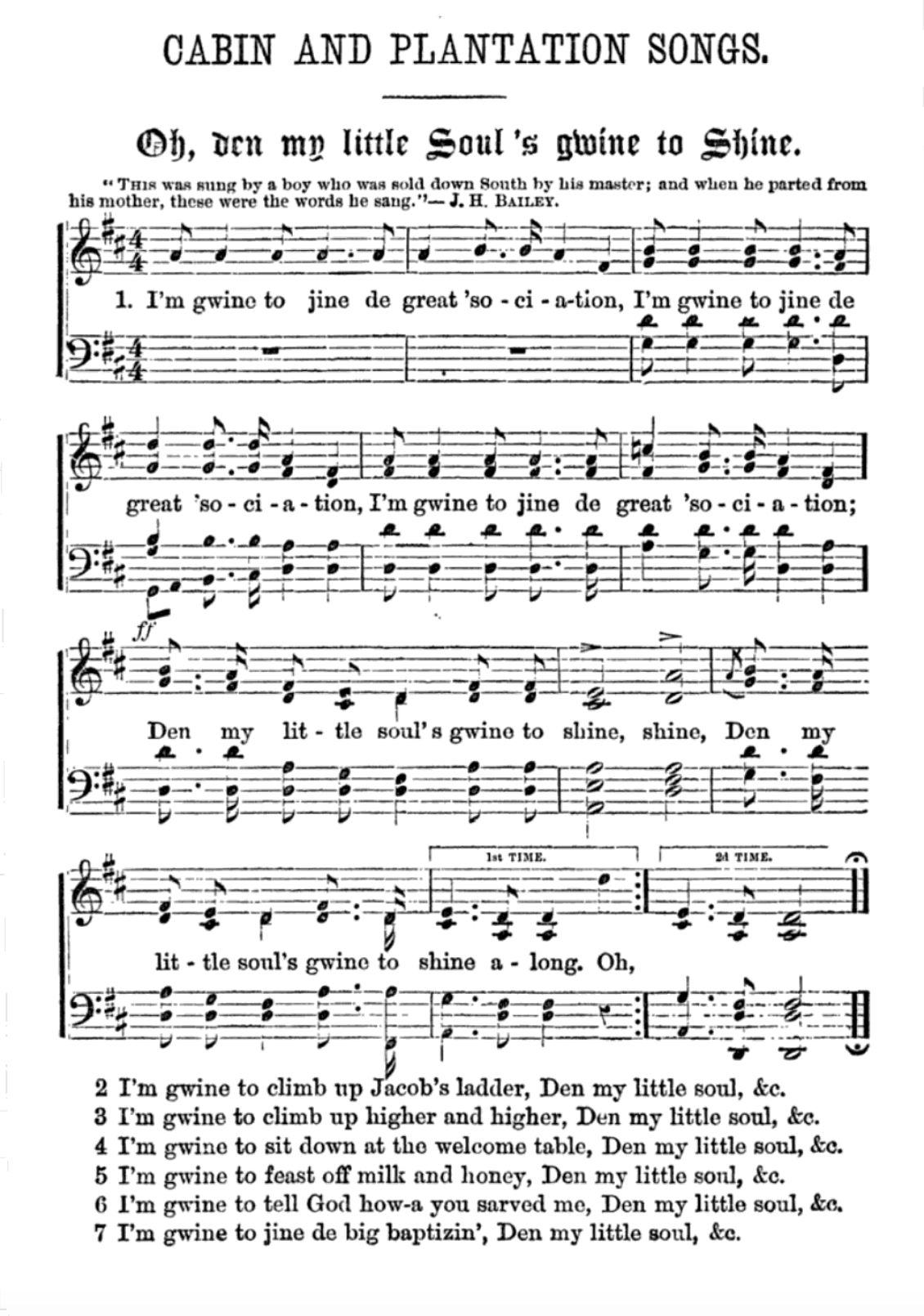
An early version of "The Welcome Table" song in Hampton and Its Students (1874) indicating it was sung by a child who was separated from his mother in slavery

"The Welcome Table" (also known as the "I'm Gonna Sit at the Welcome Table", or "River of Jordan", or "I'm A-Gonna Climb Up Jacob's Ladder" or "God's Going to Set This World on Fire") is a traditional American gospel and African American folk song by an anonymous author, who was likely enslaved.

In 1874 a version of the song was collected by Thomas P. Fenner and published by the Hampton Institute indicating that it was sung by a child in slavery who was being separated from his mother.

The song describes

"the marriage feast of the Lamb referred to in the New Testament Book of Revelation. This event takes place when those who put their trust in the Jesus Christ are joined with him in heaven. African-Americans bound in slavery were never welcome to their master’s table and this song echoed their hope of the tables turning in future glory."

In 1922 the Florida Normal Quartet first recorded the song as "The Welcome Table". In 1936 the Carter Family recorded a variation of the song as the "River of Jordan". In the 1950s and 1960s the song was modified (and known as the "Freedom Table") and served as an anthem of the Civil Rights Movement as one of the Freedom Songs.

American novelist Alice Walker wrote a short story of the same name.
