= The Storyteller (sculpture) =

Bronze sculpture by Pete Helzer in Eugene, Oregon, U.S.

- The sculpture in 2015
- Artist: Pete Helzer
- Type: Sculpture
- Medium: Bronze
- Subject: Ken Kesey
- Location: Eugene, Oregon, United States; 44.04980°N 123.09259°W

The Storyteller, also known as the Ken Kesey Memorial, is an outdoor bronze sculpture by Pete Helzer, installed at Kesey Square (located at Broadway and Willamette Street) in Eugene, Oregon, in the United States. Unveiled in 2003, it depicts American novelist, essayist, and countercultural figure Ken Kesey reading to his three grandchildren, Kate Smith, Caleb Kesey and Jordan Smith. Plaques on the base of the sculpture contain excerpts from Kesey's novels One Flew Over the Cuckoo's Nest (1962) and Sometimes a Great Notion (1964).

== History ==
According to Art Daily, the estimated cost of US$120,000 was covered by a variety of sources, "including Phil Knight, Paul Newman, Michael Douglas, Mason Williams, Miloš Forman, Phil Lesh, Bob Weir, Tom Robbins, Larry McMurtry, Jean Auel, Tom Wolfe, Ed McClanahan, Kenny Moore, Sterling Lord, Dale Wasserman, Rolling Stone magazine, Viking Penguin, Rich Brooks, Dave Frohnmayer, Brian Booth, the Chambers Foundation, and Bill Walton".

In October 2016, the Eugene City Council began considering a proposal from a local development group to buy the square, remove the sculpture, and replace the open space with apartments. Kesey Square (formerly known as Broadway Plaza), in downtown Eugene, is viewed as "valuable open space by some and as an eyesore by others". Some downtown merchants have complained about nuisance behavior of "travelers", transients who gather at the plaza, using drugs or alcohol, harassing customers.

A local merchant who owns property adjacent to the square submitted a second proposal, an update of his 1995 proposal that the Council had rejected. That proposal is to remove brick walls around the square, building a brewery and kitchen incubator, but leaving the sculpture intact. A supporter of the "Save Kesey Square" Facebook page expressed the sentiment, "Public space creates and increases consciousness about what we can create and what we can imagine."

According to The Register-Guard, "The city is considering three options for the space: its sale or lease for private redevelopment (including plans for a six-story apartment building with first-floor eateries and retail shops); a public improvement project; or leaving it as is."

== See also ==
- A Parade of Animals, Salem
