= Television News of the Civil Rights Era 1950–1970 =

"Television News of the Civil Rights Era 1950-1970" is a digital history project produced by Dr. William Thomas and the Virginia Center for Digital History at the University of Virginia. The project considers the role of Southern television during Virginia's Massive Resistance campaign in opposition to the Brown v. Board of Education decision. The national coverage of the Civil Rights Movement transformed the United States by showing Americans the violence and segregation of African Americans' journey for their civil rights.

Local television news in Virginia in the 1950s was more balanced than the print media. The current archive contains films from two local television stations in Virginia, WDBJ Roanoke and the WSLS Roanoke. About 230 films have been digitized. The work is primarily made up of streaming video of televised news stories, with transcripts of the desegregation debate in Virginia, including contemporary interviews with Governors Thomas B. Stanley and J. Lindsay Almond. Thomas also includes several interpretive essays, primary source documents, Martin Luther King Jr., Richard M. Nixon, original footage of school desegregation, public meetings, interviews with citizens, and suggested classroom applications. Thomas is now a professor of history at the University of Nebraska–Lincoln.

== Local television news ==
In Roanoke, Virginia, WSLS (NBC) and WDBJ (CBS) most often covered key events in the late 1950s and early 1960s that would set them apart from white-owned newspapers. The WSLS television news station was very considerable of the voice, time, and attention towards the white leadership, but it also presented various numbers of stories covering the affairs of African Americans especially in Virginia. It has been owned by the principals of the [Shenandoah Life Insurance, a company that has a strong tie to federal employee organizations in District Colombia and a few links to conservative Virginia Democratic Party Operatives. The surviving film footage from the stations that covered civil rights approximately covered forty-four percent of the film prominently featured or presented African American spokespeople. WSLS coverage on the school closing crisis in 1958-1959 included both voices of Virginia's massive resistance program. Later federal and state courts ordered integration in Virginia that would put an end to all massive resistance laws. Virginia's Governor Lindsay Almond considered taking some drastic steps to prevent integration in all schools. This led to repealing the provision in Virginia's constitution that required the state to maintain free and public schools. However, later Almond decided to scrap the massive resistance and search for more effective methods of resistance. WSLS saw it important that Almond retreat from massive resistance because it was seen as a turning point for segregation. The white-owned newspapers covered Almond's speech, not as a turning point but as an admission of failure. The Richmond News Leader was a more conservative white paper that emphasized that white leaders were "powerless" in front of federal authority yet still called for massive resistance to shift gears toward minimizing desegregation.

=== Negro Democratic Rally ===
In 1960, WSLS presented the news with a different picture of the Democratic party on October 7 on the evening news. Democratic presidential candidate John F. Kennedy and Republican rival Richard Nixon were both stumping in Virginia. Several key Democrats were backing up Kennedy, including Governor Lindsay Almond and state party chair Sidney Kellam. Desegregation began in some schools, yet there was still a lot of resistance towards desegregation. When WSLS broadcast African American Democratic Party rally, the political stakes were very high for a changing party. Meanwhile, television news WDBJ, CBS affiliate, covered events of desegregation in careful detail. The reporters interviewed state legislators, political leaders, school board officials, and citizens which included extensive comments from African American lawyers and the NAACP officials. The balance between the presence of multiple voices represented a big difference between the television and print medium. WDBJ's interview with NAACP attorney Oliver Hill demonstrated a clear statement that Virginians were ever to hear about why segregation was wrong.

== Role of television ==
There was a big rise in the consumerism of the television in the United States that showed a technological advancement with a significant influence on public self-perception, the spread of information, shaping the norms and standards, and framing all social dialogue. In the 1960s, African Americans watched 68% more TV than any other non-blacks. Because so many watched a lot of television, African Americans began to notice the lack of representation, biased reporting, and rampant racism. Blacks in the 1950s were usually excluded from television unless they acted like entertainers, dumbfounded idiots, or devoted servants. Later in the 1960s blacks were given the opportunity for more dominant roles such as Bill Cosby, but still misrepresented blacks because it took on the roles and norms of a white society. Television propelled the Civil Rights Movement in the 1960s by introducing civil rights campaigns, protests, attacks, and awareness in general onto local and national TV stations. When Northern states saw Southern violence they were shocked, other blacks that saw it became angered, and it brought enough attention and awareness that carried the civil rights information all the way to the White House. Television had the power to define reality, to create understandings of societal norms, and to shape opinions.

As civil rights events occurred in America in 1963, the nation had their eyes on Birmingham, Alabama, and Jackson, Mississippi. There was a significant difference between what the press covered in the Birmingham campaign versus what the Birmingham's paper covered in their own city. African American children were shown participating in nonviolent, peaceful demonstrations. Commissioner of Public Safety Bull Connor ordered police to physically assault and use the firehose on the children, and brought in dogs to attack the protestors. Television captured one of the most powerful videos of the Civil Rights Movement that clearly showed police brutality. Because of this specific protest and brutality John F. Kennedy felt obligated to create more federal actions.

== See also ==
- Civil rights movement in popular culture
