= Ain't Gonna Let Nobody Turn Me 'Round =

Freedom song

Song
- Genre: Folk

"Ain't Gonna Let Nobody Turn Me 'Round" is a freedom song based on the spiritual "Don't You Let Nobody Turn You Round" and became an American civil rights era anthem. It was sung during demonstrations for civil rights in the United States including during the Memphis sanitation strike in 1968. The song's lyrics are adaptable to situations and locations.

Sweet Honey in the Rock recorded a rendition of the song. The song is performed by Jurnee Smollett in the 1999 television film Selma, Lord, Selma. Imani Uzuri performed the song and it is presented as part of a lesson on freedom songs. The Roots recorded the song for the soundtrack of the 2009 documentary film, Soundtrack for a Revolution.

Richard A. Couto wrote the book Ain't Gonna Let Nobody Turn Me Round; The Pursuit of Racial Justice in the Rural South.

Joan Baez released a live version of this song on her album, From Every Stage (1976).

== See also ==
- Civil rights movement in popular culture
- Protest songs in the United States
