= Rosa L. Parks Scholarship Foundation =

The Rosa L. Parks Scholarship Foundation was founded in 1980 by Detroit Public Schools and The Detroit News.

The foundation awards scholarships to Michigan high school seniors who demonstrate community involvement, academic skill and economic need, and who aspire to the ideals of Rosa Parks.

Approximately forty $2,000 non-renewable scholarships are awarded each year. In total, more than 900 awardees have received over $1.8 million in scholarship money.
