= Statue of Rosa Parks (Eugene, Oregon) =

2009 bronze sculpture of Rosa Parks in Eugene, Oregon, U.S.

Rosa Parks
- The statue in 2015
- Artist: Pete Helzer
- Year: 2009
- Type: Sculpture
- Medium: Bronze
- Subject: Rosa Parks
- Location: Eugene, Oregon, United States; 44.04871°N 123.09414°W

Rosa Parks is an outdoor 2009 bronze sculpture depicting the African-American Civil Rights activist of the same name by Pete Helzer, installed outside the bus station in Eugene, Oregon, in the United States.

== Description and history ==
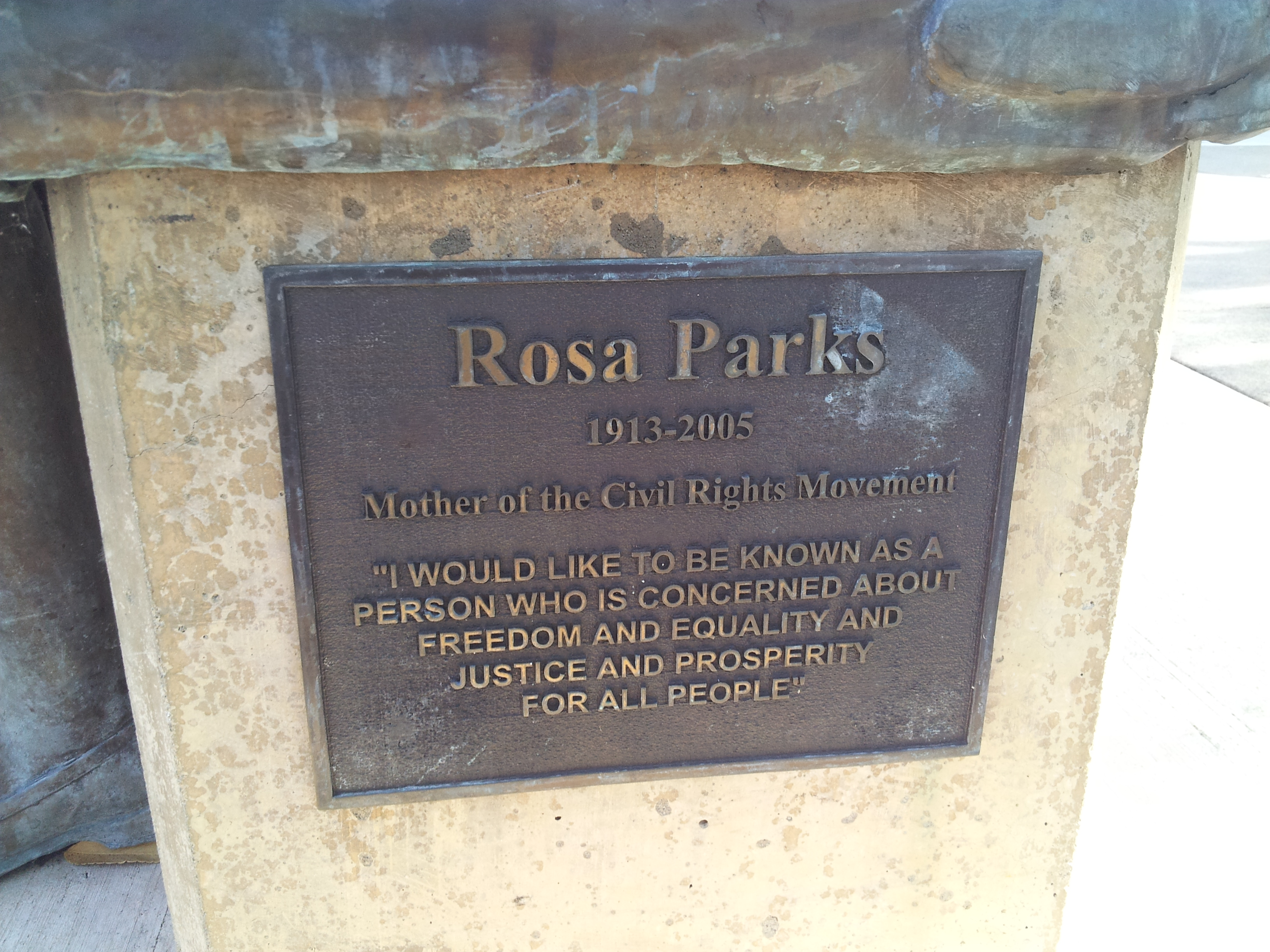
Plaque for the sculpture

Pete Helzer's statue depicting Rosa Parks sitting in a bus seat was unveiled on Martin Luther King, Jr. Day in 2009, the same day Lane Transit District's Eugene Station Plaza was renamed Rosa Parks Plaza, making Eugene the first U.S. city to dedicate a bus station in Parks' honor. The sculpture cost $44,000; the first $10,000 was contributed by Lane Transit District and the remainder was raised from local businesses, civic organizations, community members, and government agencies. Helzer said of the project, "This one had so much attached to it in terms of community interest and community support and it feels good."

Helzer's neighbor, Lacie Heffron, modeled for the sculpture. She said, "I felt very honored and very lucky that I got to be the one who did it."

== See also ==
- 2009 in art
- Civil rights movement in popular culture
- A Parade of Animals, Salem
- Rosa Parks (National Statuary Hall), Washington, D.C.
