= Richard A. Couto =

American history professor and author (1941 – 2017)

Richard Anthony Couto (December 31, 1941 – February 25, 2017) was a teacher, political science professor and author as well as a proponent of service learning.

Couto grew up in Lawrence, Massachusetts. He received a B.A. from Marist College, an M.A. from Boston College and a Phd from the University of Kentucky.

The Tobias Leadership Center at Indiana University interviewed Couto in 2016.

He became a father by marriage and had a daughter with his wife Patricia.

He received several fellowships and awards for his work.

== Writings ==
- Poverty, Politics, and Health Care; The Experience of One Appalachian County University of Kentucky (1973)
- "Failing Health and New Prescriptions; Community-based Approaches to Environmental Health Risks" (1984)
- "Participatory Research: Methodology and Critique" (1987)
- Ain't Gonna Let Nobody Turn Me Round; The Pursuit of Racial Justice in the Rural South Temple University Press (1991)
- "Beyond Distress; New Measures of Economic Need in Appalachia" (1992)
- Lifting the Veil; A Political History of Struggles for Emancipation University of Tennessee Press (1993)
- Making Democracy Work Better; Mediating Structures, Social Capital, and the Democratic Prospect with Catherine S. Guthrie (1999)
- An American Challenge: A Report on Economic Trends and Social Issues in Appalachia Kendall Hunt Pub Co. (1994)
- To Give Their Gifts: Health, Community, and Democracy Vanderbilt University Press (2002) with Stephanie C. Eken
- Reflections on Leadership, editor, University Press Of America (2007)
- Political and Civic Leadership: A Reference Handbook (2010)
