= Three Days as the Crow Flies =

Three Days as the Crow Flies is a novel by art impresario Danny Simmons. A "slice-of-life", all of the events of the book unfold within a three-day period. Published in 2004, Three Days as the Crow Flies gives the reader a glimpse of the 1980s art scene in downtown Manhattan.

== Plot ==
The book opens with Crow Shade, the protagonist, showering and getting dressed for the day. Crow is an African-American who lives in an under-furnished room in a boarding house in the Bedford-Stuyvesant section of Brooklyn. He has an expensive cocaine habit. Withdrawing from the cocaine and desperate for another high, Crow resolves to visit his friend Danny, an artist, and borrow one hundred dollars.

He arrives at Danny's apartment/studio only to find it empty. At that point, Crow impulsively decides to steal three of Danny's paintings and sell them for drug money. On his way out of the apartment, Crow also steals the manuscript that Danny has been working on so that he will have something to read on the train to Manhattan.

Crow eventually ends up in Astor Place and heads for the sculpture in the square. He makes an unsuccessful attempt to sell the paintings before a white man named Bones Young strikes up a conversation. Bones, the son of a wealthy hippies, sells art. He offers to help Crow sell the paintings. After sharing a cigarette the two men head east to the Lower East Side.

When the men arrive on the Lower East Side, they meet up with Candy, an old friend of Bones and a follower of the art scene. The two take him to the art gallery, which had been converted from a bodega. There they meet Geoff, a married straight man who adopts an exaggerated effeminate posture. Geoff racially insults Crow, who pulls his wig off in front of everyone. Crow then tries to leave but Candy stops him and convinces him to stay. Geoff eventually apologizes and offers to host a showing of Crow's work. He also suggests that Crow come up with more paintings as the three he previously showed Geoff aren't enough for a whole shoe.

The group eventually end up at Club Chaos and meet up with Melissa. Melissa is a beautiful fifty-something mixed race woman. She gets Crow to recite poetry with her. After Crow leaves she reads his tarot cards, immediately sensing that there is more to Crow's story than she was led to believe.

Later that night, Crow spends the night with Candy although they don't have sex. Early the next day, Melissa wakes the two by playing a flute underneath Candy's window. The three head to yet another club from there. Bones and Geoff show up and Bones, who has become jealous of the attention that Candy is showing to Crow, elbows Crow in the back of the head. The two men argue for a bit before Candy and Melissa lead Crow out of the club. The trio catches a cab to Melissa's house, a five-story townhouse. The three sleep for a few hours before Melissa wakes Crow up and asks him to paint more paintings for the showing that Geoff arranged for him. Although Crow momentarily worries that he will be found out, he goes downstair in Melissa's studio and, drawing on the information that Danny has imparted to him previously, paints three pictures.

Melissa is impressed with them. She arranges to have a friend, Burt, drive her and the others to the gallery for the showing. When Burt shows up, he insults Crow, touching off another tense confrontation. Melissa defuses the situation by chanting an incantation that terrifies Burt. She demands that she turn over the keys to his car and she, Crow, Candy, and Bones, who had previously arrived, head to the gallery.

The show is a huge success. All of the paintings are sold and Crow makes six thousand dollars minus commission. He is elated but begins to feel guilty about stealing Danny's art work and resolves to give Danny a cut of the money.

Candy, Bones, and Crow then accompany Geoff back to his home in suburban New Jersey (using Burt's car) to help him placate his angry wife. The four then ride back into the city and go to Melissa's house. After getting high again, Crow begins to tire of the non-stop party. Everyone except Bones agrees and they leave Melissa's house. Bones and Crow walk Candy part way home and Crow heads off to Brooklyn. Bones, who does not want to be alone, begs to go along with Crow. Crow reluctantly agrees and the two board the train. Bones falls asleep.

When the two men reach Brooklyn, Crow makes several unsuccessful attempts to wake Bones up. He then decides to leave without him, leaving a note under his arm. Deciding to put off going to Danny's house, Crow steps into the Palm Coast Bar, an after-hours spot and notorious drug den. The police raid the bar. Crow is able to throw his drugs on the floor before the police see him snorting up. He is patted down by a police officer who doesn't find anything on him and leads him toward the door to release him. On the way out, he bumps into Sergeant Dobson, an old friend of Crow's late police officer father.

Sergeant Dobson expresses sorrow that Crow is using drugs and tells Crow that his mother, who hasn't seen him since Crow's father's funeral, is worried about him. He also shares that his own son died of a heroin overdose. He promises to let Crow go if he agrees to go to rehab. Crow, who had already considered getting clean, agrees and accepts Sergeant Dobson's card. Dobson cuffs him and puts Crow into the cruiser (so that the others don't think Crow informed on anyone) and drop him off in front of his house. Crow then makes his way to Danny's house. He decides to tell the complete truth (as well as turn over Danny's share of the money) and ask for Danny's help in getting clean.

== Bibliography ==
- Simmons, Danny (2004). Three Days as the Crow Flies, Washington Square Press, ISBN 978-0-7434-6641-7
