= Woke Up This Morning (With My Mind Stayed On Freedom) =

Freedom song

Song
- Released: 1961

"Woke Up This Morning" is a freedom song created in 1961 from the old gospel song "I woke up this morning with my mind stayed on Jesus". It is one of many similar songs during the civil rights movement.

The song was written by Reverend Robert Wesby of Aurora, Illinois, who sang it in the Hinds County, Mississippi, jail after his arrest and incarceration during the Freedom Rides.

== Background ==
In June 1961, Reverend Robert Wesby (c. 1927–1988) of Aurora, Illinois, created "I Woke Up This Morning with My Mind Stayed On Freedom" while spending time in Hinds County, Mississippi's jail as a Freedom Rider. That autumn, 114 students sang the song at the Burglund High School Walk Out and march to McComb, Mississippi, city hall.

The song spread and became part of the civil rights movement, being one of the most notable pieces among many others. The song is referred to by Pete Seeger in his 1989 book Everybody Says Freedom. It falls under the folk music genre, which was popular in the 1930s and 1940s and was revived in the 1960s during the civil rights movement. Music and singing were an integral part of the movement, many songs being adapted from earlier religious songs.

== See also ==
- Civil rights movement in popular culture
