= Statue of Rosa Parks (U.S. Capitol) =

2013 bronze sculpture

Rosa Parks
- The statue in the National Statuary Hall
- Year: 2013
- Medium: Bronze sculpture
- Subject: Rosa Parks
- Location: Washington, D.C., United States

The Rosa Parks Statue is a 2013 bronze sculpture depicting the African-American civil rights activist of the same name, installed in the United States Capitol's National Statuary Hall, as part of the collection of the Architect of the Capitol. The statue was created by nationally renowned sculptor Eugene Daub and co-designed by Rob Firmin. The statue's full title is Rosa Parks: Taking Her Seat in History, (a revision of the original title Rosa Parks: The Spark That Ignited the Modern Civil Rights Movement). It is the only statue in the Hall not linked with a state, and the first full-length statue of an African American in the Capitol.

== See also ==
- 2013 in art
- Civil rights movement in popular culture
- Statue of Rosa Parks (Eugene, Oregon)
