= Danny Simmons =

American painter (1953–2026)

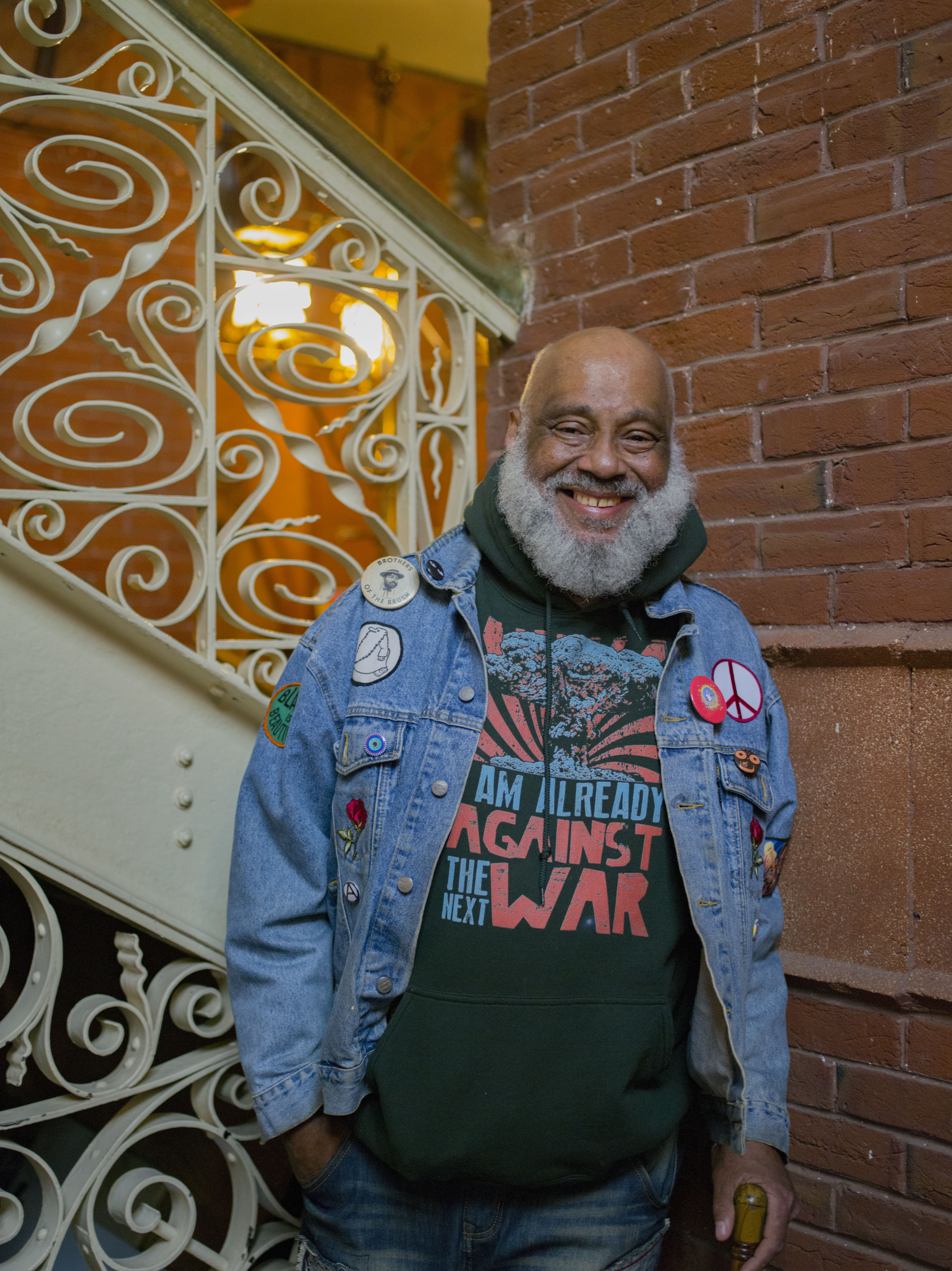
- Simmons in 2019
- Born: August 17, 1953; New York City, U.S.
- Died: June 14, 2026 (aged 72); Philadelphia, Pennsylvania, U.S.
- Known for: Artist, Neo-African Abstract Expressionism
- Relatives: Russell Simmons (brother); Joseph Simmons (brother)
- Awards: TONY, Peabody, NY Mayor Awards for Arts + Culture
- Website: https://dannysimmonsjr.com/

Daniel Dwayne Simmons Jr. (August 17, 1953 – June 14, 2026) was an American abstract expressionist painter, a published author, poet, and philanthropist. He was the older brother of hip-hop impresario Russell Simmons and rapper Joseph Simmons ("Reverend Run" of Run-DMC).

Simmons was the chairman and a co-founder, along with his siblings, Russell, and Joseph “Rev Run” Simmons, of the Rush Philanthropic Arts Foundation, which provides disadvantaged urban youth with arts access and education. He was the founder of Rush Arts Philadelphia and RAP Gallery II, a new solo exhibition/arts education gallery that opened in 2019 and a onetime board member of the Brooklyn Museum, the Brooklyn Public Library, the New York Foundation for the Arts, the National !Conference of Artists, and a past Chairman for the New York State Council on the Arts.

Along with his brother Russell, Simmons established Def Poetry Jam, which has enjoyed long-running success on HBO. In 2004, Simmons published Three Days as the Crow Flies, a fictional account of the 1980s New York art scene.

In 2015 Simmons moved to Philadelphia and opened Rush Arts Philadelphia gallery (RAP) to further the Rush Arts mission and to begin to create a national presence for the service organization. In 2016, he opened Rush Arts Philadelphia and RAP Gallery II, a new solo exhibition/arts education gallery that opened in 2019.

His works appear at the Brooklyn Academy of Music, the Brooklyn Museum, Chase Manhattan Bank, Deutsche Bank, Schomburg Center for Black Culture, The Smithsonian, United Nations, and, on an international scope has shown work in France, Amsterdam and Ghana. In 2019, he was appointed to the Philadelphia Museum of Art's African American Collections Committee.

== Early life ==
Simmons was born on August 17, 1953, in Hollis, Queens, New York City, the son of Daniel Simmons Sr., a truant officer and black history professor who also wrote poetry, and Evelyn Simmons, a teacher who painted as a hobby. Simmons grew up in Hollis, Queens. He earned a degree in social work from New York University and a master's in public finance from Long Island University Brooklyn. He began painting after he realized how much he hated his job with the Bureau of Child Support.

== Artwork ==
Simmons, an abstract expressionist painter's work has been exhibited nationally. His artwork is exclusively represented by Westwood Gallery NYC. Chase Manhattan Bank, Brooklyn Academy of Music, Deutsche Bank, the United Nations, and the Schomburg Center for Research in Black Culture all show his work as part of their collections. On an international scope his work has been exhibited in France, Amsterdam, and Ghana. The Brooklyn museum, as well as the Smithsonian Institution's National Museum of African American History and Culture, have both featured his work. His paintings can often be seen in his published books of poetry. He was also an avid collector of African art and comic books.

In 2019, he was appointed to the Philadelphia Museum of Art's African American Collections Committee.

== Def Poetry Jam ==
Danny Simmons played an instrumental role in the conceiving of and co-producing the hit HBO show Def Poetry Jam, and he won a Tony Award for the Broadway version of the show. Simmons was the co-executive producer of Russell Simmons' Def Poetry, Def Poetry of which episodes were produced for HBO from 2002 to 2007. Simmons came up with the idea for the series when a group of Simmons's friends would gather and perform at open mic nights at art galleries in the early 1990s. The poets did shows at the Nuyorican Poets Café, Danny's home, and an art gallery in Manhattan. Simmons then asked his younger brother Russell about extending the "Def Jam" name in a new direction. After many more live events and showcases Danny and his associates Stan Lathan, Bruce George, and Bob Sumner managed to launch "Def Poetry Jam" as both a cable show and a Broadway production.

== Personal life and death ==
Simmons was married to Keia and had one son. He died at Thomas Jefferson Hospital, Philadelphia on June 14, 2026, at the age of 72.

== Published works ==
- Three Days as the Crow Flies (2003)
- I Dreamed My People Were Calling But I Couldn't Find My Way Home (2007)
- '85: A Graphic Novel (2008)
- The Brown Beatnik Tomes
- Deep in Your Best Reflection: Poems in 160 Characters (2015)
- The Return of Two Dick Willie (2018)

== See also ==
- List of artists from Brooklyn
