= Keep Your Eyes on the Prize =

Folk song

Keep Your Eyes on the Prize
Tune for Keep Your Eyes on the Prize

"Keep Your Eyes on the Prize" is a folk song that became influential during the American Civil Rights Movement of the 1950s and 1960s. It is based on the traditional song, "Gospel Plow," also known as "Hold On," "Keep Your Hand on the Plow," and various permutations thereof.

An early reference to the older song, "Gospel Plow," is in Alan Lomax's 1949 book Our Singing Country. The book references a 1937 recording by Elihu Trusty of Paintsville, Kentucky, which is in the Library of Congress (Ref No .1397 A1). Lomax's references for Gospel Plow cite two earlier works. The first is from English Folk Songs from the Southern Appalachians published in 1917, indicating that Gospel Plow dates from at least the early twentieth century. The second reference is to a 1928 book, American Negro Folk-Songs, which shows an African-American heritage for the original song.

== Possible lyricists ==
The lyrics to the modern Civil Rights version of the song, "Keep Your Eyes on the Prize" are often attributed to Alice Wine from Johns Island, South Carolina. Mrs. Wine was a member of the Moving Star Hall and The Progressive Club on Johns Island. The book Ain't You Got the Right to the Tree of Life by Guy and Candie Carawan documents songs of the Moving Star Hall and the lives of African Americans on Johns Island in the early sixties.

It is doubtful that Mrs. Wine actually composed the lyrics herself. More likely she had heard the revised refrain and variations on the verses of the older song from the congregation at the praise hall. The leading "Paul and Silas" stanzas in the modern "Keep Your Eyes on the Prize" lyrics were already present in some versions of the older "Keep Your Hand on the Plow." Our Singing Country shows these lyrics were already in use in 1949 and before. Odetta used them in her 1960 Carnegie Hall appearance and recording. Mrs Wine is credited by Candie Carawan only with having passed on to Guy Carawan the revision of the title from "Keep Your Hand on the Plow" to "Keep Your Eyes on the Prize."

Lyrics for traditional American folk songs and African-American spirituals are often changed, improvised and traded between songs by different artists and at different performances. This was and is especially true in the call and response of African American religious music. For example, Mahalia Jackson, in her 1958 performance of "Keep Your Hand on the Plow", begins with the couplet "Mary had three links of chain, Every link bearin' Jesus name." Bob Dylan also sings these lyrics in his upbeat version of "Gospel Plow." Carl Sandburg, in his 1927 book The American Songbag, attributes these lyrics to yet another song entirely, "Mary Wore Three Links of Chain." Modern choral arrangements of this song sound entirely different from either the Eyes-Prize or Hand-Plow songs. Both Sandburg in the preface to his book and folk singer Pete Seeger in the opening remarks to his Carnegie Hall performance of "Keep Your Eyes on the Prize" note the malleability of American and African-American folk music. No one artist can be historically credited with "Keep Your Eyes on the Prize."

== Biblical references ==
The title of the modern song may be a reference to the Bible verse in Phillipians 3:17 "keep your eyes on those who live as we do" and verse 14, "I press on toward the goal for the prize of the upward call of God in Christ Jesus."

The "Gospel Plow" title is also shown as a reference to Luke 9:62: "No one who puts a hand to the plow and looks back is fit for service in the kingdom of God."

The "Paul and Silas" lyrics are clearly a Biblical reference to Acts 16:19-26. Here are the lyrics minus refrain:

Paul and Silas, bound in jail
Had no money for to go their bail

Paul and Silas began to shout
Doors popped open, and all walked out

Well, the only chains we can stand
Are the chains between hand and hand

And the biblical passages:

Acts 16:19-26 New International Version

... they seized Paul and Silas and dragged them into the marketplace to face the authorities. 20 They brought them before the magistrates and said, "These men are Jews, and are throwing our city into an uproar 21 by advocating customs unlawful for us Romans to accept or practice."

22 The crowd joined in the attack against Paul and Silas, and the magistrates ordered them to be stripped and beaten with rods. 23 After they had been severely flogged, they were thrown into prison, and the jailer was commanded to guard them carefully. 24 When he received these orders, he put them in the inner cell and fastened their feet in the stocks.

25 About midnight Paul and Silas were praying and singing hymns to God, and the other prisoners were listening to them. 26 Suddenly there was such a violent earthquake that the foundations of the prison were shaken. At once all the prison doors flew open, and everyone's chains came loose

== Performances and recordings ==
=== Keep Your Eyes on the Prize ===
- Ida Sand The Gospel Truth, 2011.
- Pete Seeger Live Performance at Carnegie Hall, June 8, 1963. - Video on YouTube.
  From Seeger's introduction: "Last October, I had the privilege of singing in one of the Negro churches in Albany, Georgia. Of course you know my going down there was like taking coals to Newcastle."
- Len Chandler, Joan Baez, Bob Dylan, Peter Paul and Mary, The Freedom Singers and Theodore Bikel performed together live at The March on Washington for Jobs and Freedom on August 28, 1963. - Video on YouTube
- Mavis Staples - Video on YouTube
- Bruce Springsteen - Video on YouTube
- Joss Stone - Video on YouTube
- Sara Groves - Video on YouTube
- The Freemans - Video on YouTube
- Sweet Honey in the Rock - Video on YouTube
- G Tom Mac - Video on YouTube

=== Keep Your Hands on the Plow ===
- Mahalia Jackson with Duke Ellington, Newport Jazz Festival, 1958. Video on YouTube
- Odetta, Live, Carnegie Hall, April 1960 (with Bill Lee, Spike Lee's father, on bass) Video on YouTube
- The Calamity Janes Video on YouTube

=== Gospel Plow ===
- Bob Dylan - Video on YouTube
- Robert Plant - Video on YouTube

== Namesakes ==
- The noted 1987 PBS documentary series about the Civil Rights Movement, Eyes on the Prize, was named for the song, and the song is used in each episode as the opening theme music.
- The 1993 Maya Angelou book Wouldn't Take Nothing for My Journey Now is titled after a lyric in the song.

== Published versions ==
- Rise Up Singing, page 60

== See also ==
- Civil rights movement in popular culture
