= 2021 in art =

The year 2021 in art involved various significant events.

== Events ==
- January 28 - Sandro Botticelli's Portrait of a Young Man Holding a Roundel sells at Sotheby's New York from the estate of Sheldon Solow for US$92.2M ($80M hammer price), around nine times the previous record for this painter.
- March - In New York City the Metro Pictures Gallery, known for its stable of Pictures Generation artists, such as; Cindy Sherman, Robert Longo, and Richard Prince announces that it will close in December.
- March 11 - A digital Non-fungible token (NFT) artwork Everydays: the First 5000 Days by the artist Beeple sells at Christie's for a world record of $69.35 million US after beginning with a $100 estimate.
- March 12 - A bronze statue of the late U.S. Supreme Court Justice Ruth Bader Ginsburg by the Australian duo Gillie and Marc (as part of the "Statues for Equality" series) is installed and unveiled at City Point in Ginsburg's home New York city borough of Brooklyn three days shy of what would have been her 88th birthday.
- March 22 - The world's largest canvas painting (at over 17,000 square feet) Journey of Humanity by Sacha Jafri sells at auction in Dubai for 228 million Dirham ($62 million US) making it the fourth highest price ever paid for a work by a living artist. The artist then donates his proceeds to charity.
- April 15 - 'The Church', an arts center founded by the visual artists Eric Fischl and April Gornik opens in Sag Harbor, New York on the East End of Long Island.
- May 5 - The first major art fair to take place in more than a year in New York City, Frieze, opens at The Shed at Hudson Yards.
- June
  - Two 17th-century old master European paintings (one by Dutch artist Samuel van Hoogstraten of a boy wearing a red hat and one a self-portrait by the Italian painter Pietro Bellotti) are found in a garbage dumpster at a roadside service station in the region of Bavaria in Germany.
  - Greece recovers two paintings stolen from the National Gallery of Greece in 2012, Woman's Head by Pablo Picasso (1939) which the artist donated in honor of the nation's resistance against the Nazis during World War 2 and Mill by Piet Mondrian (1905) hidden under bushes in a forest.
- August - Artworks in the style of Banksy appear across East Anglian towns in England. These works are subsequently confirmed by the artist's social media apparatus to be by Banksy and are further revealed to be named A Great British Spraycation en totale.
- October 23 - A collection of Picasso paintings and ceramics from the Bellagio resort in Las Vegas sells at auction for almost US$110M.
- November - Ron English's giant immersive installation Sugar Circus opens in Shenzhen, PRC at the beginning of a world tour.
- November 16 - Diego and I (Diego y yo) (1949) by Frida Kahlo sells for $34.9 million at Sotheby's in New York City setting a new record price for a work by a Latin American artist and in the process shattering the previous mark of $9.7 million US set in 2017 by the artist's husband Diego Rivera's 1931 work The Rivals at Christie's in New York City.

== Exhibitions ==
- January 28 until July 18 - Georg Baselitz: Pivotal Turn at the Metropolitan Museum of Art in New York City.
- January 30 until April 25 - Emma Amos: Color Odyssey at the Georgia Museum of Art in Athens, Georgia - then travels to the Munson-Williams-Proctor Arts Institute in Utica, New York (June 19 to September 12, 2021), and the Philadelphia Museum of Art (October 9, 2021, to January 2, 2022).
- February 11 until May 23 - Helen Frankenthaler: Late Works, 1990 - 2003 at the New Britain Museum of American Art in New Britain, Connecticut.
- February 17 until June 6 - Grief and Grievance: Art and Mourning in America (originally conceived by Okwui Enwezor) at the New Museum of Contemporary Art in New York City.
- February 20 until June 30 - Jan Cybis paintings at the Opera Gallery, Grand Theatre in Warsaw, Poland.
- February 25 until September 6 - Kaws: What Party at the Brooklyn Museum in Brooklyn, New York
- March 5 until June 13 - Aleksander Kotsis (1836-1877) Shades of Realism at the Szołayski Museum a division of the National Museum in Kraków, Poland.
- March 5 until July 18 - Lorraine O'Grady: Both/And at the Brooklyn Museum in Brooklyn. New York.
- March 7 until August 8 - Soutine / de Kooning: Conversations in Paint at the Barnes Foundation in Philadelphia.
- March 22 until August 1 - Alice Neel: People Come First at the Metropolitan Museum of Art in New York City.
- March 25 until August 8 - Julie Mehretu at the Whitney Museum of American Art in New York City.
- April 10 until October 31 - Kusama: Cosmic Nature at the New York Botanical Garden in The Bronx, New York.
- April 16 until March 20, 2022 - Franz Erhard Walther at Dia Beacon in Beacon, New York.
- April 17 until October 17 - Monet and Boston: Legacy Illuminated at the Boston Museum of Fine Arts in Boston, Massachusetts.
- April 23 until August 15 - Yayoi Kusama: A Retrospective (A Bouquet of Love I Saw in the Universe) at Gropius Bau in Berlin Germany.
- May 19 until August 23 - Women in Abstraction at the Centre Pompidou in Paris, then traveled to the Guggenheim bilbao from November 22 until February 27, 2022, and the West Bund Museum in Shanghai, PRC from November 11 until March 3, 2023.
- May 29 until September 12, 2021 The Galloway Hoard: Viking-Age Treasure at the National Museum of Scotland in Edinburgh, Scotland
- June 3 until August 27 - Arcmanoro Niles: Hey Tomorrow, Do You Have Some Room For Me: Failure Is A Part Of Being Alive at the Lehman Maupin Gallery in New York City.
- June 4 until October 3 - French Impressionism: From The Museum of Fine Arts, Boston at the National Gallery of Victoria in Melbourne, Australia.
- June 5 until September 26 - Archibald, Wynne and Sulman Prizes 2021 at the Art Gallery of New South Wales in Sydney, Australia.
- June 5 until September 26 - Archie 100 A Century of the Archibald Prize at the Art Gallery of New South Wales in Sydney, Australia.
- June 6 until September 25 - Cézanne Drawing at MoMA in New York City.
- June 12 until October 17 - European Masterpieces from The Metropolitan Museum of Art, New York at the Gallery of Modern Art in Brisbane, Australia.
- June 13 until October 20 - Simphiwe Ndzube: Oracles of the Pink Universe at the Denver Art Museum in Denver, Colorado.
- June 19 until September 19 - Nikolai Astrup: Visions of Norway at the Clark Art Institute in Williamstown, Massachusetts.
- June 26 until October 10 - Artist. Anna Bilińska 1854–1893 at the National Museum in Warsaw, Poland.
- June 26 until October 11 - The Medici: Portraits and Politics, 1512–1570 at the Metropolitan Museum of Art in New York City.
- June 30 until August 13 - Stuart Davis in Havana at the Kasmin Gallery in New York City.
- July 6 until January 2, 2022 - Damien Hirst: Cherry Blossoms at Fondation Cartier pour l'Art Contemporain in Paris.
- July 6, 2021 until January 2, 2022 - Matisse: Life & Spirit Masterpieces from the Centre Pompidou, Paris at the Art Gallery of NSW in Sydney, Australia.
- July 15 until February 20, 2022 - Maurizio Cattelan: Breaths Ghosts Blind at Pirelli HangarBicocca in Milan.
- August 12 until September 25 - The De Luxe Show" curated by Peter Bradley, including works by Walter Darby Bannard, Peter Bradley, Anthony Caro, Dan Christensen, Ed Clark, Sam Gilliam, Richard Hunt, Virginia Jaramillo, Craig Kauffman, Alvin Loving, Kenneth Noland, Jules Olitski, Larry Poons, William T. Williams, and others, at the Karma Gallery in New York City and the Parker Gallery in Los Angeles August 12 until September 18 recreating the original 1971 exhibition held in Houston, Texas.
- September 4 until January 17, 2022 - Joan Mitchell at San Francisco Museum of Modern Art in San Francisco, California then travels to the Baltimore Museum of Art from March 6, 2022 to August 14, 2022.
- September 8 until December 30 - Julian Schnabel: Self-Portraits of Others at the Brant Foundation in New York City.
- September 14 until December 14 - Johnathan Feldschuh: Dynamic Equilibrium at 1GAP Gallery in Brooklyn, New York.
- September 17 until October 30 - David Salle: Tree of Life at Skarstedt Gallery in New York City.
- September 29 until December 19 - Drift: Fragile Future at The Shed at Hudson Yards in New York City, New York.
- September 29 until February 13, 2022 - Jasper Johns: Mind/Mirror at the Whitney Museum of American Art in New York City and simultaneously a corresponding exhibit of the same title through the same dates at the Philadelphia Museum of Art in Philadelphia, Pennsylvania.
- September 30 until December 23 - Erna Rosenstein Once Upon a Time at Hauser & Wirth in New York City.
- September 30 until January 9. 2022 - By Her Hand Artemisia Gentileschi and Women Artists In Italy, 1500 – 1800 at the Wadsworth Atheneum in Hartford, Connecticut then travels to the Detroit Institute of Arts in Detroit, Michigan from February 5, 2022 until May 29, 2022.
- September 30 until February 27, 2022 - Jenny Saville (curated by Sergio Risaliti) at the Museo Novecento in Florence, Italy.
- September 30 until November 23 - Valerie Hegarty: Gone Viral at the Malin gallery in New York City.
- October 8 until May 8, 2022 - Sargent, Whistler, and Venetian Glass: American Artists and the Magic of Murano at the Smithsonian Museum of American Art in Washington DC.
- October 9 until February 13, 2022 - Color into Line: Pastels from the Renaissance to the Present (curated by Furio Rinaldi) at the Fine Arts Museums of San Francisco in San Francisco, California.
- October 11 until January 30, 2022 - Surrealism Beyond Borders at the Metropolitan Museum of Art in New York City. then travels to the Tate Modern in London from February 24, 2022 until August 29, 2022.
- October 16 until March 27, 2020 - Daniel Spoerri: The Theater of Objects at the Museum of Modern and Contemporary Art of Nice (MAMAC) in Nice, France.
- October 20 until January 2, 2022 - Martin Margiela at the Lafayette Anticipations Foundation in Paris, France.
- October 21 until November 21 - Sciarsism and Sciarsists at the Moscow Museum of Modern Art in Moscow, Russia.
- November 4 until December 18 - Neo Rauch: The Signpost at the David Zwirner Gallery in New York City.
- November 6 until February 6, 2022 - Ursula von Rydingsvard: Nothing But Art at the National Museum, Kraków and simultaneously at the Center of Polish Sculpture, Orońsko and Łazienki Park in Warsaw, Poland.
- November 19 until June 19, 2022 - Andy Warhol: Revelation at the Brooklyn Museum in Brooklyn, New York.
- November 20 until March 13, 2022 - Matisse: Life & Spirit Masterpieces from the Centre Pompidou, Paris at the Art Gallery of NSW in Sydney, Australia.
- November 21 until January 21, 2022 - Vilhelm Hammershøi: Light and silence at the National Museum, Poznań in Poznań, Poland.
- November 29 until October 2022 - Cajsa von Zeipel at the Rubell Museum in Miami, Florida.

== Works ==
- Ron English - Sugar Circus
- Rashid Johnson - Red Stage at Cooper Square / Astor Place in New York City
- Nicolas Party - Draw the Curtain at the Hirshhorn Museum in Washington D.C.

=== Graphic works ===
- Banksy
  - Painting for Saints
  - Valentine's Banksy
- Christian Grijalva - We Stand with You, Portland, Oregon, U.S.
- David Hockney - A Year in Normandie (digital frieze)
- Whitney Holbourn - Say Their Names, Louisville, Kentucky, U.S.
- Dana Schutz - Baggage
- Black Lives Matter street mural (Seattle City Hall)

=== Sculpture ===
- Tim Bavington - Win, Victory, Love in Burj Park in Dubai, UAE
- Austen Brantley - Statue of Ernest Burke, Havre de Grace, Maryland
- Michelle Browder - Mothers of Gynecology Monument, Montgomery, Alabama
- Chris Carnbauci - Bust of George Floyd in Flatbush, Brooklyn, New York City
- Maurizio Cattelan - Blind
- Alex Da Corte - As Long as the Sun Lasts, the Metropolitan Museum of Art roof commission
- Paul Day - A Beautiful Day in the Neighborhood: Statue of Mister Rogers
- Jordi Díez Fernández - Statue of Rafael Nadal installed at Roland Garros Stadium
- Leonardo Drew - 82S
- Andy Edwards
  - Statue of The Bee Gees in Douglas, Isle of Man
  - Statue of Bob Marley in Liverpool
- Gillie and Marc - Statue of Ruth Bader Ginsburg permanently installed outside 445 Albee Square in Downtown Brooklyn's City Point in New York City
- David Hammons - Day's End in Hudson River Park, New York City
- Richard Hunt - The Light of Truth Ida B. Wells National Monument
- Alicja Kwade - Solid Sky at 550 Madison Avenue in Manhattan, New York City
- Todd McGrain - Bust of York, Portland, Oregon, U.S.
- Amanda Matthews - The Girl Puzzle monument honoring Nellie Bly on Roosevelt Island in New York City
- Portia Munson - Bound Angel
- David Mutasa - Statue of Mbuya Nehanda
- Liam O'Connor (architect), David Williams-Ellis (sculptor) and Richard Kindersley (lettering) - British Normandy Memorial
- Zak Ové - The Mothership Connection
- Luke Perry - Phil Lynott Monument in West Bromwich, England
- Ian Rank-Broadley - Statue of Diana, Princess of Wales in the Sunken Garden of Kensington Palace in London
- Yinka Shonibare - Moving Up
- Tom Tsuchiya - Statue of Marian Spencer, Cincinnati
- Benjamin Victor - I will have your back always...
- Basil Watson - Hope Moving Forward
- Stanley J. Watts - Statue of George Floyd
- Statue of Ken Shimura, Tokyo

=== Films ===
- Black Art: In the Absence of Light
- Make Me Famous
- The Lost Leonardo
- This Is a Robbery

== Awards ==
- Wynne Prize - Nyapanyapa Yunupingu

== Deaths ==
- January 1 - Jan de Bie, 74, Dutch artist
- January 5 - Kim Tschang-yeul, 91, French-Korean painter
- January 21 - David McCabe, 80, British photographer
- January 22 - Forrest Moses, 86, American painter
- January 24
  - Arik Brauer, 92, Austrian artist, co-founder of the Vienna School of Fantastic Realism
  - Barry Le Va, 79, American conceptual artist
- January 26 - Cindy Nemser, 83, American art historian and art critic
- January 30 - Bill Hammond, 74, New Zealand artist
- February 7 - Luis Feito, 91, Spanish painter
- February 16 - James Bishop, 93, American painter
- February 19 - Arturo Di Modica, 80, Italian-born American sculptor (Charging Bull)
- March 1
  - Sir Alan Bowness, 93, British art historian, art critic, and director of the Tate Gallery (1980–1988)
  - Toko Shinoda, 107, Japanese artist
- March 4 - Barbara Ess, 73, American photographer
- March 7 - Duggie Fields, 75–76, British artist
- March 18
  - Elsa Peretti, 80, jewelry designer and visual arts philanthropist
  - Jean-Michel Sanejouand, 86, French sculptor
- March 28 - Gianluigi Colalucci, 92, Italian conservator-restorer (Restoration of the Sistine Chapel frescoes)
- April 4 - Jean Dupuy, 95, French born American srtist
- April 20 - Mary Beth Edelson, 88, American artist
- April 23 - Hans Rasmus Astrup, 82, Norwegian businessman, art collector, and museum founder (Astrup Fearnley Museum of Modern Art).
- April 25 - William T. Wiley, 83, American interdisciplinary visual artist
- April 30 - Eli Broad, 87, American businessman, art collector, philanthropist, and museum co-founder (The Broad)
- May 4 - Julião Sarmento, 72, Portuguese multimedia artist and painter
- May 5 - Susanna Heller, 65, American and Canadian painter
- May 11
  - Richard Nonas, 85, American sculptor
  - Riitta Vainionpää, 69, Swedish textile artist, (death announced on this date)
- May 19 - Alain Kirili, 74, French American sculptor
- May 20 - Ingvar Cronhammar, 73, Swedish-Danish sculptor៛ (Elia)
- May 26 - Roser Bru, 98, Spanish-born Chilean painter and engraver
- May 29
  - Dani Karavan, 90, Israeli sculptor (Monument to the Negev Brigade)
  - Judith Godwin, 91, American painter
- June 2 - Jane Kaufman, 83, American artist
- June 7 - Douglas S. Cramer, 89, American art collector
- June 10 - Tomás Llorens Serra, 84, Spanish art historian and museologist, director of IVAM (1986–1988), MNCARS (1988–1990) and Thyssen-Bornemisza Museum (1991–2005)
- June 16
  - Allen Midgette, 82, Warhol superstar
  - Mogens Møller, 86, Danish minimalist artist
- June 18 - Gérard Fromanger, 81, French artist
- June 19 - Arnold Odermatt, 96, Swiss photographer
- June 21 - Diego Cortez, 74–75, American art curator (death announced on this date)
- June 23 - Arturo Schwarz, 97, Italian art historian and writer
- July 12 - Joseph Raffael, 88, American painter
- July 14 - Christian Boltanski, 76, French sculptor, photographer, and painter
- July 26 - Louise Fishman, 82, American painter
- July 27 - Phillip King, 87, British sculptor
- July 28
  - Nancy Frankel, 92, American sculptor
  - Ben Wagin, 91, German visual artist
- August 3 - Yolanda López, 78, American painter and printmaker
- August 12
  - Stanislav Hanzík, 90, Czech sculptor
  - K. Schippers, 84, Dutch poet and art critic
- August 19 - Chuck Close, 81, American painter.
- August 23
  - Elizabeth Blackadder, 89, Scottish painter
  - Yusuf Grillo, 86, Nigerian artist
- September 6 - Billy Apple, 85, New Zealand artist
- September 28 - Achille Pace, 98, Italian painter
- October 3 - Lars Vilks, 75, Swedish visual artist, founder of Ladonia
- October 12 - Julie L. Green, 60, American artist
- October 14 - Margo Leavin, 85, American art dealer
- October 16 - Paul Blanca, 62, Dutch photographer
- October 18 - Manuel Neri, 91, American sculptor
- October 20 - Nyapanyapa Yunupingu, 76, Australian Yolngu painter
- October 22 - Lía Bermúdez, 91, Venezuelan sculptor
- October 25 - Patrick Reyntiens, 95, British stained glass artist
- October 29
  - Iran Darroudi, 85, Iranian artist
  - Raoul Middleman, 86, American painter
- November 2 - Bettina Grossman, 94, American artist
- November 12 - Dave Hickey, 82, American art critic
- November 14 - Etel Adnan, 96, American artist
- November 17 - Jimmie Durham, 81, American sculptor and poet
- November 18 - Mick Rock, 72, British photographer (death announced on this date)
- November 20 - Carlo Maria Mariani, 90, Italian painter
- November 20 - Rita Letendre, 93, Canadian painter
- November 21 - Robert Bly, 94, American writer and critic
- November 28
  - Virgil Abloh, 41, American fashion designer and visual artist
  - Guillermo Roux, 92, Argentinian painter
- December 2 - Lawrence Weiner, 79, American Conceptual artist
- December 17 - Eve Babitz, 78, American visual artist and author
- December 18 - Lord Richard Rogers, 88, Italian-born British architect (Centre Pompidou, Lloyd's building, Millennium Dome)
- December 25 - Wayne Thiebaud, 101, American painter
- December 29 - Sabin Weiss, 97, Swiss-French photographer
