= The Giant (statue) =

Proposed statue

The Giant is a proposed Irish concept that would be the world's tallest moving statue. Inspired by Gulliver's Travels, the work was spearheaded by Paddy Dunning with support from the Berlin-based architecture studio Dan Pearlman and Enterprise Ireland.

The sculpture is designed to sing, speak, and move its arms and head with bespoke technology. The Giant Company hopes to display the statue in 21 cities in 2021. Selected cities have reportedly included Phoenix, Arizona. Others which have expressed interest include Belfast, Berlin, Dubai, Dublin, Las Vegas, London, New York, and Singapore.

== See also ==
- 2021 in art
- List of tallest statues
