= Julie Greene =

Julie Greene may refer to:

- Julie Greene (historian), American historian
- Julie Greene (politician), American politician

== See also ==
- Julie Green, Canadian politician
- Julie L. Green, American artist
