= Ed Freeman =

United States Army Medal of Honor recipient

Ed W. Freeman
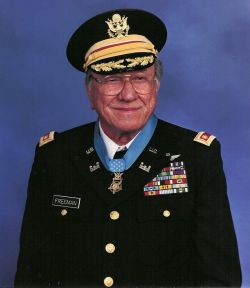
- Freeman in 2001
- Born: November 20, 1927; Neely, Mississippi, U.S.
- Died: August 20, 2008 (aged 80); Boise, Idaho, U.S.
- Burial place: Idaho State Veterans Cemetery, Boise, Idaho
- Military career
- Allegiance: United States
- Branch: United States Navy (1944–1946); United States Army (1948–1967)
- Service years: 1944–1946; 1948–1967
- Rank: Major
- Nickname: Too Tall
- Units: Company A, 229th Assault Helicopter Battalion, 1st Cavalry Division (Airmobile)
- Conflicts: World War II; Korean War; Battle of Pork Chop Hill; Vietnam War; Battle of la Drang
- Awards: Medal of Honor; Distinguished Flying Cross (3); Bronze Star; Purple Heart; Air Medal (16)

Ed W. "Too Tall" Freeman (November 20, 1927 – August 20, 2008) was a United States Army helicopter pilot who received the United States military's highest decoration, the Medal of Honor, for his actions in the Battle of Ia Drang during the Vietnam War. During the battle, he flew through machine gunfire 14 times, bringing supplies to a trapped American battalion and flying dozens of wounded soldiers to safety. Freeman was a wingman for Major Bruce Crandall, who also received the Medal of Honor for the same missions.

== Early life ==
Freeman was born in Neely, Greene County, Mississippi, the sixth of nine children. When he was 13 years old, he saw thousands of men on maneuvers pass by his home in Mississippi. He knew then that he would become a soldier.

Freeman grew up in nearby McLain, Mississippi, and graduated from Washington High School. At age 17, before graduating from high school, Freeman served in the United States Navy for two years. After the war, he returned to his hometown and graduated from high school. He joined the United States Army in September 1948, and married Barbara Morgan on April 30, 1955. They had two sons: Mike, born in 1956, and Doug, born in 1962.

== Military career ==
=== World War II ===
During World War II, Freeman served for two years in the United States Navy on the USS Cacapon (AO-52).

=== Korean War ===
By the time of the Korean War, Freeman reached the army rank of first sergeant. Although he was in the Corps of Engineers, his company fought as infantry soldiers in Korea. He participated in the Battle of Pork Chop Hill and earned a battlefield commission as one of only 14 survivors out of 257 men who made it through the opening stages of the battle. His second lieutenant bars were pinned on by General James Van Fleet personally. He then assumed command of B Company and led them back up Pork Chop Hill.

The commission made him eligible to become a pilot, a childhood dream of his. However, when he applied for pilot training he was told that, at six feet four inches, he was "too tall" for pilot duty. The phrase stuck, and he was known by the nickname of "Too Tall" for the rest of his career. In 1955, the height limit for pilots was raised and Freeman was accepted into flying school. He first flew fixed-wing army airplanes before switching to helicopters. After the Korean War, he flew the world on mapping missions.

=== Vietnam War ===
By the time Freeman was sent to Vietnam in 1965, he was an experienced helicopter pilot and was placed second-in-command of his sixteen-aircraft unit. He served as a captain in Company A, 229th Assault Helicopter Battalion, 1st Cavalry Division (Airmobile).

On November 14, 1965, Freeman and his unit transported a battalion of American soldiers to the Ia Drang Valley. Later, after arriving back at base, they learned that the soldiers had come under intense fire and had taken heavy casualties. Enemy fire around the landing zones was so heavy that the landing zone was closed to medical evacuation helicopters. Freeman and his commander, Major Bruce Crandall, volunteered to fly their unarmored, lightly armed UH-1 Huey in support of the embattled troops. Freeman made a total of fourteen trips to the battlefield, bringing in water and ammunition and taking out wounded soldiers under heavy enemy fire in what was later named the Battle of Ia Drang.

Freeman was subsequently promoted to the rank of major, designated as a Master Army Aviator, and was sent home from Vietnam in 1966.

=== Medal of Honor ===
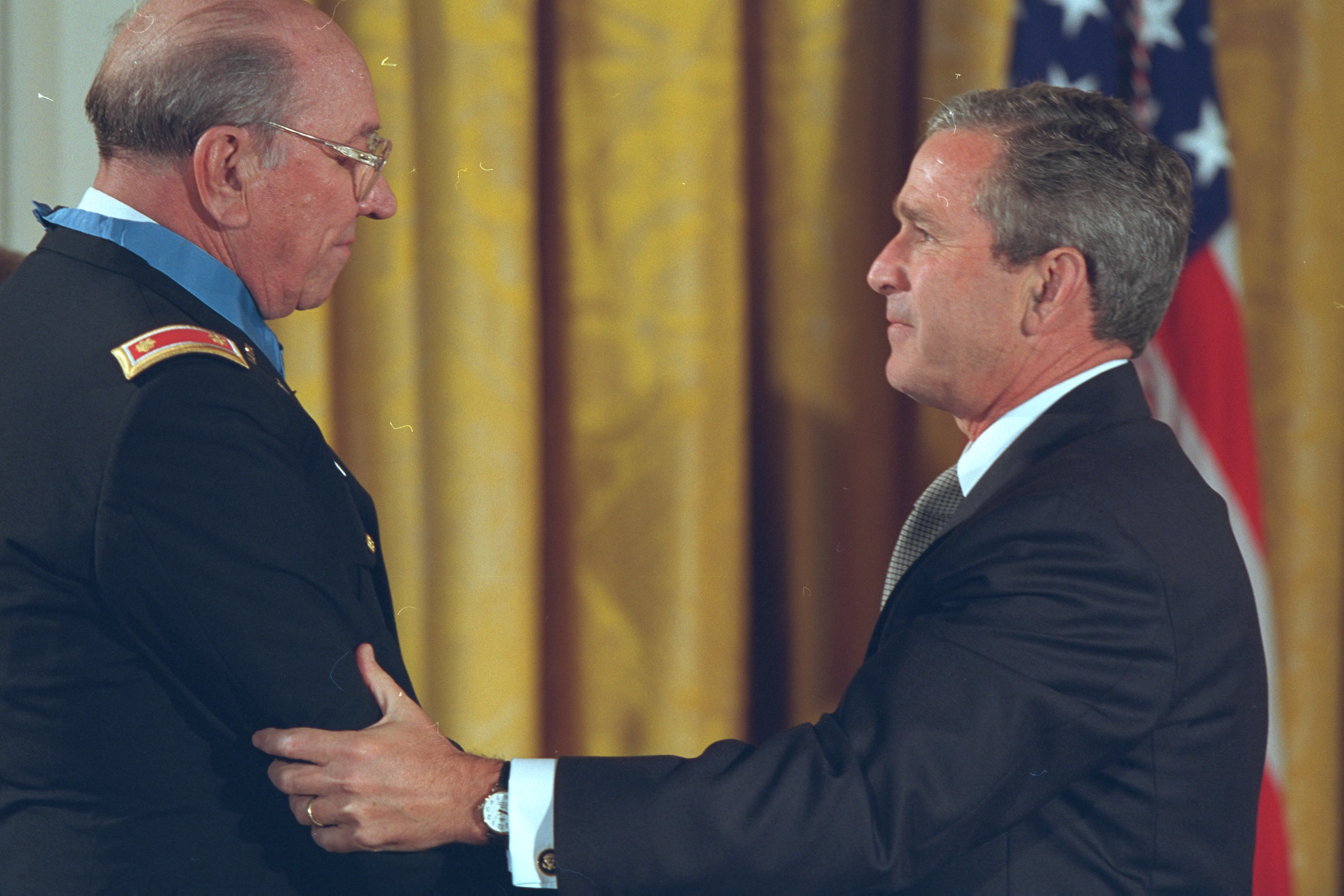
Ed Freeman (left) is congratulated by President George W. Bush after receiving the Medal of Honor.

Freeman's commanding officer nominated him for the Medal of Honor for his actions at Ia Drang, but not in time to meet a two-year deadline then in place. He was instead awarded the Distinguished Flying Cross. The Medal of Honor nomination was disregarded until 1995, when the two-year deadline was removed. He was formally presented with the medal on July 16, 2001, in the East Room of the White House by President George W. Bush.

Freeman's official Medal of Honor citation reads:

Captain Ed W. Freeman, United States Army, distinguished himself by numerous acts of conspicuous gallantry and extraordinary intrepidity on 14 November 1965 while serving with Company A, 229th Assault Helicopter Battalion, 1st Cavalry Division (Airmobile). As a flight leader and second in command of a 16-helicopter lift unit, he supported a heavily engaged American infantry battalion at Landing Zone X-Ray in the Ia Drang Valley, Republic of Vietnam. The unit was almost out of ammunition after taking some of the heaviest casualties of the war, fighting off a relentless attack from a highly motivated, heavily armed enemy force. When the infantry commander closed the helicopter landing zone due to intense direct enemy fire, Captain Freeman risked his own life by flying his unarmed helicopter through a gauntlet of enemy fire time after time, delivering critically needed ammunition, water and medical supplies to the besieged battalion. His flights had a direct impact on the battle's outcome by providing the engaged units with timely supplies of ammunition critical to their survival, without which they would almost surely have gone down, with much greater loss of life. After medical evacuation helicopters refused to fly into the area due to intense enemy fire, Captain Freeman flew 14 separate rescue missions, providing life-saving evacuation of an estimated 30 seriously wounded soldiers – some of whom would not have survived had he not acted. All flights were made into a small emergency landing zone within 100 to 200 meters of the defensive perimeter where heavily committed units were perilously holding off the attacking elements. Captain Freeman's selfless acts of great valor, extraordinary perseverance and intrepidity were far above and beyond the call of duty or mission and set a superb example of leadership and courage for all of his peers. Captain Freeman's extraordinary heroism and devotion to duty are in keeping with the highest traditions of military service and reflect great credit upon himself, his unit and the United States Army.

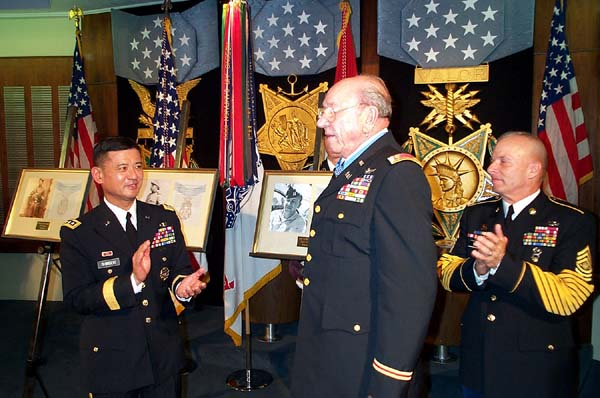
After receiving the Medal of Honor, Ed Freeman was inducted into the Pentagon's Hall of Heroes on July 17, 2001. Army Chief of Staff General Eric Shinseki (left) officiated and was assisted by Sergeant Major of the Army Jack L. Tilley (right).

== Awards and decorations ==
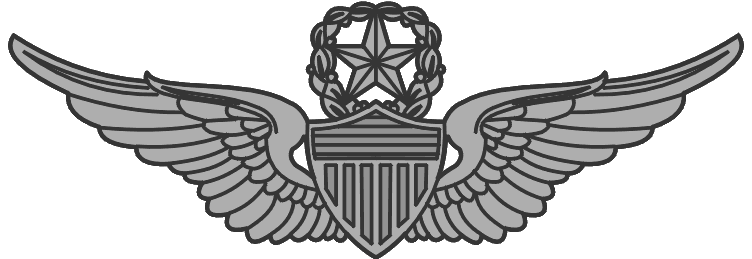

Master Army Aviator Badge
Medal of Honor
Distinguished Flying Cross w/ 2 bronze oak leaf clusters	Bronze Star Medal w/ Valor device	Purple Heart
Air Medal w/ 3 silver oak leaf clusters	Army Commendation Medal	Army Good Conduct Medal
American Campaign Medal	Asiatic-Pacific Campaign Medal	World War II Victory Medal
Army of Occupation Medal	National Defense Service Medal w/ 1 oak leaf cluster	Korean Service Medal w/ 3 bronze campaign stars
Vietnam Service Medal w/ 2 bronze campaign stars	Armed Forces Reserve Medal	Vietnam Cross of Gallantry w/ 1 Gold Star
United Nations Korea Medal	Vietnam Campaign Medal	Republic of Korea War Service Medal

Republic of Korea Presidential Unit Citation	Republic of Vietnam Gallantry Cross Unit Citation with Palm

== Civilian life ==
Freeman retired from the military in 1967. Freeman and his family settled in the Treasure Valley area of Idaho, his wife Barbara's home state. He continued to work as a pilot. He flew helicopters for another 24 years, fighting wildfires, conducting animal censuses, and herding wild horses for the Department of the Interior until his second retirement in 1991. By then, he had 17,000 flight hours in helicopters, 22,000 overall.

== Death and legacy ==
Freeman died on August 20, 2008, due to complications from Parkinson's disease. He was buried with full military honors at the Idaho State Veterans Cemetery in Boise.

In the 2002 film We Were Soldiers, which depicted the Battle of Ia Drang, Freeman was portrayed by Mark McCracken.

The post office in Freeman's hometown of McLain, Mississippi, was renamed the "Major Ed W. Freeman Post Office" in March 2009.

On Thursday, December 9, a section of State Route 98 in Greene County was designated as the “Major Ed ‘Too Tall’ Freeman Memorial Highway” in honor of the late Major Ed Freeman.

== See also ==
- List of Medal of Honor recipients for the Vietnam War
