= Cajsa von Zeipel =

Swedish sculptor (born 1983)

Cajsa von Zeipel (born 23 November 1983) is a Swedish sculptor born in Gothenburg, now living and working in New York City. She is most known for her current post-human works created in pastel colored silicone.

Von Zeipel's work is the subject of the 2015 book Pro Anatomy which features essays by writers Andrew Durbin, Chris Ford, Stefanie Hessler, Sarah Nicole Prickett, and Lyndsy Welgos.

Her two sculptures, Post Me, Post You and Celesbian Terrain at the 2022 New York City edition of the Frieze Art Fair at The Shed created a stir. During the 2021-22 season, the Rubell Museum hosted a solo exhibition of Von Zeipel's sculptures and installations. Von Zeipel's work Seconds in Ecstasy (2010) is held in the permanent collection of the Gothenburg Museum of Art and currently on display is the art institution's sculpture hall.
