= USS Cacapon =

Cimarron-class oiler

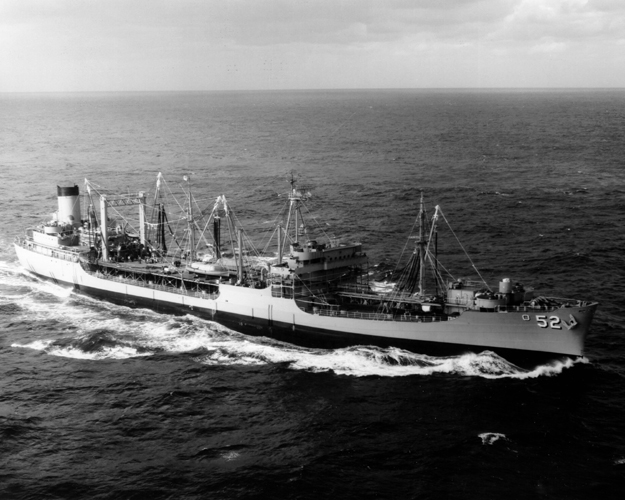
- USS Cacapon

History

United States
- Name: USS Cacapon
- Namesake: Cacapon River in West Virginia
- Builder: Bethlehem Shipbuilding Corporation, Bethlehem Sparrows Point Shipyard, Sparrows Point, Maryland
- Launched: 12 June 1943
- Sponsored by: Mrs. A. V. Doherty
- Acquired: 21 September 1943
- Commissioned: 21 September 1943
- Decommissioned: August 1973
- Stricken: August 1973
- Fate: Sold for scrap

General characteristics
- Class & type: Cimarron-class oiler
- Type: T3-S2-A3 tanker hull
- Displacement: 7,236 long tons (7,352 t) light; 25,440 long tons (25,848 t) full load
- Length: 553 ft (169 m)
- Beam: 75 ft (23 m)
- Draft: 32 ft (9.8 m)
- Propulsion: Geared turbines, twin screws, 30,400 shp (22,669 kW)
- Speed: 18 knots (33 km/h)
- Capacity: 146,000 barrels (23,200 m^{3})
- Complement: 314
- Armament: 1 × 5 in (130 mm)/38 cal. gun; 4 × 3 in (76 mm)/50 cal. guns; 4 × twin 40 mm AA guns; 4 × twin 20 mm AA guns

Service record
- Operations: World War II, Korean War, Vietnam War
- Awards: 4 battle stars and Navy Unit Commendation (World War II); 9 battle stars (Korea)

USS Cacapon (AO-52) was a T3 Cimarron-class fleet oiler acquired by the U.S. Navy during World War II. She served her country primarily in the Pacific Ocean Theater of Operations, and provided petroleum products where needed to combat ships. For performing this dangerous task, she was awarded battle stars and citations during World War II, the Korean War, and the Vietnam War.

Cacapon was launched 12 June 1943 at Bethlehem Sparrows Point Shipyard, Sparrows Point, Maryland, under a Maritime Commission contract; sponsored by Mrs. A. V. Doherty; acquired by the Navy 21 September 1943; and commissioned the same day. The name is derived from a Shawnee word meaning "medicine waters". Cacapon River and Cacapon Mountain are in West Virginia.

== Service history ==
=== World War Two ===
Cacapon served in the Pacific Theater during WWII. On 22 October 1943 she sailed from Norfolk, Virginia, to load fuel at Aruba in the West Indies en route to Pearl Harbor, where she arrived 12 November. On 30 November she rendezvoused with the U.S. 5th Fleet to deliver fuel at sea to the ships carrying out the Gilbert Islands operation. After a west coast overhaul, she returned to Pearl Harbor, from which she sailed 3 February 1944 to carry her vital logistic support to task force TF-50, then engaged in the Marshall Islands operation. She carried fuel on which all modern naval warfare depends to units of the U.S. 3rd Fleet from March into May, as the mighty task forces sent their strikes against Rabaul, Kavieng, Green, Emirau, and the Admiralties. During a part of this period, she served temporarily with the U.S. 7th Fleet's service support group for the New Guinea operation.

Cacapon served as station tanker successively at Efate and Espiritu Santo, New Hebrides; Port Purvis on Florida Island in the Solomons; and Manus, Admiralty Islands where she was damaged by the November 1944 USS Mount Hood (AE-11) explosion. On 8 January 1945 she cleared Manus for Ulithi. Here she reported to the 3rd Fleet, and between 12 and 27 January her operations supported task force TF-38 during its series of strikes against Luzon and Formosa supporting the Philippine attacks and consolidation. Cacapon lengthened the list of operations to which she had given vital support as she steamed with the 5th Fleet during the Iwo Jima operation, from 15 to 26 February, and the Okinawa operation from 24 March to 30 June. Between these, she served briefly as station tanker in San Pedro Bay, Philippine Islands.

Cacapon brought her essential aid to the 3rd Fleet in its final devastating air attacks and bombardments on the Japanese home islands in July 1945, and on 20 September entered Tokyo Bay. Ten days later she cleared for San Pedro, California, arriving for overhaul 11 October. She returned to the Far East in December, providing support to occupation forces with a shuttle service between Yokohama, Japan, and Shanghai and Qingdao, China.

=== Post War ===
In April 1946 she sailed to Bahrain in the Persian Gulf to load oil for delivery to Kwajalein Atoll, where her cargo was to be used during Operation Crossroads. However, on the first day at sea, 24 April, she ran on Shah Allum Shoal in the Persian Gulf. While the current pulled her clear, her engine and fire rooms began to flood and all power was lost. Aided by SS Fort Erie, SS Fort Stanwick, and USS Chikaskia (AO-54), Cacapon put back to Bahrain for temporary repairs, and proceeded to San Pedro, California, for permanent repairs.

On 2 December 1946, Cacapon cleared San Pedro, California, for 10 weeks in the Antarctic in Operation Highjump. She called at Sydney, Australia, en route Long Beach, California, returning home 8 April 1947. Between 1947 and 1950 she cruised in the Pacific on two extended Far Eastern tours.

=== Korean War ===
Far Eastern operations continued to be the rule for Cacapon when war broke out in Korea in June 1950; she completed four lengthy tours of duty there during the three years of fighting. Sailing with the U.S. 7th Fleet and the Formosa Patrol Force, she carried fuel and supplies to these sea forces. On her first tour, during which she helped to support the amphibious landing at Inchon on 15 September 1950, she earned the Navy Unit Commendation for her high performance of duty.

From the end of hostilities in Korea through 1960, Cacapon made six more Far Eastern tours, continuing to sail with the 7th Fleet and the Taiwan Patrol Force. In 1958 she served as the oiler replenishing the ships in Operation Hardtack, which conducted nuclear bomb tests in the lagoons of Bikini and Eniwetok, Marshall Islands.

=== Vietnam War ===
During her 1955 tour she took part in the evacuation of the Tachen Islands from 6 to 14 February, and the Vietnam evacuation "Operation Passage to Freedom" of 6 to 15 March. From February to August 1958, she joined in Operation Hardtack I at Bikini Atoll. The intervals between deployments have found her operating locally from Long Beach, California.

== Fate ==
Cacapon was decommissioned, and struck from the Navy List in August 1973 and transferred to the Maritime Administration for disposal. She was scrapped by Zidell Exploration Portland, Oregon.

== Awards ==
Cacapon received four battle stars for World War II service, and the Navy Unit Commendation and nine battle stars for Korean War service. Medal of Honor winner Ed Freeman served aboard Cacapon during World War II.

== Cold case murder ==
In 1968 24-year-old Ensign Andrew Muns, who was serving aboard Cacapon, disappeared along with $8,600 from the ship's safe while it was moored in the Philippines. The original US Navy investigation concluded that Ensign Muns was a thief who had taken the cash and deserted his post. However, 30 years later in 1998 the case was reopened by NCIS at the insistence of Muns's sister. A subsequent cold case investigation led to former Cacapon supply clerk Michael LeBrun. After a lengthy interrogation, LeBrun confessed to strangling Muns to death because the ensign found him stealing the money. LeBrun said he dumped Muns's body along with the missing cash into one of the oiler's fuel tanks. In 2005 60-year-old LeBrun pleaded guilty to a reduced charge of voluntary manslaughter after his video-taped confession to murdering Muns was ruled to have been inadmissible due to a failure to advise the suspect of his Miranda Rights. He was sentenced to four-years imprisonment for the killing in 2006.
