= Ernest Burke =

American baseball player (1924–2004)

- Pitcher
- Born: June 26, 1924; Havre de Grace, Maryland, U.S.
- Died: January 31, 2004 (aged 79); Baltimore, Maryland, U.S.
- Batted: Left Threw: Right

Negro league baseball debut
- 1946, for the Baltimore Elite Giants

Last appearance
- 1948, for the Baltimore Elite Giants
- Stats at Baseball Reference

Teams
- Baltimore Elite Giants (1946–48)

Ernest Alexander Burke (June 26, 1924 – January 31, 2004) was an American professional baseball player in the Negro leagues.

Burke was born in Havre de Grace, Maryland. During World War II, he enlisted in the United States Marine Corps, and was one of the first black U.S. Marines to serve in World War II, earning a medal as a sharpshooter. During his tour of duty in the Pacific, Burke began to play baseball.

After the war, he became a pitcher and outfielder for the Baltimore Elite Giants in the Negro American League. He played for Baltimore from 1946 to 1949. In 1949, he joined the Pough-Kingston team in the Western League, then later played in the Canadian Provincial League.

Burke died of kidney cancer complications at the age of 79. A statue of Burke was unveiled on June 26, 2021, in his home city.
