= The Beatles Statue =

Monument in Liverpool, England

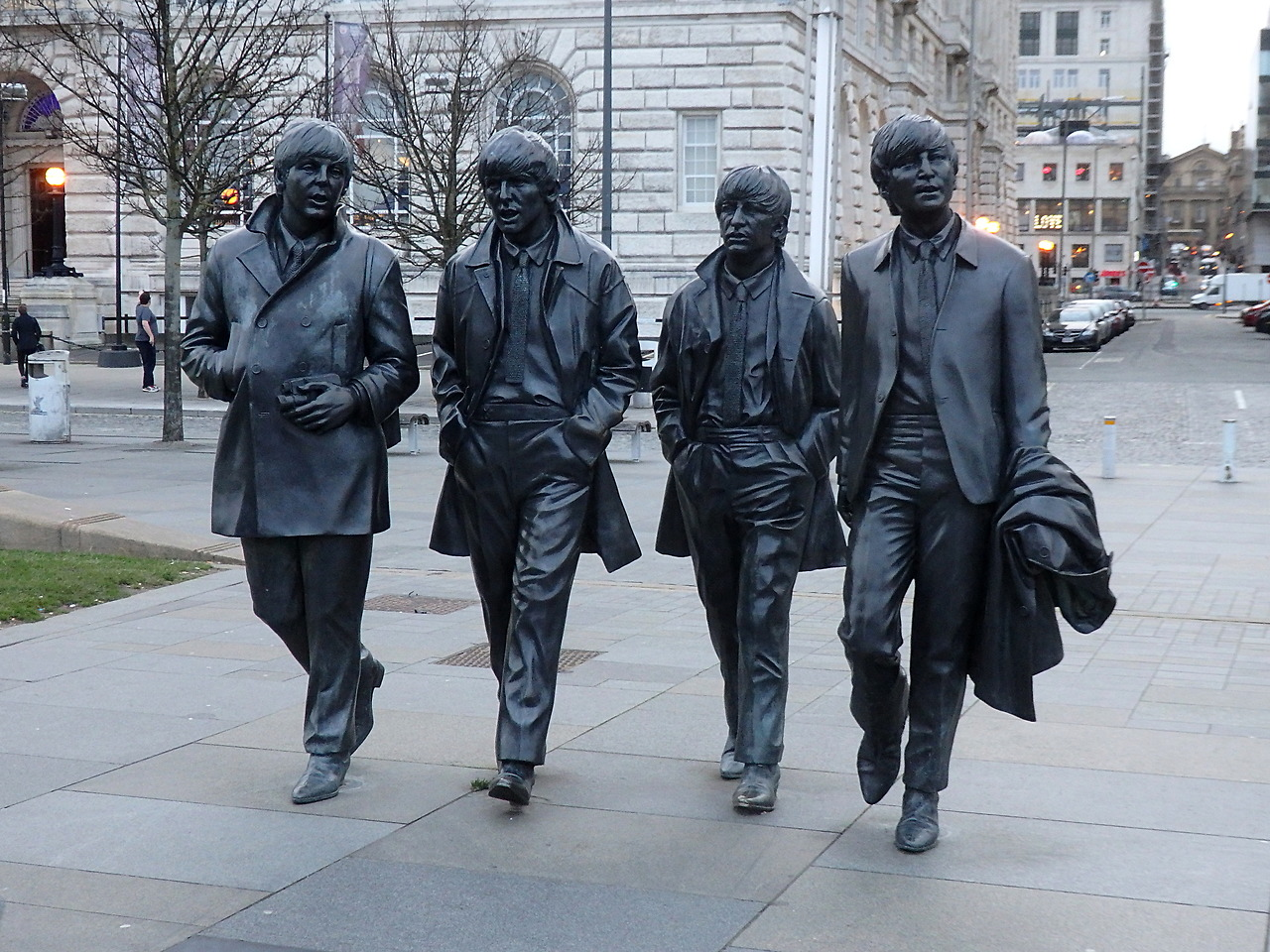
- The monument in 2020.
- Interactive map of The Beatles Statue
- Location: Liverpool, England
- Coordinates: 53.404518°N 2.996405°W
- Designer: Andy Edwards
- Type: Statue
- Material: Bronze
- Opening date: 4 December 2015
- Dedicated to: The Beatles

The Beatles Statue is a monument in Liverpool, England, placed at the Pier Head, near the intersection of Brunswick Street and Canada Boulevard. It was designed by sculptor Andy Edwards, and unveiled on 4 December 2015. It consists of four bronze figures depicting the members of the Beatles: Paul McCartney, George Harrison, Ringo Starr, and John Lennon.

== History ==
The monument was designed by sculptor Andy Edwards. It was donated to the city of Liverpool by The Cavern Club, a local music venue associated with the Beatles, and unveiled on 4 December 2015, by Ann O'Byrne, the city deputy mayor, and Julia Baird, John Lennon's sister. The ceremony coincided with the 50th anniversary of the last concert the band played in Liverpool on 5 December 1965.

== Characteristics ==
The monument is placed in Liverpool at the Pier Head, near the intersection of Brunswick Street and Canada Boulevard. It consists of four bronze statues depicting members of the Beatles, that are, from left to right, Paul McCartney, George Harrison, Ringo Starr, and John Lennon. The figures are larger than their real counterparts, and are depicted walking together through the street. They were based on a photograph of the group, taken at the location in 1963.

McCartney holds a camera near his chest in his left hand, as a tribute to his wife, Linda McCartney, who was a photographer.

Harrison is wearing a belt with a Sanskrit inscription on it, which translates to "The Infinite Beyond Conception, we meditate upon that Light of Wisdom, which is the Supreme Wealth of the Gods. May it grant us to increase in our meditation".

To the sole of Ringo’s right shoe, is attached a card with a postal code "L8", referencing the area of Welsh Streets in which he grew up. He is also set back from the others, representing the order they were typically positioned on stage, with Ringo being behind the others on the drum kit.

In Lennon's right hand are two acorns, which were cast from acorns collected from near The Dakota apartment building in New York City, where he lived and was murdered in 1980. They are a reference to him mailing acorns to world leaders as a message of peace in the 1960s.
