= Statue of Frederick Douglass (College Park, Maryland) =

Statue in College Park, Maryland, U.S.

Frederick Douglass
- Interactive map of Frederick Douglass
- Location: University of Maryland, College Park, Maryland, United States
- Coordinates: 38°59′17.44″N 76°56′31.68″W
- Designer: Andrew Edwards
- Material: Bronze
- Opening date: 2015

The Statue of Frederick Douglass is a public artwork in front of the Hornbake Library at the University of Maryland in College Park, Maryland. The statue memorializes African-American abolitionist, suffragist, and labor leader Frederick Douglass.

== Description and history ==
Unveiled in 2015, the statue was designed by sculptor Andrew Edwards, who was inspired by artwork representing then-president Barack Obama and Moses, and by Douglas' visit to Ireland in 1845. The statue portrays Douglass in the middle of a speech, with one arm outstretched, and a copy of his autobiography under the other arm. The square surrounding the statue features stone pavers and a vertical Corten steel wall with Douglass's words inscribed on them. The cast bronze statue was designed in Ireland and cast in Wales. It stands on a 3-foot-tall base and weighs nearly half a ton. Each of the sides of the base has different words.The side when you first look at Douglass has the words "Frederick Douglass 1818-1895." The side to the right of the statue has the words "Abolitionist, Suffragist, Labor Leader." The back side of the base has the words "Statesman, Diplomat, Founding Father of the Second American Republic." Lastly, the left side of the base has the words "Orator, Journalist, Scholar." Kenneth B. Morris, Jr., Douglass's great-great-great-grandson, said that "I love that the statue shows him in his fiery abolitionist years."

The statue was the result of years of efforts on the part of campus leaders to honor this important Marylander and to reaffirm commitment to social justice. History professor Ira Berlin was part of this group, who called themselves the North Stars after the abolitionist newspaper Douglass edited. According to Berlin, "The vision of myself and the North Stars was to have Frederick Douglass on campus to speak to the question of social justice." Efforts to raise the more than half a million dollars for the square and the statue began in 2011. The statue itself cost $200,000.
