= De'Lance Turner =

American football player (born 1995)

No. 23
- Position: Running back

Personal information
- Born: August 23, 1995 (age 31); McLain, Mississippi, U.S.
- Listed height: 5 ft 11 in (1.80 m)
- Listed weight: 214 lb (97 kg)

Career information
- High school: Perry Central (New Augusta, Mississippi)
- College: Alcorn State
- NFL draft: 2018: undrafted

Career history
- Baltimore Ravens (2018–2019); Miami Dolphins (2019); TSL Jousters (2021); Ottawa Redblacks (2021); Montreal Alouettes (2022)

Awards and highlights
- First team All-SWAC (2017)

Career NFL statistics
- Rushing yards: 10
- Rushing average: 2
- Rushing touchdowns: 0
- Receptions: 2
- Receiving yards: 17
- Stats at Pro Football Reference

Career CFL statistics
- Rushing attempts: 23
- Rushing yards: 132
- Rushing touchdowns: 0
- Receptions: 3
- Receiving yards: 15
- Stats at CFL.ca

De'Lance Turner (born August 23, 1995) is an American former professional football player who was a running back in the National Football League (NFL) and Canadian Football League (CFL). He played college football for the Alcorn State Braves.

== Early life ==
Turner was born and grew up in McLain, Mississippi, and attended Perry Central High School in New Augusta, where he played baseball, basketball, and football. Turner rushed for 519 yards and 7 touchdowns on 70 carries as a senior and was named first-team All-Area and All-District.

== College career ==
Turner began his collegiate career at Copiah–Lincoln Community College and was named MACJC first-team All-State after leading the team with 600 rushing yards as a sophomore. Turner transferred to Alcorn State for his remaining three years of collegiate eligibility. As a senior, Turner rushed for a school-record 1,357 yards, the second-most in the FCS, and 10 touchdowns and earned first-team All-SWAC and third-team AP FCS All-America honors. He finished his collegiate career with 2,121 rushing yards, fifth-highest in school history, and 15 touchdowns.

== Professional career ==
=== Baltimore Ravens ===
Turner signed with the Baltimore Ravens as an undrafted free agent on May 4, 2018. He was waived on September 1, and was re-signed to the practice squad the next day. Turner was promoted from the practice squad to the active roster on September 12, after running back Kenneth Dixon was placed on injured reserve. He made his NFL debut on September 13, against the Cincinnati Bengals, playing on special teams. In Week 4 against the Pittsburgh Steelers, he recorded a four-yard rush and a ten-yard reception. Turner was placed on injured reserve on October 13, with a hamstring injury.

Turner was waived by Baltimore during final roster cuts on August 31, 2019, and was re-signed to the Ravens' practice squad the following day.

=== Miami Dolphins ===
On November 5, 2019, the Miami Dolphins signed Turner off of the Ravens' practice squad. He was waived by Miami on May 16, 2020.

Turner visited the New York Jets on August 13, 2020, and had a tryout with them three days later.

=== Ottawa Redblacks ===
On September 12, 2021, Turner signed with the Ottawa Redblacks. He was released by Ottawa on May 6, 2022.

=== Montreal Alouettes ===
Turner was signed by the Montreal Alouettes on May 15, 2022. He was released by the Alouettes on May 30.
