= Hope Moving Forward =

Statue of Martin Luther King Jr. in Atlanta, Georgia

- The statue in 2023
- Location: Northside Drive, Atlanta, Georgia, United States
- Coordinates: 33.754593°N 84.404168°W
- Designer: Basil Watson
- Type: Statue
- Material: Bronze
- Height: 18 feet (5.5 m)
- Dedicated to: Martin Luther King Jr.

Hope Moving Forward is a public monument in Atlanta, Georgia, United States. Dedicated in 2021, the monument consists of a bronze statue of Martin Luther King Jr. designed by Basil Watson atop a pedestal. It is located at the intersection of Northside Drive and Martin Luther King Jr. Drive.

== History ==
The statue was dedicated in a small ceremony that featured Atlanta Mayor Keisha Lance Bottoms. It was designed by Jamaican sculptor Basil Watson, whose design was selected from among 80 submissions by sculptors. The statue is the second monument to Martin Luther King Jr. unveiled in Atlanta in the past four years, with the statue of King at the Georgia State Capitol unveiled in 2017. According to The Atlanta Journal-Constitution, this statue is the first in a series of seven monuments commissioned by the government of Atlanta in honor of King. A month after Hope Moving Forward was dedicated, the city unveiled additional bronze statues of civil rights activists along Martin Luther King Jr. Drive, including Dorothy Lee Bolden, Rita Jackson Samuels, W. A. Scott, and Hosea Williams.

== Design ==
The monument consists of a statue of King measuring 12 feet (3.7 m) tall atop a pedestal measuring 6 feet (1.8 m) tall. The statue, which is made of bronze, depicts King releasing a dove from his right hand. Watson, speaking about the statue, stated "[i]t was an evolution in terms of my concept of what Martin Luther King represents and the key message that he wanted to present to the world". It is located at the intersection of Northside Drive and Martin Luther King Jr. Drive, near the Mercedes-Benz Stadium. The front of the pedestal bears the following inscription: "DR. MARTIN LUTHER KING JR. / January 15, 1929 – April 4, 1968 / Dedicated by the / CITY of ATLANTA / 2021 / "HOPE MOVING FORWARD" / Sculptor: BASIL WATSON". Additionally, the King quote "Hate cannot drive out hate; Only love can do that" is inscribed on the base.

== See also ==
- 2021 in art
- Memorials to Martin Luther King Jr.
- Civil rights movement in popular culture
