= The Rivals (painting) =

Painting by Diego Rivera

- Artist: Diego Rivera
- Year: 1931
- Medium: Oil on canvas
- Dimensions: 152.4 cm × 127 cm (5.00 ft × 4.17 ft)
- Location: Private collection

The Rivals is a 1931 oil-on-canvas painting by the Mexican artist Diego Rivera (1886–1957). It was commissioned by Abby Aldrich Rockefeller, the leading personage behind the inception of the Museum of Modern Art in New York City. Rivera created the work while on the ship SS Moro en route from Mexico to New York City. The picture portrays "Las Velas", a festival held in the Mexican state of Oaxaca, a fete in honor of local patron saints and of the abundance of spring.

Abby Rockefeller kept the work in her own private collection until 1940 when she bequested it to her son David Rockefeller and his wife Peggy Rockefeller (the former Peggy McGrath) as a wedding present. The couple exhibited the work in the living room of their summer home, Ringing Point, in Maine.

== At auction ==
In 2017, following David Rockefeller's death at the age of 101, the work sold for $9.7 million at auction at Christie's, then a record for a work by a Latin American artist. In 2021 the aforementioned sales mark was shattered when Diego and I (1949) by Rivera's wife, the surrealist painter, Frida Kahlo, was sold at Sotheby's in New York City for $34.9 million US.

It was later revealed that The Rivals had been bought by the tech billionaire Paul Allen in the last year of his life and it was subsequently sold for $14.1 million US (with fees) at the auction of his art collection in November 2022 at Christie's in New York City.

== See also ==
- List of works by Diego Rivera
