= Simphiwe Ndzube =

South African painter

Simphiwe Ndzube (born. 1990 in Hofmeyr, Eastern Cape, South Africa) is a South African painter of Xhosa origin currently living and working in Los Angeles, California and Cape Town, South Africa. He received his BFA from the Michaelis School of Fine Arts at the University of Cape Town in 2015.

Ndzube's first U.S. solo museum exhibition "Oracles of the Pink Universe" was held at the Denver Art Museum from June 13, 2021, until October 20, 2021, and displayed a suite of artworks which are respond to the Dutch/Nederlandish painter Hieronymous Bosch's The Garden of Earthly Delights (1490–1510) and deal with life in Post-apartheid South Africa. Ndzube grew up in a South African township of Masiphumelele, the name of which comes from a Xhosa word meaning "let us succeed". Ndzube's work has been described both the artist himself and others as being in the tradition of "magical realism". He is represented by the Nicodim gallery in New York City and Los Angeles and the Stevenson gallery in South Africa.
