= Celesbian =

Lesbian celebrity

A celesbian (a portmanteau of celebrity and lesbian) is a female celebrity known or reputed to be a lesbian and popular within the LGBT community, or a celebrity who claims to be a lesbian temporarily as a publicity stunt. Celesbianism as a Western media phenomenon came into vogue in 2008, when several female celebrities presented themselves as lesbians. The term was first used by New Yorkers Pam Franco and Susan Levine, a disk jockey. It was used in a full-page ad in a lesbian nightlife magazine, GO MAGAZINE. The ad was for the Mz Hip and Fit NY contest, the idea of Denise Cohen of Denco Designs & Events. The contest was a search for the hottest lesbian in the United States. The term celesbian was used for the celebrity lesbian judges.

== Fauxmosexual ==
In contemporary mass media, the term has come to mean a female celebrity who claims to be a lesbian, either explicitly or implicitly — often to get publicity. She may or may not really be homosexual. A term similar to this second sense of celesbian is fauxmosexual, combining faux (false) and homosexual, in which case the celebrity may be either male or female. Some LGBT activists have objected to the fauxmosexuality phenomenon, saying it trivializes real homosexuals, both in presenting homosexuality as an "outrageous" novelty, and in glossing over the serious issues faced by young people struggling to come to terms with their homosexuality. It is also seen as isolating and stereotypical by "ruining what we are trying to accomplish in showing the world that we are normal human beings like everybody else" by others.

== Examples ==
One of the earliest visible media examples is when Madonna kissed Britney Spears and Christina Aguilera at the 2003 MTV Video Music Awards as documented Kristin Lieb from BuzzFeed News. In 2004, MedicineNet discussed the "Madonna-Britney" influence in the raise of this term. Lieb also cited that Katy Perry's "I Kissed a Girl" accelerated the trend. Others work using queerbaiting and fauxmosexual appeal can be found in "Can't Remember to Forget You" by Rihanna and Shakira, as well Jennifer Lopez's "Booty" with Iggy Azalea.

Other contemporary musical artists Nicki Minaj and Azealia Banks have both publicly expressed their sexual love of women and have been celebrated in doing so. In August 2015, The Austin Chronicle covered Camila Grey's and Kate Moennig's performance at Austin Pride. Kate Moennig plays Shane in The L Word and Lena in Ray Donovan. Ellen DeGeneres publicly came out as a lesbian in 1997 on The Oprah Winfrey Show. When asked by host Oprah Winfrey, "Why did you think it was necessary for you to come out?" Ellen replied, "Because it's okay. Because it is okay." By involving their lesbian sexuality in popular culture, they are doing work to normalize it.

== Ranked listicles and speculative media coverage ==
Mainstream media produces hierarchic ratings of present-day celesbians. In 2015, The Talko electronically published "15 Celesbian Couples Who Are Too Cute To Handle". In 2014, New York Post electronically published "Hot Celesbians Are Everywhere You Look", The Times of India electronically published "Jodie Foster to Ellen DeGeneres: ‘Celesbian’ couples who tied the knot", and Autostraddle electronically published "Gothip Girl’s Top 10 Most Important Celesbian Moments of 2014".
