= Statue of Ernest Burke =

Statue in Havre de Grace, Maryland, U.S.

- Artist: Austen Brantley
- Completion date: 26 June 2021
- Movement: Sculpture
- Subject: Ernest Burke
- Dimensions: 200 cm (78 in)
- Weight: 250 pounds (110 kg)
- Location: Havre de Grace, Maryland, U.S.; 39°32′18.1″N 76°5′24.4″W

A statue of Ernest Burke is a statue of Havre de Grace, Maryland-born baseball player Ernest Burke (1924–2004). It was created by sculptor Austen Brantley and was erected in Havre de Grace's Millard Tydings Memorial Park in 2021.

== Background ==
=== Ernest Burke ===
Burke is a Havre de Grace-born baseball player for the Negro leagues, playing third base and pitcher for the Baltimore Elite Giants from 1946 to 1949. He enlisted to serve in the United States Marine Corps during World War II, becoming one of the Corps' first Black Marines and fought in the Pacific War before military units were racially integrated.

=== Statue ===
In July 2016, the Havre de Grave City Council passed a resolution supporting the erection of a memorial dedicated to Burke, with Mayor Bill Martin hoping to provide funding toward raising the statue in 2017. The statue was unveiled on June 26, 2021 after fundraising efforts led by Camay Calloway Murphy. The statue also features two baseball seats donated by the Aberdeen IronBirds.
