= Statue of Bob Marley =

2021 statue in Liverpool, England

- Artist: Andy Edwards
- Year: 2021
- Subject: Bob Marley
- Dimensions: 2.1 m (7 ft)
- Location: Liverpool, England, United Kingdom; 53°23′43″N 2°58′50″W

A 7-foot (2.1 m) tall statue of Bob Marley by Andy Edwards was installed on Jamaica Street in Liverpool, England, in September 2021. The artwork was commissioned by the Positive Vibration Festival of Reggae.
