= Achille Pace =

Italian painter (1923–2021)

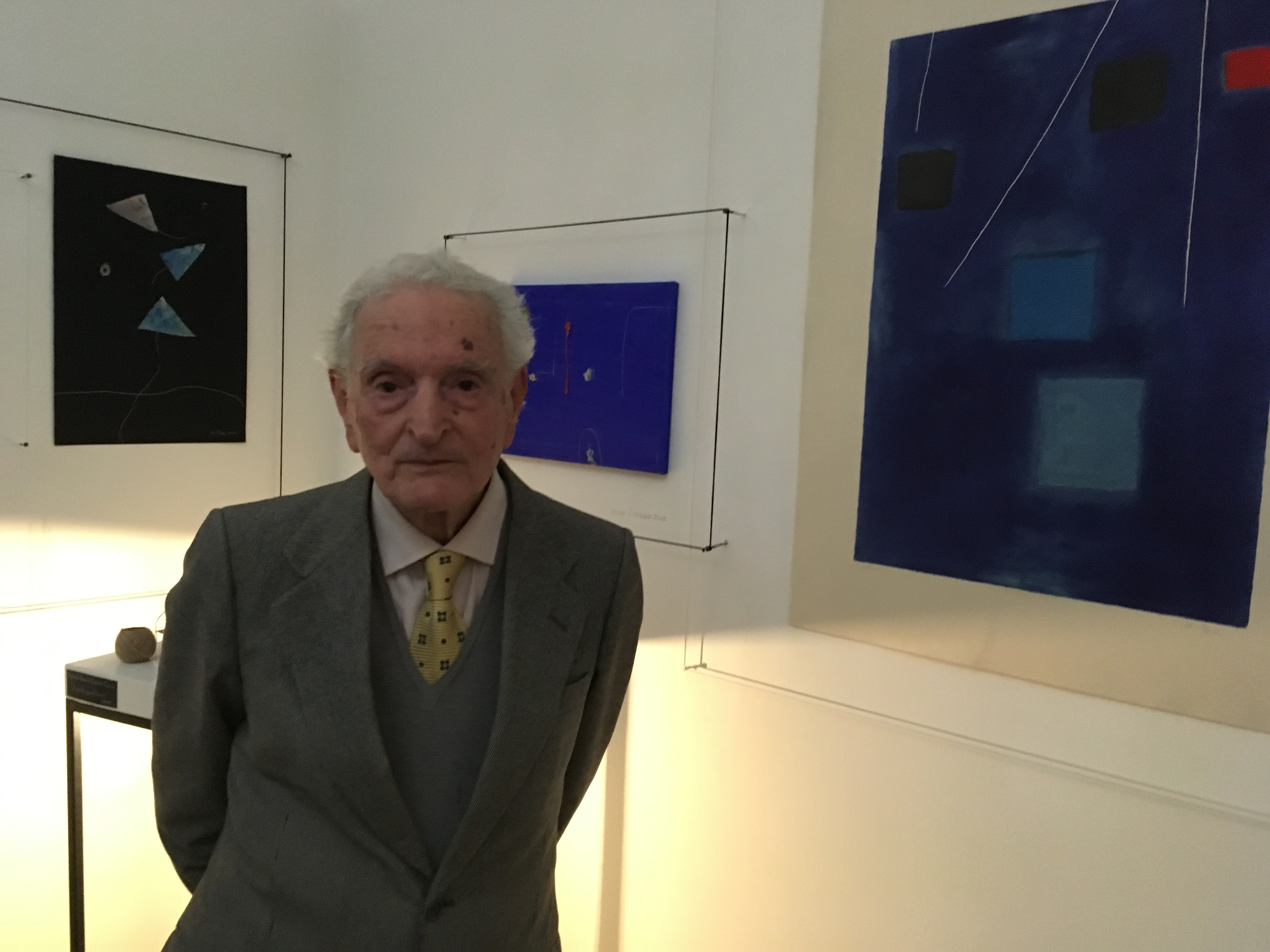
- Born: 1 June 1923; Termoli, Italy
- Died: 28 September 2021 (aged 98); Rome, Italy
- Occupation: Painter

Achille Pace (1 June 1923 – 28 September 2021) was an Italian painter. His work is held in the collection of the Galleria Nazionale d'Arte Moderna in Rome.
