= Idaho State Veterans Cemetery =

Military cemetery in Boise, Idaho, US

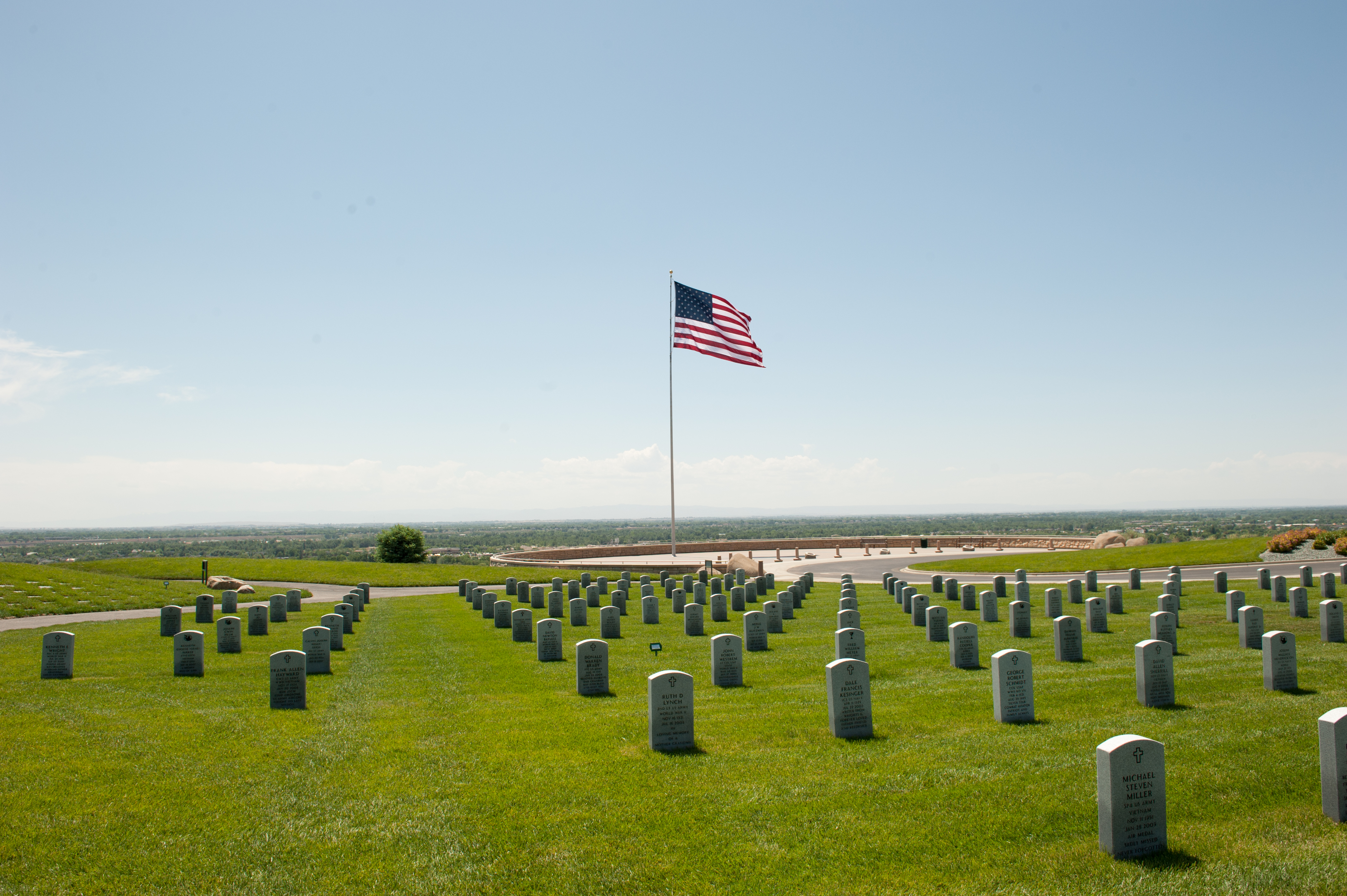
- The cemetery in June 2014
- Interactive map of Idaho State Veterans Cemetery

Details
- Established: 2004; 22 years ago
- Location: Boise, Idaho
- Country: United States
- Coordinates: 43°41′49″N 116°18′22″W
- Type: State
- Size: 76.5 acres (31.0 ha)
- Website: veterans.idaho.gov/cemeteries/boise-cemetery/
- Find a Grave: Idaho State Veterans Cemetery

The Idaho State Veterans Cemetery is a 76.5-acre (31.0 ha) military cemetery in Boise, Idaho. It opened in 2004, making Idaho the last state to build a veterans cemetery.

== History ==
In 2004, the cemetery opened as the first veterans cemetery in Idaho, which was the last state to build one. The 76.5-acre (31.0 ha) project cost $8.2 million (equivalent to $13.7 million in 2024), which the federal government paid.

The cemetery's first internment was soldier Brandon Titus, who was killed in action in the Iraq War in 2004. He received the Bronze Star and Purple Heart.

=== Discrimination criticism ===
In 2014, the cemetery faced criticism for not allowing lesbian veteran Madelynn Taylor to plan for her cremated remains to be buried with those of her deceased wife, Jean Mixner, who died in 2012. Idaho governor Butch Otter released a statement that the cemetery required a valid marriage certificate and that Idaho did not recognize same-sex marriage. After Idaho's ban on same-sex marriage was lifted on October 15, 2014, Taylor was awarded $70,000 in legal fees (equivalent to $93,000 in 2024) from the state's Constitutional Defense Fund. In July 2015, a judge ordered Taylor's ashes would be buried with Mixner's upon death.

=== Statue by Benjamin Victor ===
As part of a Memorial Day ceremony on May 29, 2021, I will have your back always..., a bronze statue by Benjamin Victor, was unveiled at the cemetery. This event was postponed from November 2020 due to the COVID-19 pandemic. The statue depicts two soldiers, with a male soldier resting on his knees holding dog tags and a female soldier holding her hand on his back. The woman is intended to portray a sense of readiness and protection while the man mourns.
