= I will have your back always... =

Statue in Boise, Idaho, U.S.

- The statue at its dedication ceremony in 2021
- Artist: Benjamin Victor
- Year: 2021
- Medium: Bronze
- Location: Boise, Idaho, U.S.
- 43°41′49″N 116°18′11″W

I will have your back always... is a bronze statue by Benjamin Victor, installed in 2021 at the Idaho State Veterans Cemetery in Boise, Idaho.

== Design ==
This bronze sculpture depicts two soldiers, with a male soldier resting on his knees holding dog tags and a female soldier holding her hand on his back. The woman is intended to portray a sense of readiness and protection while the man mourns. The man wears a Vietnam War uniform and the woman wears a Gulf War uniform. Each statue contains a bronze heart filled with soil from battlefields American soldiers fought on.

== Dedication ceremony ==
According to Dirk Kempthorne, former governor of Idaho, Victor's statue is intended to symbolize respect for American soldiers, past and present. Additionally, Kempthorne emphasized the significance of combining both male and female soldiers in the design.

The statue was originally meant to be dedicated at the Idaho State Veterans Cemetery in November 2020, but the ceremony was postponed due to the COVID-19 pandemic. It was finally unveiled as part of a Memorial Day ceremony on May 29, 2021.
