= Diego and I =

1949 painting by Frida Kahlo

- Artist: Frida Kahlo
- Year: 1949
- Medium: Oil on canvas
- Movement: Naïve art; Surrealism
- Dimensions: 30 cm × 22.4 cm (12 in × 8.8 in)
- Location: Private collection

Diego and I (Spanish: Diego y yo) is an oil on canvas painting by the Mexican artist Frida Kahlo, from 1949.

In November 2021, it sold at auction in Sotheby's New York for US$34.9 million, a record at the time for a Kahlo work, and for a work by a Latin American artist. It shattered the record previously held by the painting The Rivals (1931) by her husband Diego Rivera (1886-1957) who appears on her forehead in this work.

It is the last fully realized "bust" self-portrait Kahlo completed before her death in 1954.

The purchaser was Eduardo Costantini, the founder of MALBA, the Museum of Latin American Art of Buenos Aires, who bought it for his private collection. The painting had previously sold at Sotheby's in 1990 for $1.4 million.

== See also ==
- List of paintings by Frida Kahlo
