= Andy Edwards (sculptor) =

British sculptor (born 1964)

Andrew Edwards, known as Andy Edwards (born 1964 in Blurton, Stoke-on-Trent) is a British sculptor.

His notable works include:

- The Fine Lady (2005) in Banbury, created working with Julian Jeffery and Carl Payne as ArtCycle and with sculptor Denise Dutton, who worked on the horse
- A statue of Brian Clough and Peter Taylor (2010) at Pride Park, the ground of Derby County F.C.
- All Together Now (2014) commemorating the 1914 Christmas truce of World War I; a resin cast was displayed in Liverpool in 2014 for the centenary of the truce and a quarter sized version cast in bronze for St George's Park National Football Centre, and there are plans to erect full sized bronzes in Mesen (the Belgian town nearest the site of the truce), Germany and Britain.
- Statue of Frederick Douglass (2014) at College Park, Maryland
- The Beatles Statue (2015) on the Pier Head, Liverpool
- Buzzard (2016), Honey Bee (2016) and Hare (2018) in Newcastle-under-Lyme
- Statue of the Bee Gees (2021) in Douglas, Isle of Man
- Statue of Bob Marley (2021) in Liverpool
- Statue of Sir Alex Ferguson at Pittodrie Stadium, Aberdeen (2022)
- Statue of Lemmy (2025), on Market Place, Burslem, Staffordshire.
Some of Edwards' statues

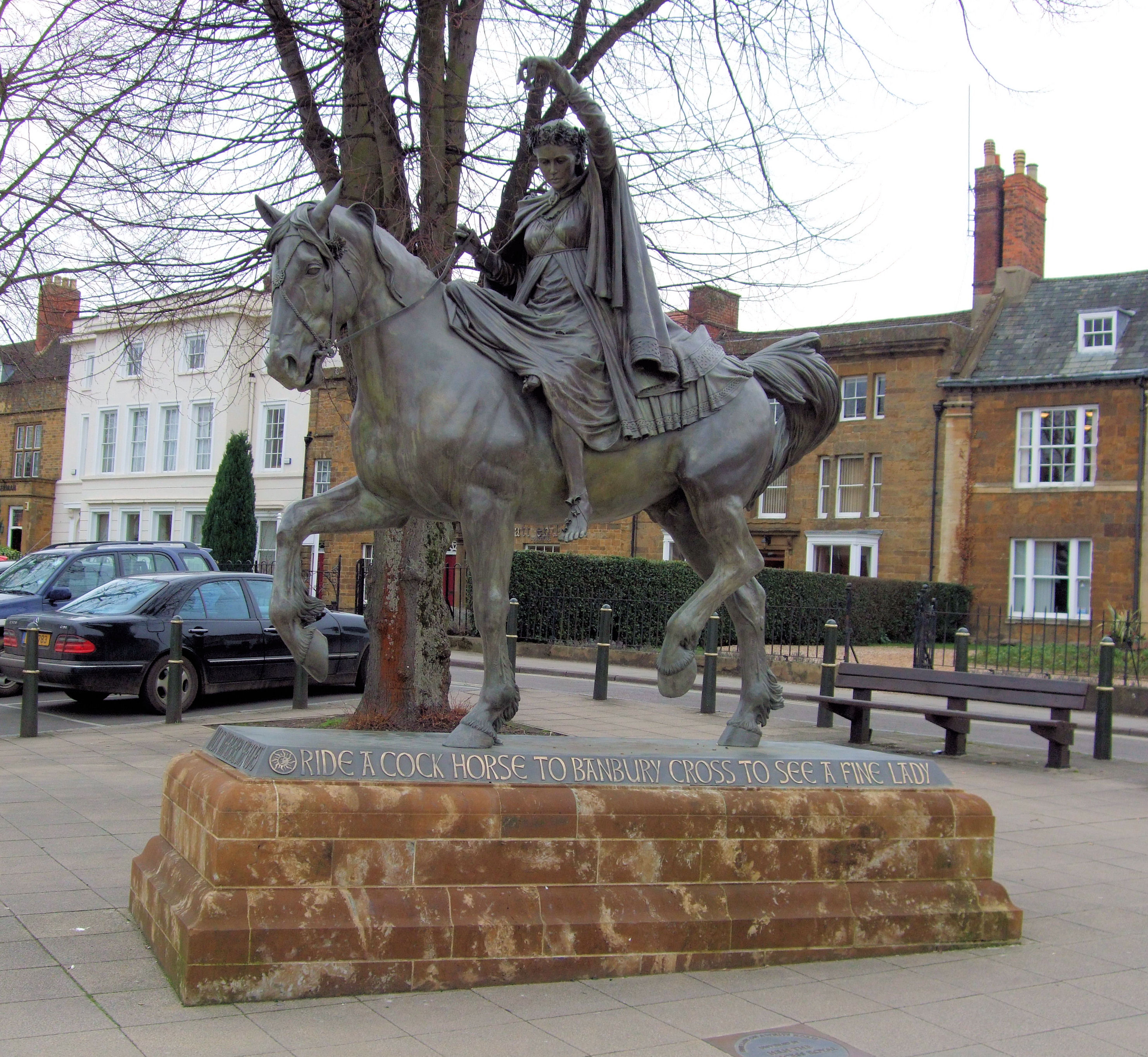
The Fine Lady, Banbury (2005)

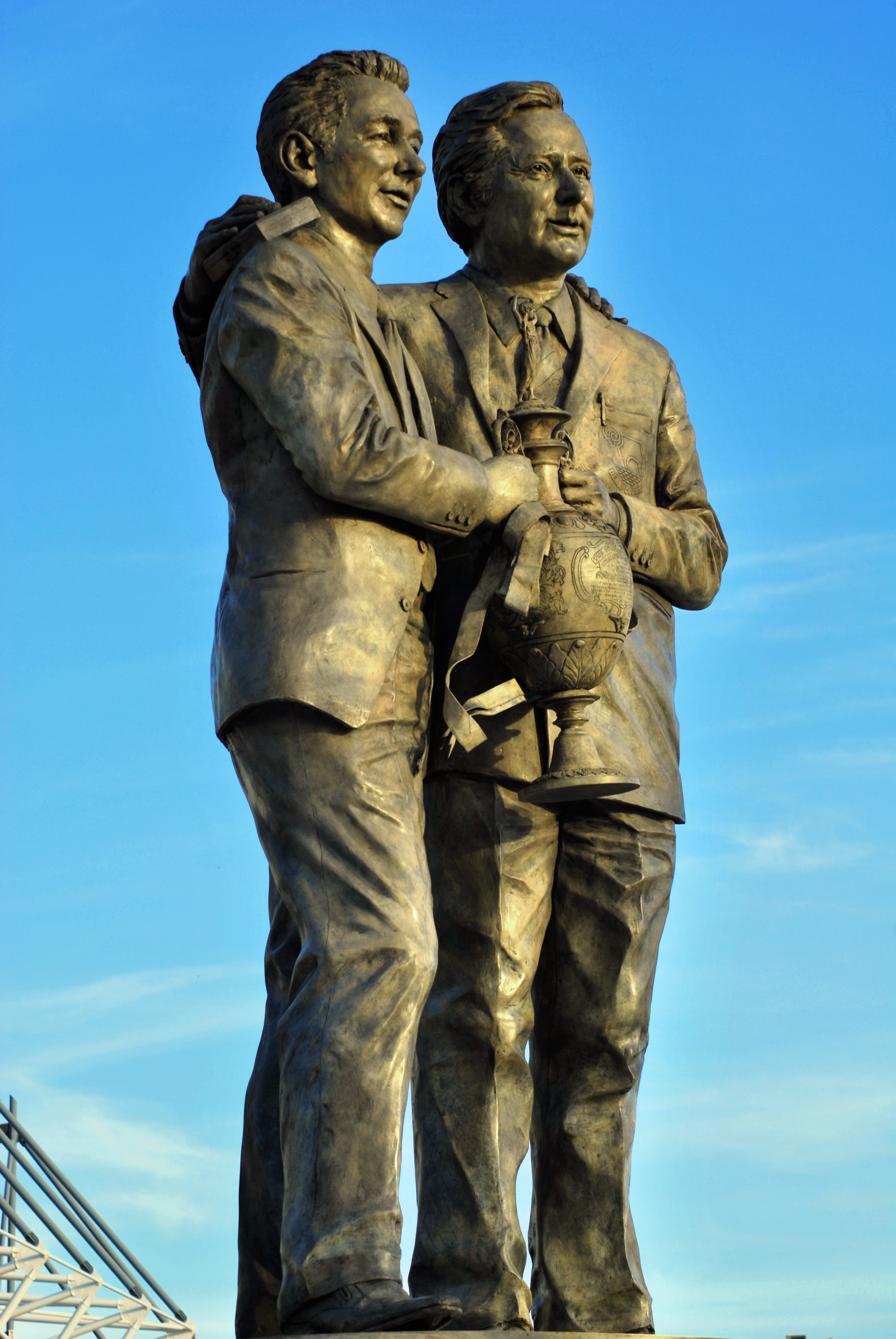
Brian Clough and Peter Taylor (2010)

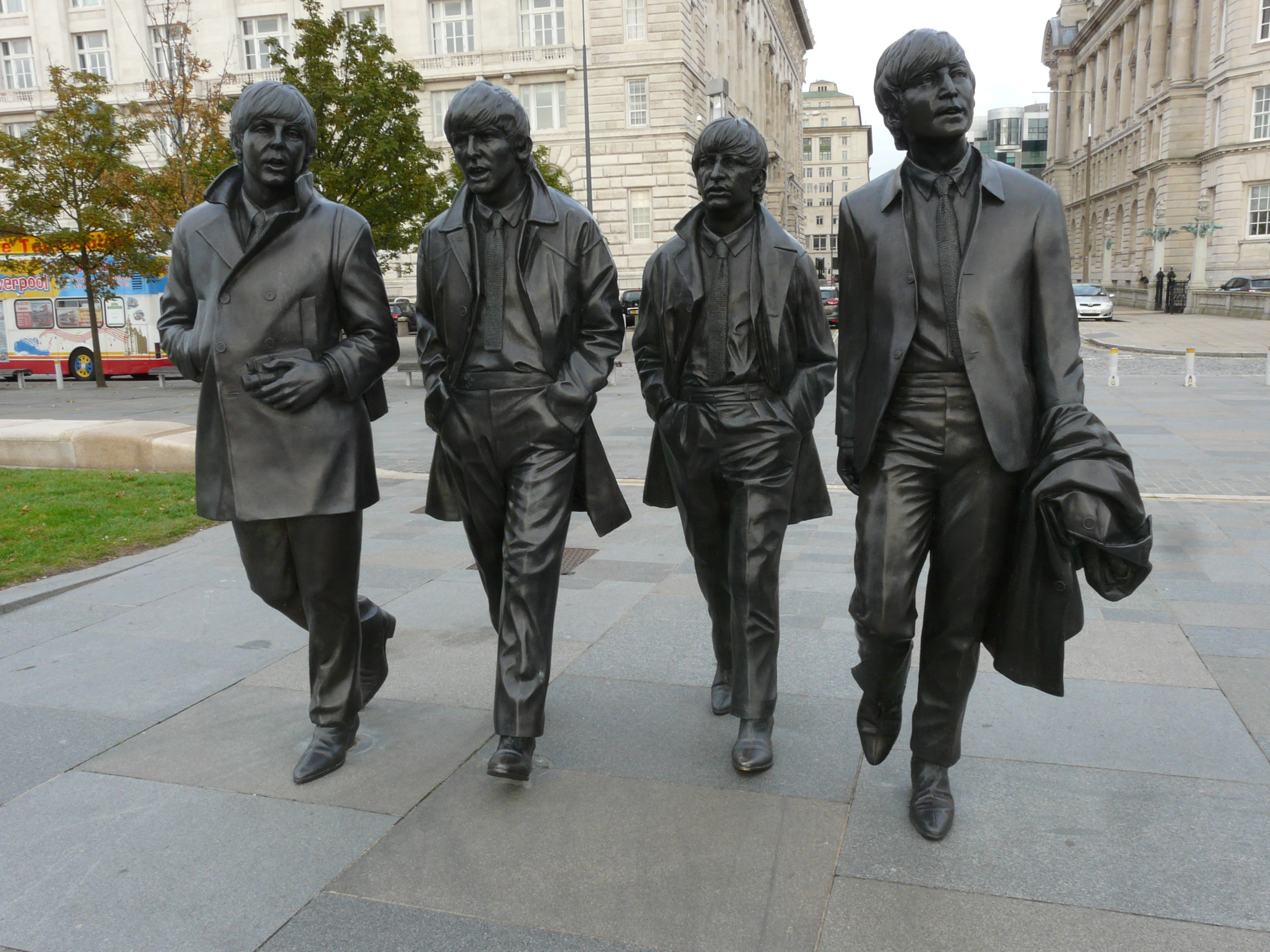
The Beatles Statue (2015)

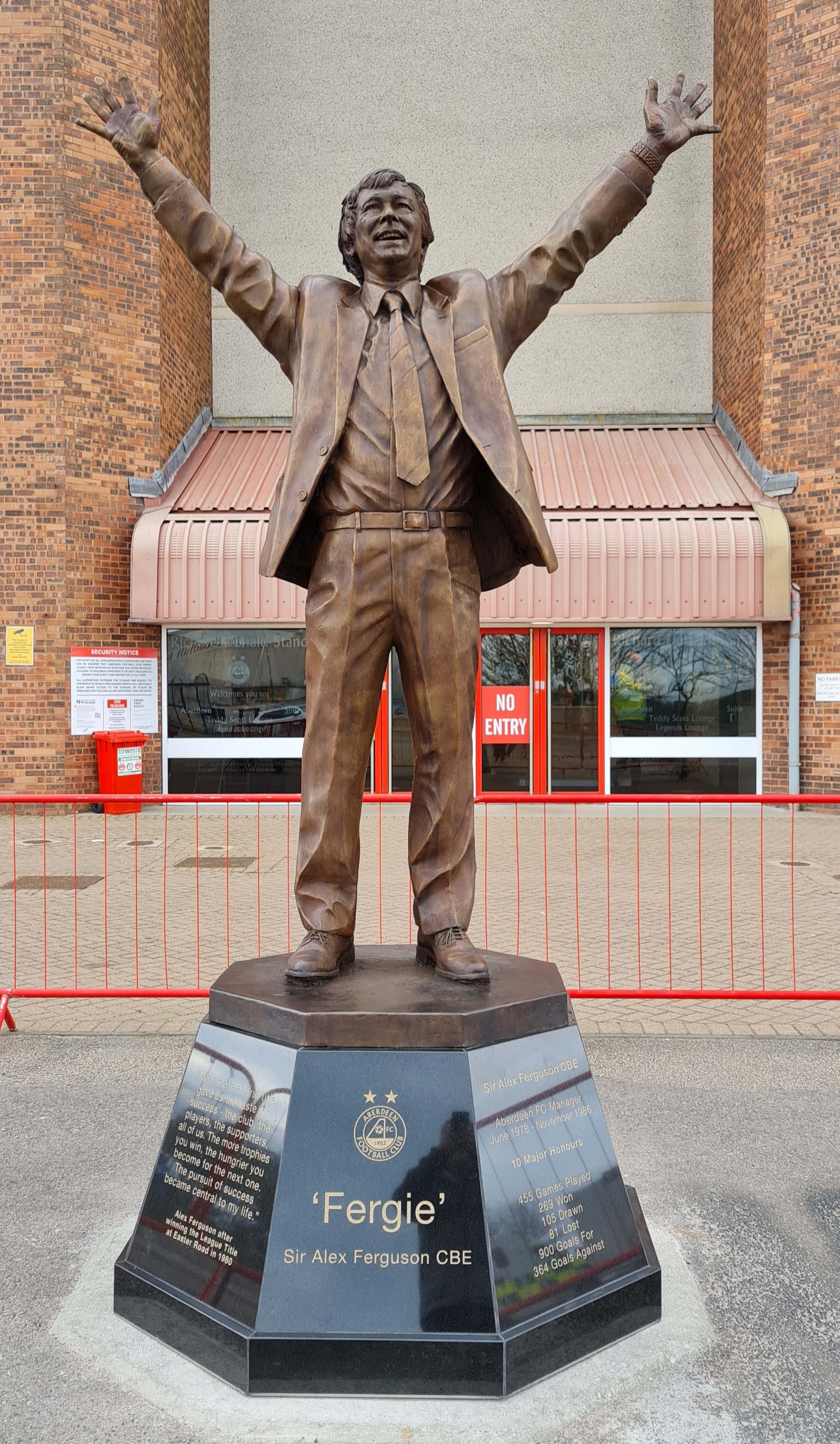
Statue of Sir Alex Ferguson 2022
