= Furio Rinaldi =

Italian art historian and curator

Furio Rinaldi is an Italian art historian and curator, who is currently the curator of drawings and prints at the Achenbach Foundation for Graphic Arts at the Fine Arts Museums of San Francisco. He is the curator of the first exhibition devoted to the drawings of the renaissance master Sandro Botticelli and the principal author of the accompanying book published by Yale University Press.

Rinaldi is also the author of Color into Line: Pastels from the Renaissance to the Present (Schiffer Publishing 2021), which accompanied the exhibition of the same name, which he oversaw at the FAMSF and was on view from October 9, 2021 to February 13, 2022. The Botticelli drawing book was chosen as the best art book of the year by art and culture critic Jason Farago in the New York Times.

From September 2022 until December 2023 he was the David and Julie Tobey Fellow at I Tatti (The Harvard Center for Italian Renaissance Studies) with a focus on the drawings of Botticelli. Rinaldi has detailed three previously unattributed Botticelli drawings.

Rinaldi tjen curated Tamara de Lempicka at the De Young Museum, which is the first major U.S. museum retrospective of the Polish art-deco artist's work. After leaving San Feancisco the exhibition traveled to the Museum of Fine Arts Houston.
