= Forrest Moses =

American abstract landscape painter (1934–2021)

Forrest Moses (1934 – January 22, 2021) was an American abstract landscape painter.

== Biography ==
Forrest Moses was born in 1934, in Danville, Virginia. He received his Bachelor of Arts degree, major in fine arts, from Washington and Lee University in Lexington, Virginia in 1956 before joining the Navy. While in the service, Moses was stationed in the Philippines and had the opportunity to visit Japan, Guam, and Hong Kong. After leaving the navy, Moses spent a year traveling through Europe and experiencing the 'art of history.'

Upon returning to the United States, Moses enrolled in the Pratt Institute in Brooklyn, where he studied architecture and design. The contemporary art scene of New York proved fascinating to Moses, and he became enthralled with the liveliness of the ever-evolving art world. It was during this time that Moses began painting and drawing in earnest.

In the early 1960s, Moses moved to Houston and worked as an architect before traveling further West to California. He lived and worked in San Francisco for a number of years while pursuing his painting career.

After another brief stint in Houston, Moses moved to Santa Fe, New Mexico, in 1969. Enchanted by the light and landscape, Moses lived and worked in Santa Fe.

== Artistic style ==
Focusing predominantly on landscapes, Moses incorporated a high degree of abstraction in his technique, but refused to fully abandon representational painting. Profoundly influenced by his time in Asia, Moses incorporated Japanese aesthetics into his work.
