= Julie L. Green =

American visual artist (1961–2021)

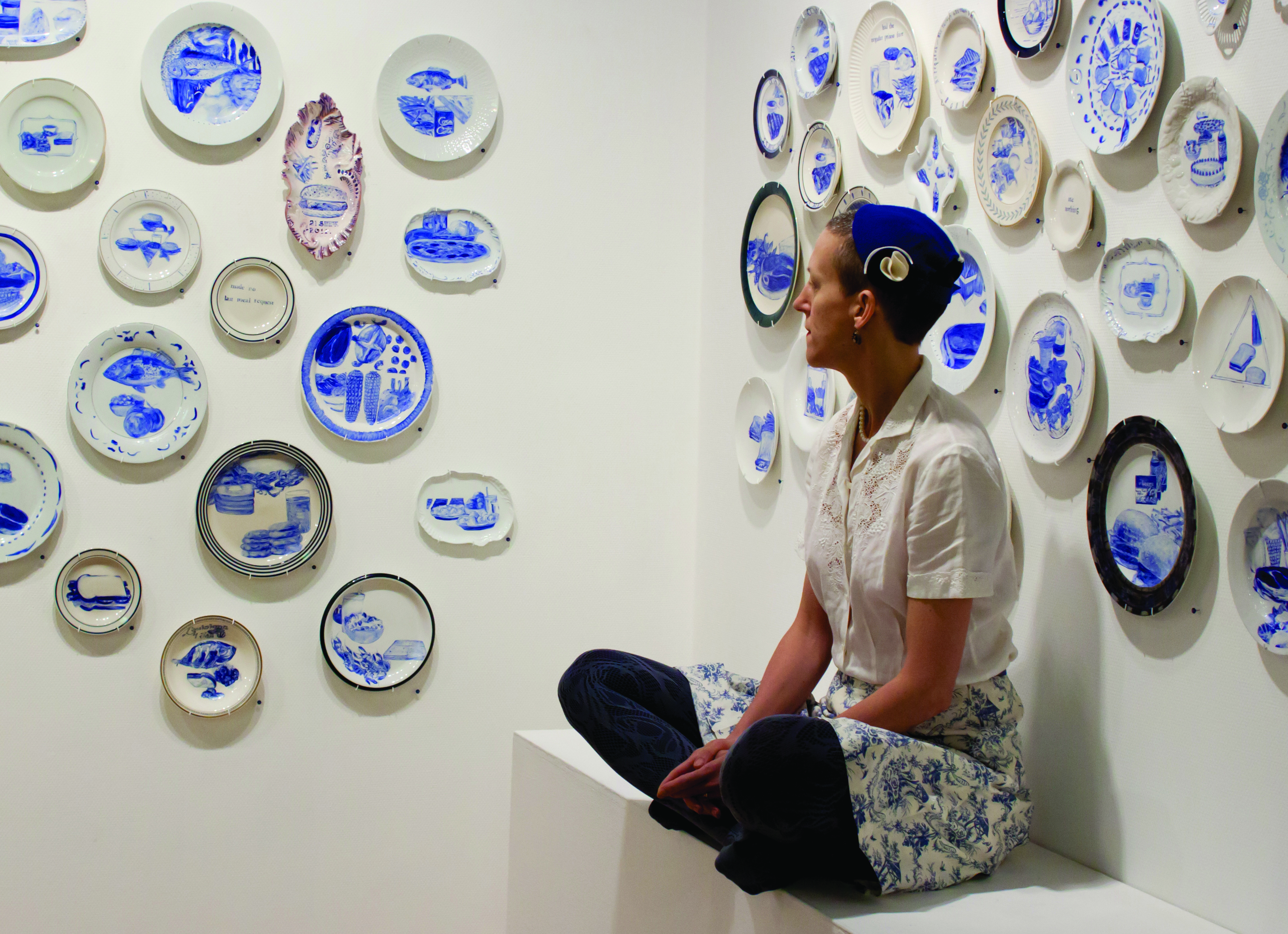
- The Last Supper
- Born: 1961; Yokosuka, Japan
- Died: 12 October 2021 (aged 60)
- Education: The University of Kansas
- Occupation: Artist
- Spouse: Clay Lohmann

Julie Lynn Green (22 September 1961 – 12 October 2021) was an American artist known for making paintings about food, fashion, and capital punishment. They spent half of each year on their work, The Last Supper, a series of 1000 plates, illustrating final meals of U.S. death row inmates.

== Early life and education ==
Julie Lynn Green was born in Yokosuka on 22 September 1961. In 1983 they earned a bachelor of fine arts in graphic design and master of fine arts in 1996 from The University of Kansas in Lawrence.

Green was a professor at Oregon State University and married artist Clay Lohmann.

== Career ==
Green's series, The Last Supper, was a series of blue glazed ceramic plates which documented the last meal of death row prisoners. They intended on creating these until death row was abolished or after 1,000 plates were created, whichever came first. They were first inspired when seeing what a condemned person was served in newspapers and humanized the experiences of those individuals through their meals.

After previously focusing on the last meals of death row inmates, Green released a series of paintings and documents relating to death row prisoners' first meals after exoneration. The series was done with the help of Northwestern University’s Pritzker School of Law’s Center on Wrongful Convictions.

Green's solo exhibitions included "The Last Supper" at Bellevue Museum of Art, Texas State University. Their work has been featured in Oregon Artswatch, Ceramics Monthly and other publications. The Last Supper book, published by The Arts Center, Corvallis, OR, includes images of 500 plates.

== Works ==
=== Last Supper ===
“Last Supper” is a large-scale installation of 1000 plates painted with images of food and words in cobalt blue that depict the final meal requests of the U.S. Death Row Inmates. Julie has their own understanding of food: "Food is sustenance, food is community, food is sharing ideas with friends and family, it’s a celebration, it's joy, and even if it's eaten alone, it’s still a ritual." Green also lists the date of the execution and the state where it happened. For the plate “New Mexico 06 November 2001”, Julie paints seven shrimps and an ice-cream on a dessert plate. The artworks to emphasize the humanity of those condemned prisoners and is a call to end capital punishment one day in the U.S. Green planned to continue working on “Last Supper” until capital punishment is abolished. However, they ended this series after completing 1000 plates after they were diagnosed with ovarian cancer.

=== First Meal ===
“First Meal” is a companion series of “Last Supper” that consists of 30 artworks. Instead of using plates, Green paints with acrylic on Tyvek. The series lasted three years until their death. To accomplish this series, they asked wrongfully convicted persons about what they ate for their first meal after they were released from prison. For one former prisoner, he chose a burger and fries from Burger King. Below the image of the meal, a sentence was written: “17 years on death row, 1st meal on the outside, then threw up”. Green’s work is helping those innocent people to gain attention for how they were falsely treated. Meanwhile, they are reminding people about the imperfection of our current justice system.. Chadd Scott wrote down in his article: "Examples like this demonstrate how the seemingly more hopeful nature of First Meal artworks can, in fact, be more heartbreaking than the stories shared in The Last Supper. Years, in some cases decades, stolen from innocent people, the prime of their lives spent locked away by a criminal justice system still rife with prejudice and inequity."

== Death and legacy ==
Following Green's 1,000th plate for their decades-long art project, The Last Supper, they died on 12 October 2021, in Corvallis, Oregon, by physician-assisted suicide under Oregon's Death with Dignity Act. They had ovarian cancer.

== Awards ==
A recipient of the Joan Mitchell Foundation Painters and Sculptors Grant, Green won the 2015 ArtPrize 3-D Juried Award and a 2016 Oregon Arts Commission Fellow. Green was a 2017 Hallie Ford Fellow through The Ford Family Foundation.
