= Robert Fiske =

Robert Fiske may refer to:

- Robert Fiske (actor) (1889–1944), American film actor
- Robert B. Fiske (1930–2025), American lawyer and Whitewater special prosecutor
- Robert Hartwell Fiske (1948–2016), writer, editor, and publisher of The Vocabula Review

== See also ==
- Robert Fiske Bradford (1902–1983), American politician
- Robert Fiske Griggs (1881–1962), American botanist and ecologist
- Robert Fisk (1946–2020), British journalist
- Robert Farris Fisk (1819–1863), American lawyer and librarian
