= Minnesota Judicial Center =

- Minnesota Historical Society Building
- U.S. National Register of Historic Places
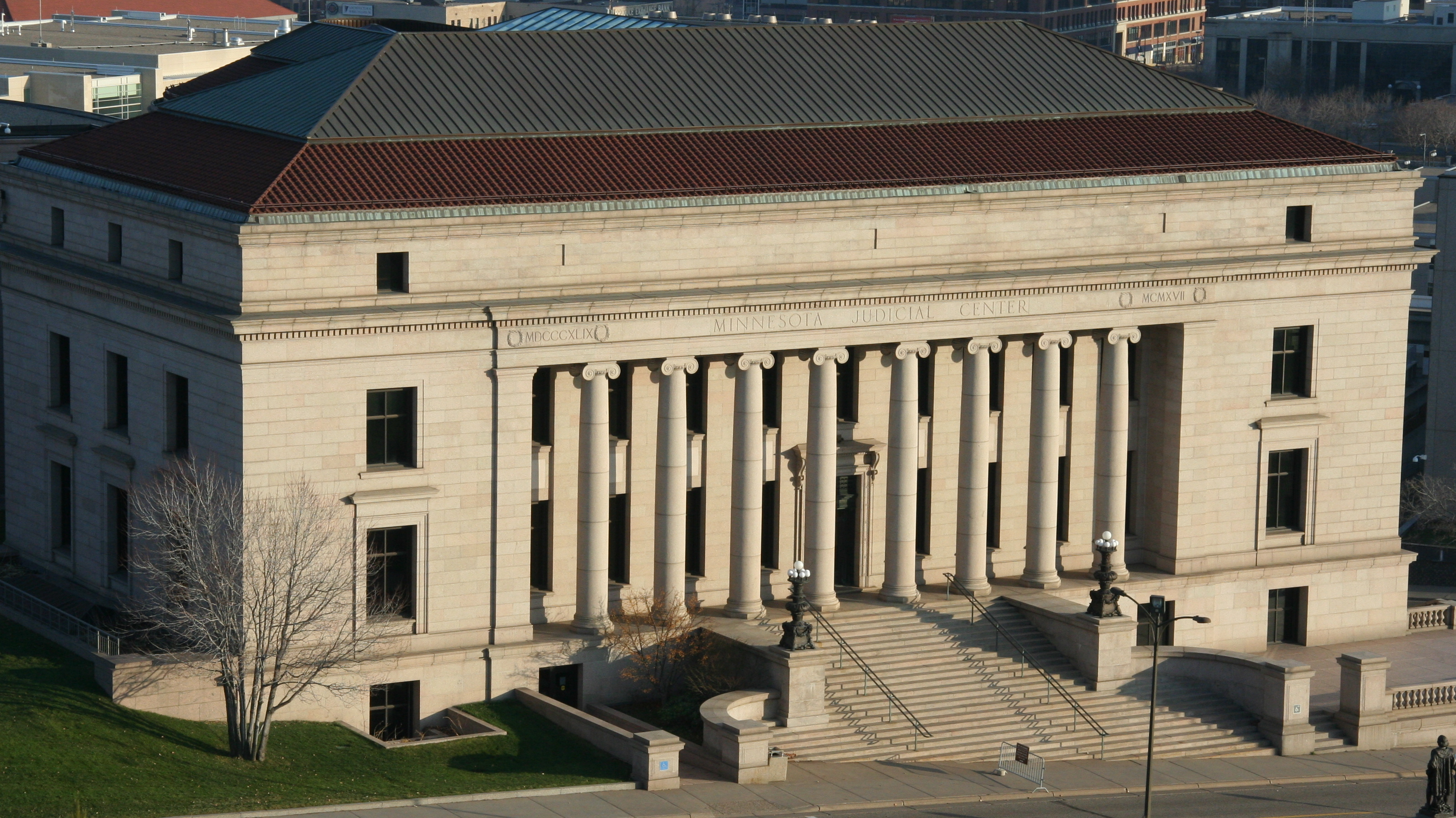
- The Minnesota Judicial Center seen from the roof of the State Capitol

- Location within Minnesota Location within the United States
- Interactive map showing the location of Minnesota Judicial Center
- Location: 690 Cedar Street; Saint Paul, Minnesota
- Coordinates: 44°57′17″N 93°6′0″W
- Built: 1915
- Architect: Clarence H. Johnston, Sr.
- NRHP reference No.: 73000994
- Added to NRHP: March 20, 1973

The Minnesota Judicial Center, adjacent to the State Capitol, houses the state's Supreme Court and Court of Appeals, as well as the Workers' Compensation Court of Appeals and the state law library. Its address is 25 Rev. Dr. Martin Luther King, Jr., Blvd., Saint Paul, Minnesota, United States.

The building was constructed on the former site of the Mechanic Arts High School, which was demolished in 1914 for further development of the state capitol. It is listed on the National Register of Historic Places as the Minnesota Historical Society Building, as it was built for that institution. In 1992, the society moved to a new building nearby, the Minnesota History Center.

The neoclassical front of the building has eight two-story Ionic columns of granite. Above them are Roman numerals representing the establishment of the Minnesota Historical Society in 1849 and the year the building was completed, 1917. It was dedicated on May 11, 1918, the sixtieth anniversary of statehood.

== See also ==
- National Register of Historic Places listings in Ramsey County, Minnesota
