= Robert Farris Fisk =

American lawyer

- Born: May 5, 1819
- Died: December 16, 1863 (aged 44)
- Occupations: Attorney and Librarian
- Known for: State Librarian of Minnesota

Robert Farris Fisk (May 5, 1819 – December 16, 1863) was an American lawyer and librarian. He was the third son of Deacon William, and Jane (Farris) Fisk, and was born in Cambridge, Massachusetts.

After a course of study fitting him for commercial life, he entered the counting-room of an India merchant in Boston, and remained there three or four years, subsequently making a voyage to the West Indies. An irresistible desire for a college education, and the partial failure of his health, led him to change his course of life. He graduated from Yale College in 1844 and Harvard Law School in 1846, and was admitted to the Massachusetts bar, but he did not enter upon the practice of his profession. He engaged in mercantile and manufacturing pursuits at Boston, and continued there until 1857, when he removed to St. Paul, Minnesota. From 1860 to 1863 he held the office of State Librarian of Minnesota, and then, in consequence of impaired health, he returned to the East. He died suddenly in Washington, D C, December 16, 1863, aged 44.

He was married, June 16, 1847, in New Haven, Connecticut, to Miss Narcissa P. Whittemore, step-daughter of Hon. S. J. Hitchcock. His widow and five children survived him. His brother, Dr. S. A Fisk, graduated in the same Yale class, and lived in Northampton, Massachusetts.
