= Minnesota State Law Library =

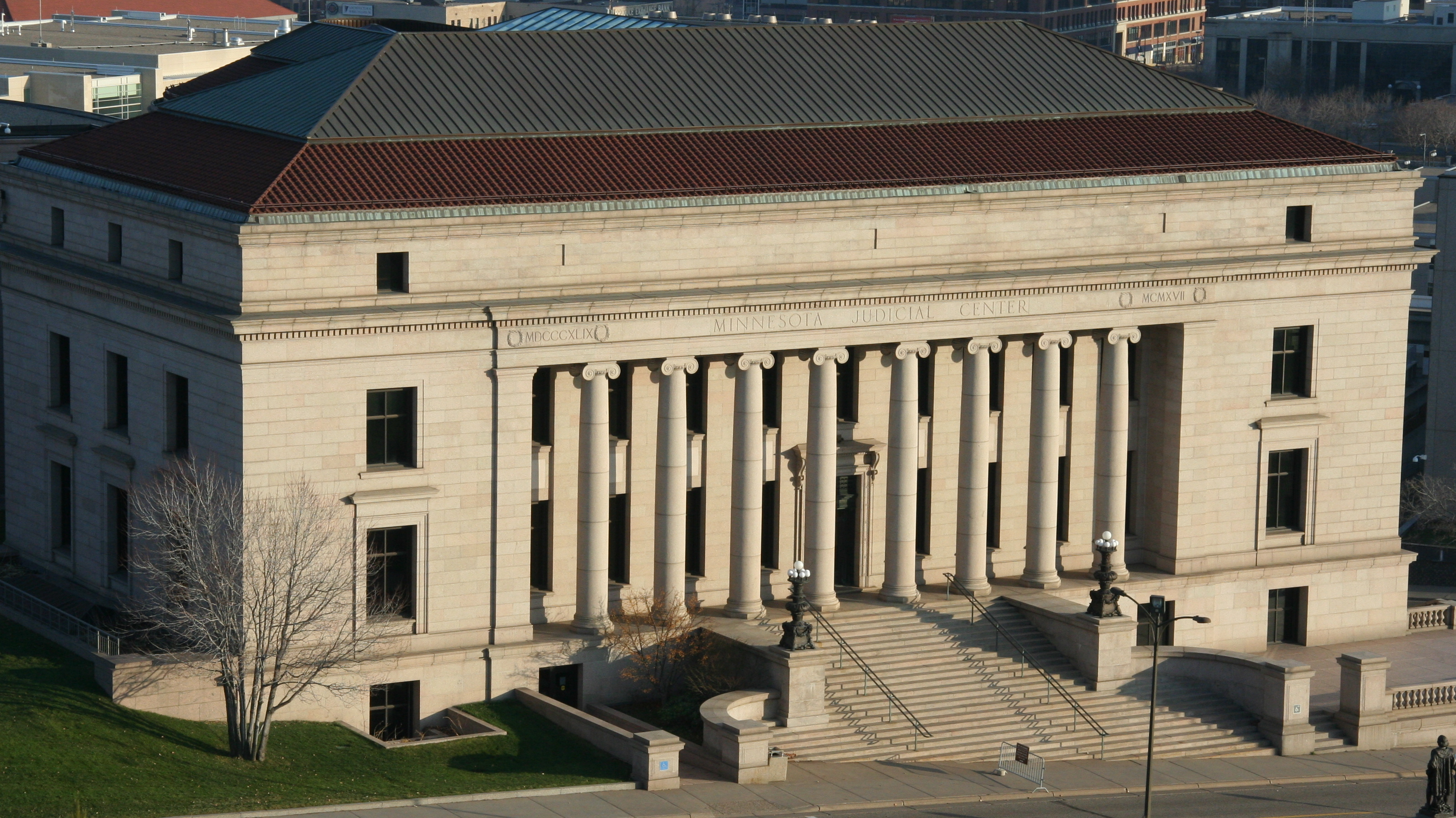
- The Minnesota Judicial Center
- 44°57′17″N 93°06′00″W
- Location: 25 Rev Dr Martin Luther King Jr Blvd; Saint Paul, Minnesota

Other information
- Website: http://www.lawlibrary.state.mn.us/

The Minnesota State Law Library is a law library operated by the judicial branch of the U.S. state of Minnesota. It is currently housed in the ground level of the Minnesota Judicial Center, which was built in 1915. An expansion of the building was completed in 1990. The Minnesota Judicial Center is adjacent to the State Capitol in St. Paul.

As cited in the Minnesota Constitution, the State Law Librarian is appointed by the Minnesota Supreme Court. In its long history, the library has benefitted from the contributions of 25 State Librarians/State Law Librarians, who have come from many walks of life. Doctors, journalists, teachers, legislators, mayors, and in recent years, attorneys have held the office. Some of the more colorful State Law Librarians have been Gen. Samuel P. Jennison, who later served in the Civil War. Louisa Goodwin, widowed by the Civil War, served as the nation's first female state librarian. Captain DeWitt Smith and Melissa Smith were the first husband and wife to hold the same state office in Minnesota. William Henry Harrison Taylor was a grandson of William Henry Harrison, the 9th President of the United States. Margaret S. Andrews was the last person to be referred to as State Librarian and the first to be called State Law Librarian.

== See also ==
- List of libraries in the United States
