= Minnesota State Capitol =

State capitol building of the U.S. state of Minnesota

- Minnesota State capitol building
- U.S. National Register of Historic Places
- Minnesota State Register of Historic Places
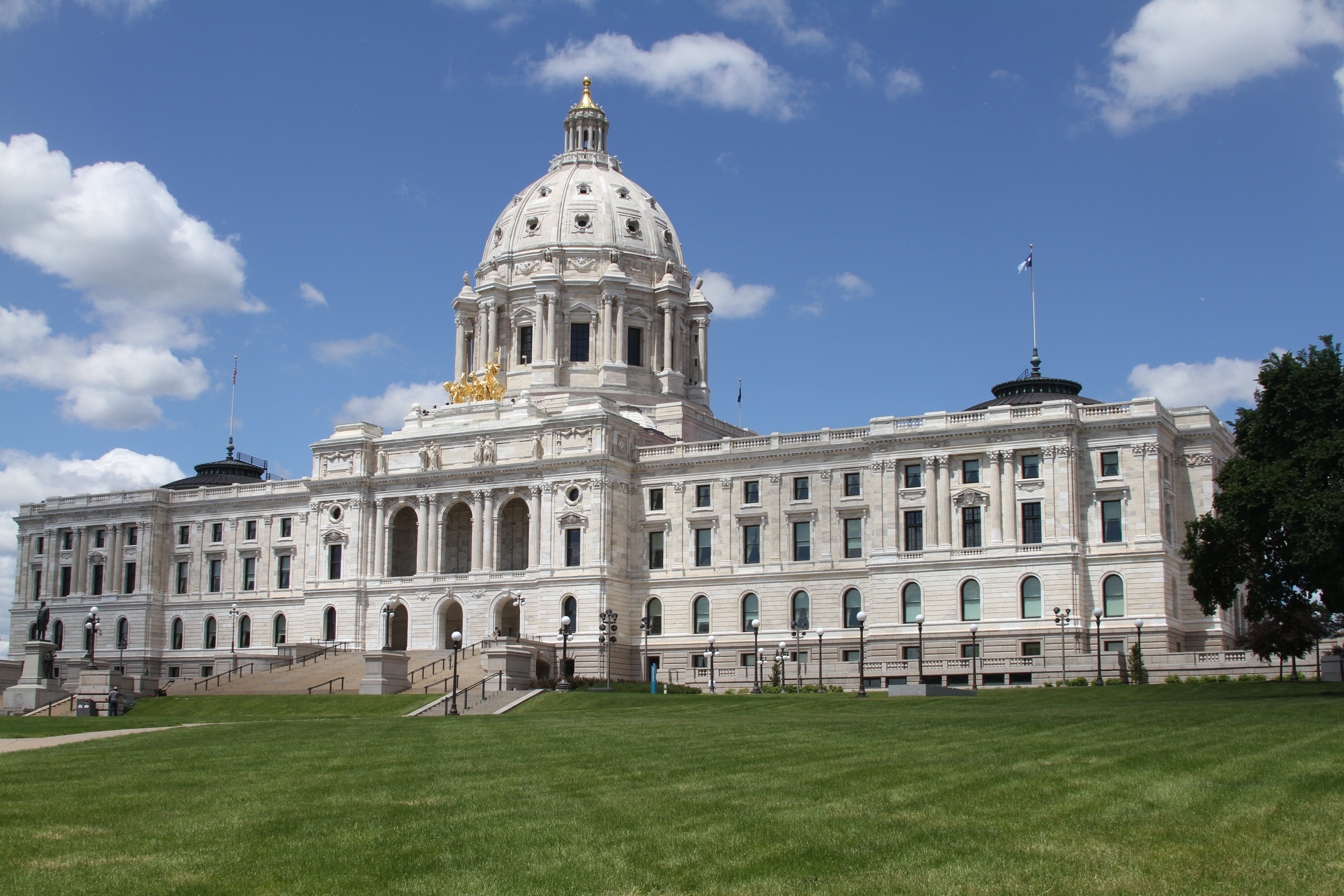
- The Minnesota State Capitol from the south

- Location within Minnesota Location within the United States
- Interactive map showing Minnesota State Capitol's location
- Location: 75 Rev. Dr. Martin Luther King, Jr. Boulevard, Saint Paul, Minnesota, 55155
- Coordinates: 44°57′19″N 93°6′8″W
- Built: 1905; 121 years ago
- Architect: Cass Gilbert
- Architectural style: Italian Renaissance, Beaux-Arts
- NRHP reference No.: 72000681

Significant dates
- Added to NRHP: February 23, 1972
- Designated State Register: 1971

The Minnesota State Capitol is the seat of government for the U.S. state of Minnesota, in its capital city of Saint Paul. It houses the Minnesota Senate, Minnesota House of Representatives, the office of the attorney general and the office of the governor. The building also includes a chamber for the Minnesota Supreme Court, although court activities also take place in the neighboring Minnesota Judicial Center.

There have been three State Capitol buildings. The present building was designed by architect Cass Gilbert and completed in 1905. Its Beaux-Arts/American Renaissance design was influenced by the 1893 World's Columbian Exposition in Chicago, and by McKim, Mead & White's Rhode Island State House. From 2013 to 2017 the building underwent an extensive restoration. This included replacing existing infrastructure; adding new mechanical systems; replacing or repairing tens of thousands of pieces of marble on the exterior; cleaning historic paintings, murals, and sculptures; and adding safety and accessibility features.

The building is set in a landscaped campus with the Capitol Mall on its south front, Leif Erikson Park on its west, and Judicial Plaza to its east. Various monuments and memorials are located in these green spaces.

== History ==
=== First Minnesota State Capitol ===
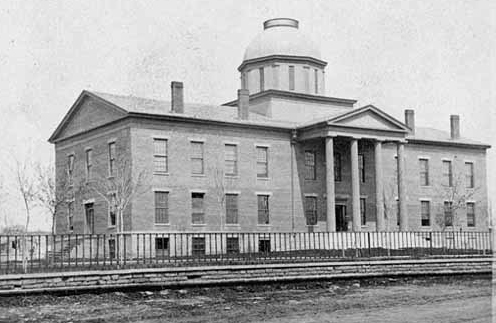
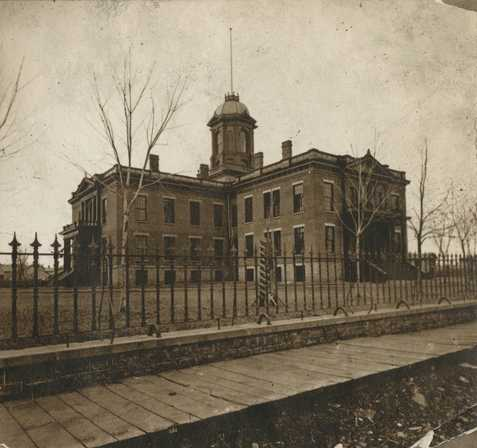
Left: Minnesota's first Capitol in 1860; Right: Expanded and remodeled, ca. 1873

The current State Capitol building is the third building to serve this purpose. The territorial legislature first met in a temporary headquarters in the Central House Hotel. In 1851, work began to oversee finances and the hiring of contractors to build the Capitol. Its architect, N. C. Prentiss drew up specifications for the new Capitol. Exterior details included brick work, cut stone floors and steps for the porches, a wood pediment, wood Ionic-style columns, and a well-framed roof covered with fireproof material. Interior work called for Norway pine flooring and staircases of oak and ash with oak handrails and turned balusters. The legislature moved into the new Capitol in time for the 5th territorial legislative session on January 4, 1854.

The population boomed after Minnesota became a state on May 11, 1858, and the Capitol building was expanded with a new wing on the Exchange Street side of the building in 1873 and a second wing facing Wabasha Street in 1878.

Despite efforts to make the Capitol fire-resistant, it was destroyed by fire on March 1, 1881. While legislators met in the evening, fire broke out in the dome of the Capitol and quickly spread. There were no deaths, but efforts to save the building failed. It was replaced on the same site in 1883 by the second Capitol building.

=== Second Minnesota State Capitol ===
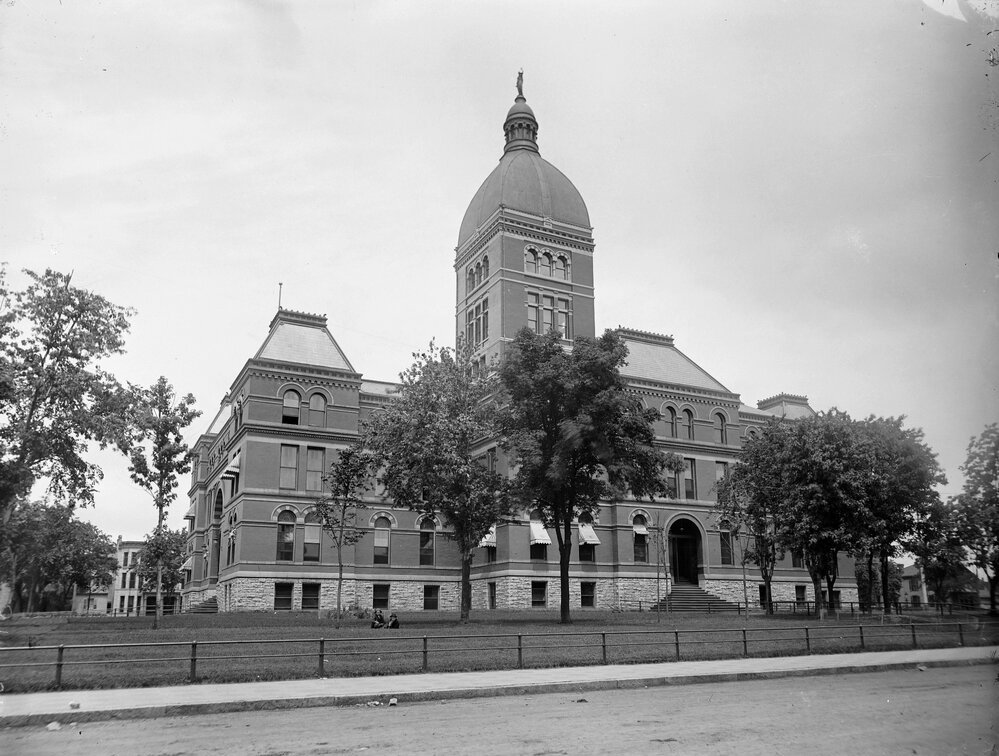
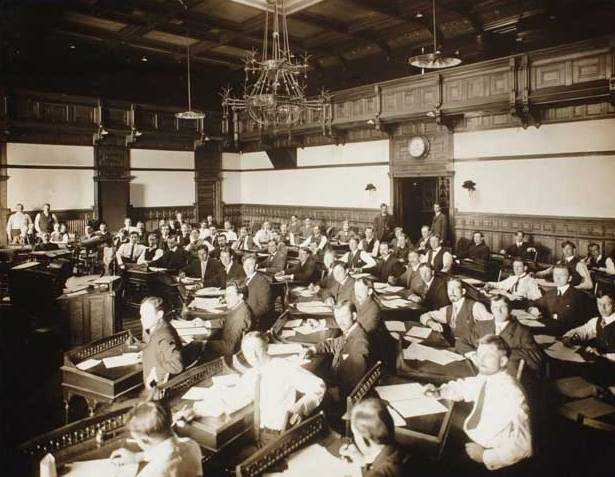
Left: Second Capitol, 1893; Right: Senate Chamber, 1900

After fire destroyed Minnesota's first Capitol building, the second Capitol, a three-story, Romanesque, masonry building designed by Leroy Buffington, was completed in 1883 on the site of the first Capitol. Buffington designed the new building in the shape of a Greek cross. It featured a foundation of cut stone and walls of red brick with Dresbach sandstone trim. Each wing measured 150 feet in length. The main entrance on the southwest from Wabasha Street opened onto the first floor, where the governor, attorney general, auditor, treasurer, and secretary of state had offices. The Assembly (House of Representatives) chamber in the southeast wing featured a twenty-five-foot ceiling with a large stained glass skylight. The Senate chamber in the southwest wing was finished in yellow birch and birdseye maple. The Supreme Court chamber in the southeast wing featured woodwork of cherry and Hungarian ash.

Shortly after it opened, deficiencies of the new building were becoming clear. Overcrowding due to a lack of space, a lack of adequate fireproofing, and the discovery of dry rot made the building increasing unacceptable. Additionally, poor ventilation led in the push for a new Capitol building in 1893. It had served as the seat of Minnesota state government for just 10 years before state officials began planning a grander, more efficient Capitol. After the completion of the third State Capitol in 1905, the state used the old Capitol for meeting space, storage, and parking until its demolition in 1937. The site for the first and second Capitol buildings eventually became home to the former Arts and Science Building and McNally Smith Music Academy.

=== Third Minnesota State Capitol ===
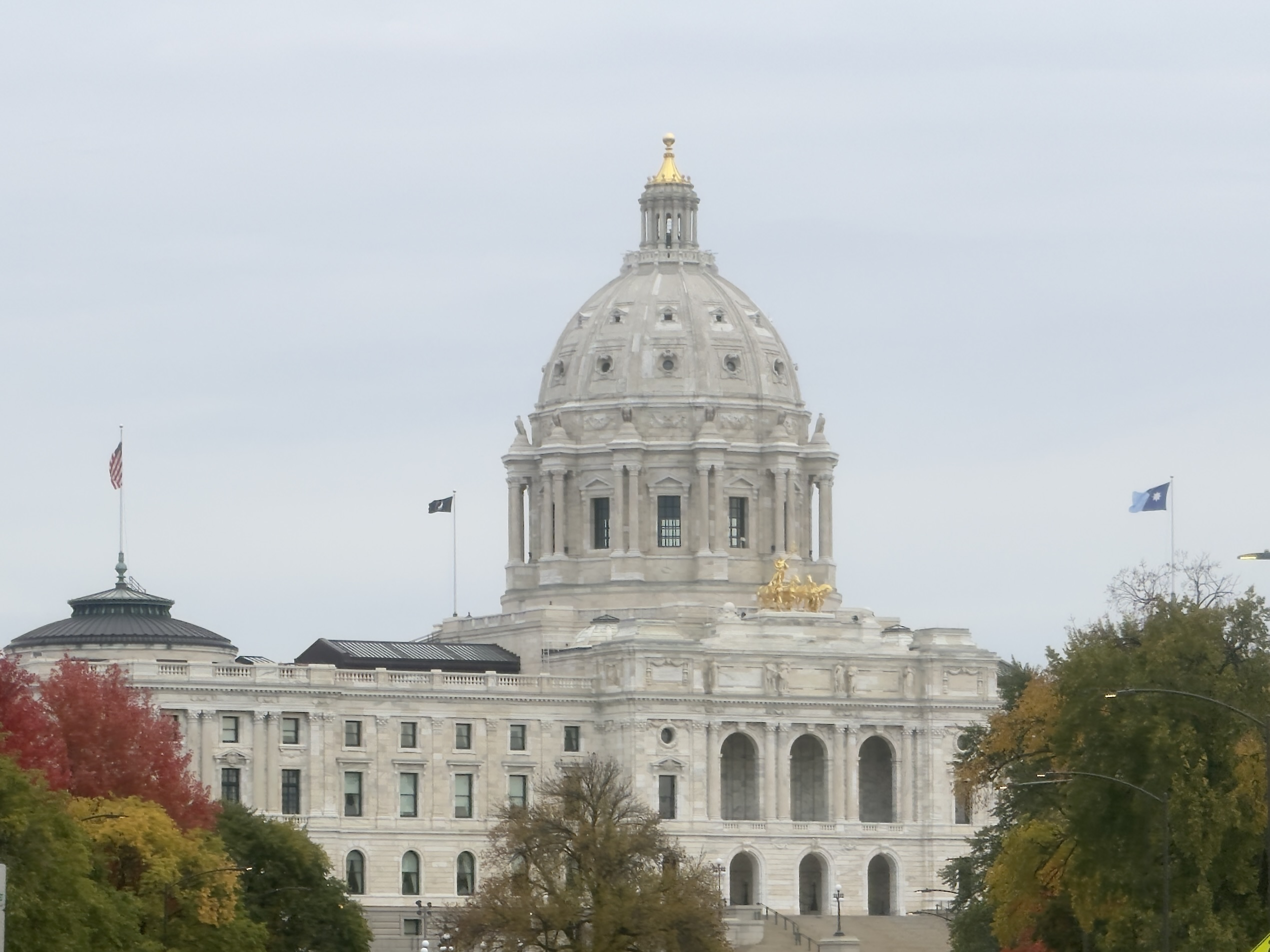
Third Capitol in 2025.

The present state Capitol was designed by Cass Gilbert, whose design was selected by the Board of State Capitol Commissioners over 41 other submissions. Butler-Ryan Construction was selected as the contractor. Work began on the capitol in 1896, its corner-stone laid July 27, 1898, and construction was completed in 1905. The construction cost US$4.5 million. It opened its doors to the public for the first time on January 2, 1905. In 1893 Governor Knute Nelson appointed the seven-member Board of State Capitol Commissioners to oversee the construction of a new Capitol following the recommendation of the state legislature. The board oversaw every aspect of the work. This included supervising the expenditures, acquiring property, setting building specifications, selecting the architect and general contractor, and giving final approval for the type of stone to use on the exterior, as well as the art and artists.

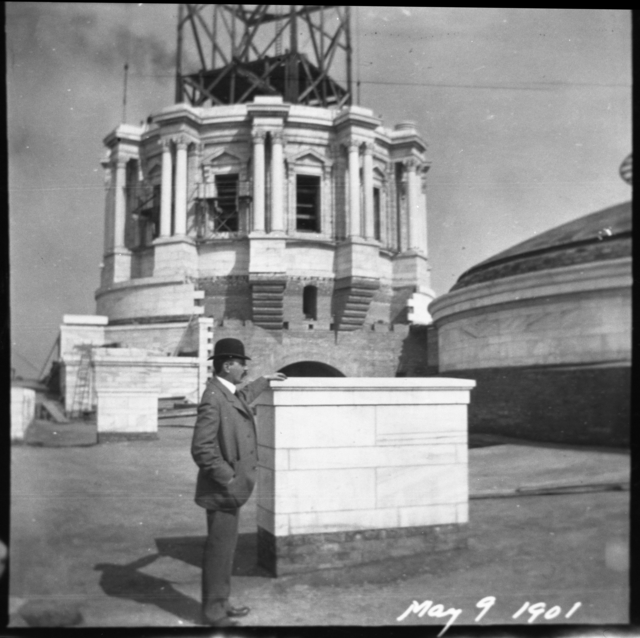
Cass Gilbert during construction of the drum in 1901, upon which the dome was built

The site selected by the commission was "Wabasha Hill", bounded by Park Avenue, University Avenue, Cedar and Wabasha Streets, and Central Avenue. While this was the costliest of the four sites considered for the Capitol, it was the largest, and the Commission concluded that it was the best location for the building. Dozens of companies and hundreds of workers worked to complete the statehouse. Six workers were killed in accidents between 1898 and 1903 as a result of unsafe working conditions.

Upon completion, the building drew praise from the architecture community, leading to requests for Gilbert to design Capitol buildings for other states, such as West Virginia and Arkansas, and other notable structures.

Originally, the Capitol housed all the executive offices and the three branches of state government, state agencies and commissions, and the Minnesota Historical Society. Expansion of offices and meeting rooms, reconstruction of chambers, and subdivision of corridors occurred as early as the 1930s. As needs expanded, the state agencies and commissions, and over half of the executive offices, moved out of the Capitol to other buildings. One of the first to leave was the Minnesota Historical Society, which relocated to its own building (now the Minnesota Judicial Center) next to the Capitol in 1915. Most recently, the offices of the Senate moved to the newly constructed Minnesota Senate Building in January 2016.

The structure was added to the National Register of Historic Places in 1972.

== Architecture ==
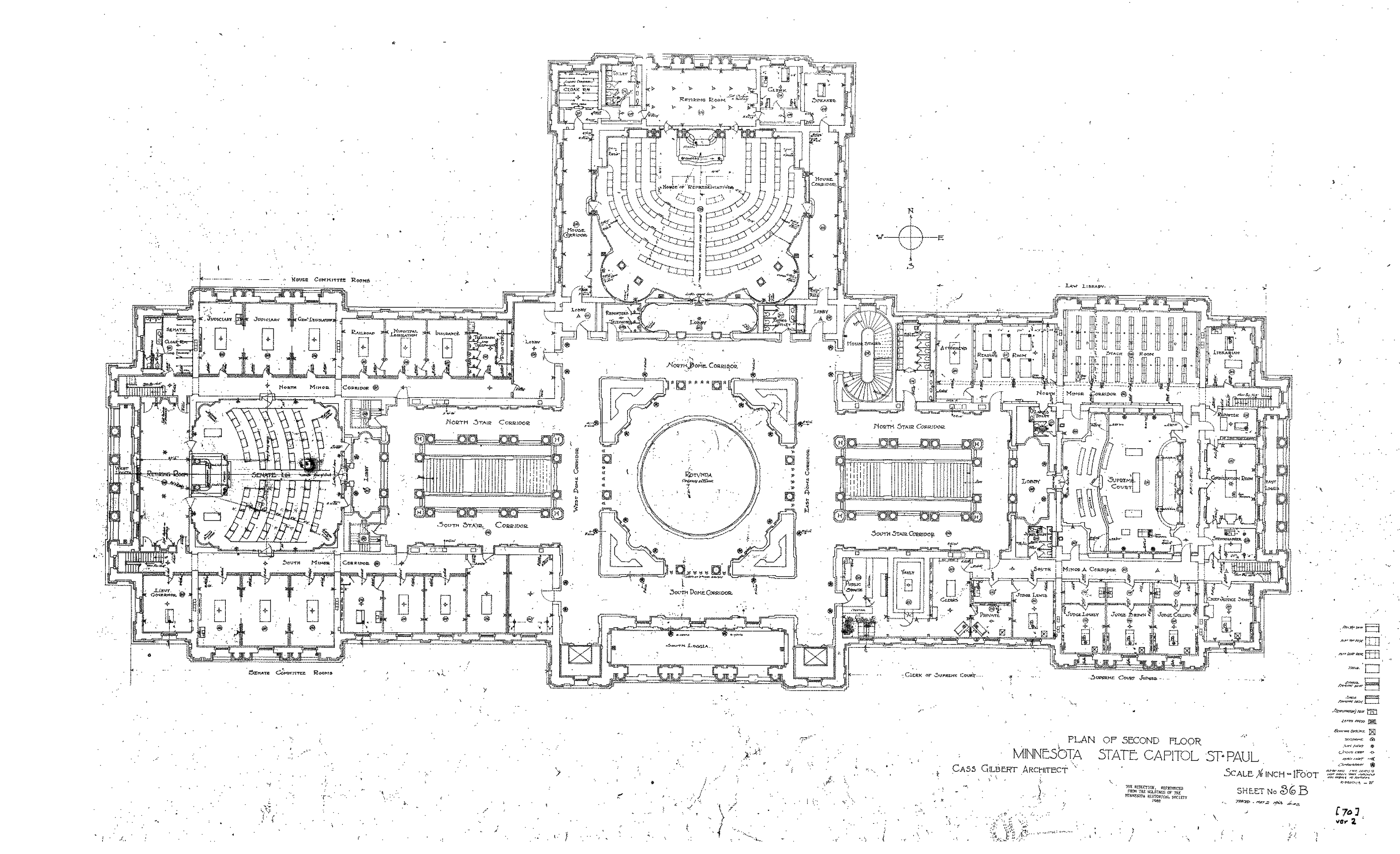
Second floor plan, ca. 1896

The Minnesota Capitol is usually described as "Beaux-Arts", a modern term not in use when the Capitol was built, but a style made popular in part by the architecture at the Chicago World's Columbian Exposition in 1893. In addition to being influenced by his time at the World's Columbian Exposition, the State Capitol's architect Cass Gilbert was inspired by McKim, Mead & White's Rhode Island State House. Gilbert wrote a note in the margins on a 1912 article on his work stating that his plan of the Minnesota capitol had been greatly influenced by the one in Rhode Island.

The building's structure consists of a steel and cast iron frame on rough limestone foundation walls resting on concrete footings. Guastavino tile vaulting forms the ceilings on both the ground and first floor. The structural elements of a building primarily consist of load-bearing brick and stone masonry walls and piers supporting steel-framed floor and roof systems. Care given in the construction of the original structure was so great that even far removed mechanical spaces not intended to be seen by the public were designed and built with a high standard of finish and design.

Building dimensions

East to west, the Capitol is more than 430 ft (130 m) long. From ground level to the top of the dome's lantern measures 220 ft (67 m). Inside, the building has more than 300,000 square feet (28,000 m^{2}) of floor space, or about 5,000,000 cubic feet (140,000 m^{3}) of space.

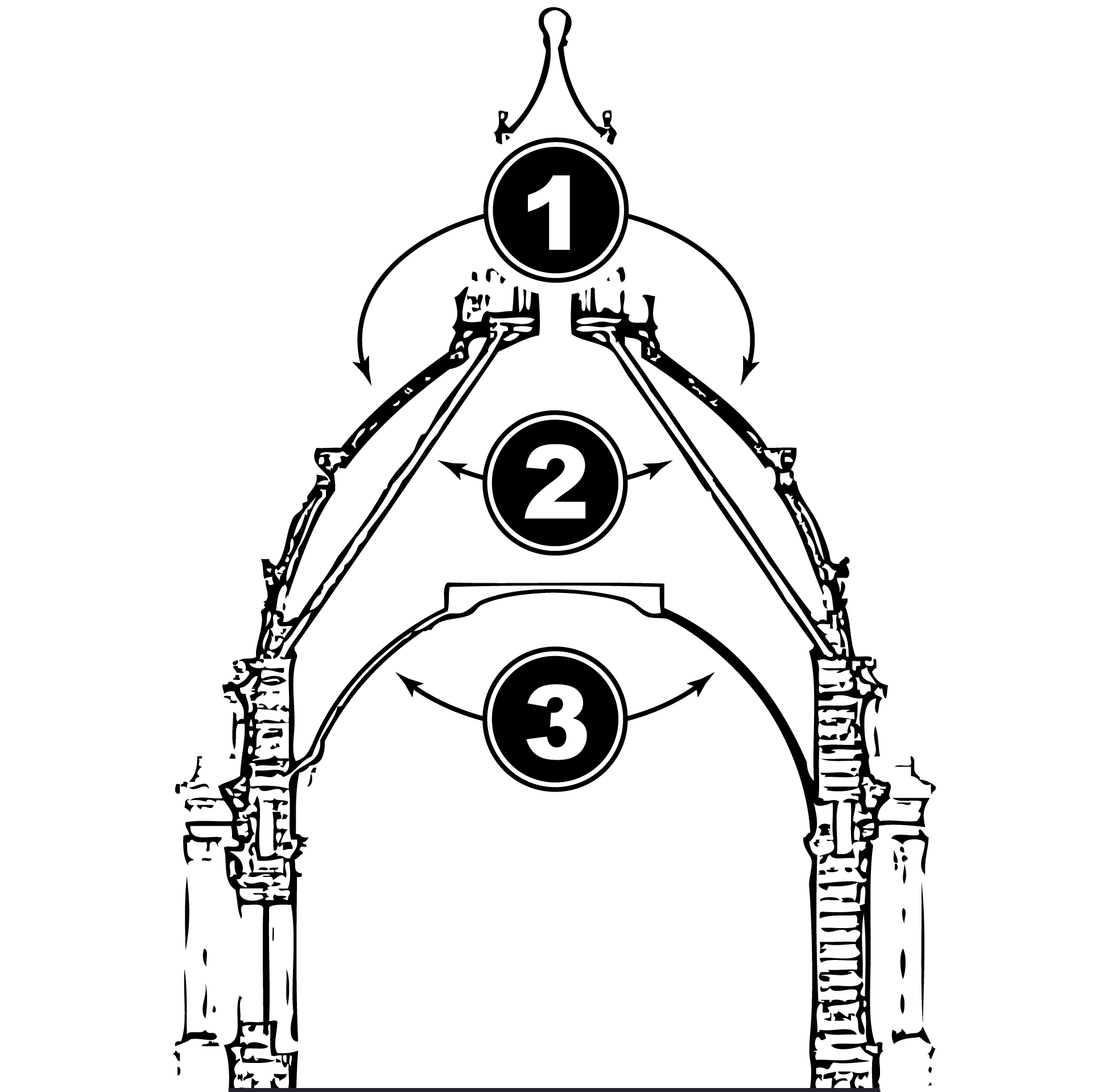
1. Outer marble dome; 2. Middle brick and steel dome; 3. Inner plaster dome.

Dome

The Minnesota State Capitol dome is the second largest self-supported marble dome in the world, behind Saint Peter's Basilica in the Vatican, on which Gilbert based his design. The dome itself is actually made up of three domes or layers. The outer layer is a self-supporting dome made of Georgia marble blocks resting upon their own weight. Hidden inside is a brick and steel cone that supports the lantern and golden sphere at the top of the dome and provides an internal water drainage system, which helps avoid the heaving problem created by the freezing and thawing of Minnesota winters. Below that is the decorative masonry dome that can be seen from the inside, looking up from the rotunda. At the dome's base are 12 marble eagles paired with the columns surrounding the drum of the dome. At the dome's top is a columned stone lantern which is then topped by a finial globe covered in gold leaf.

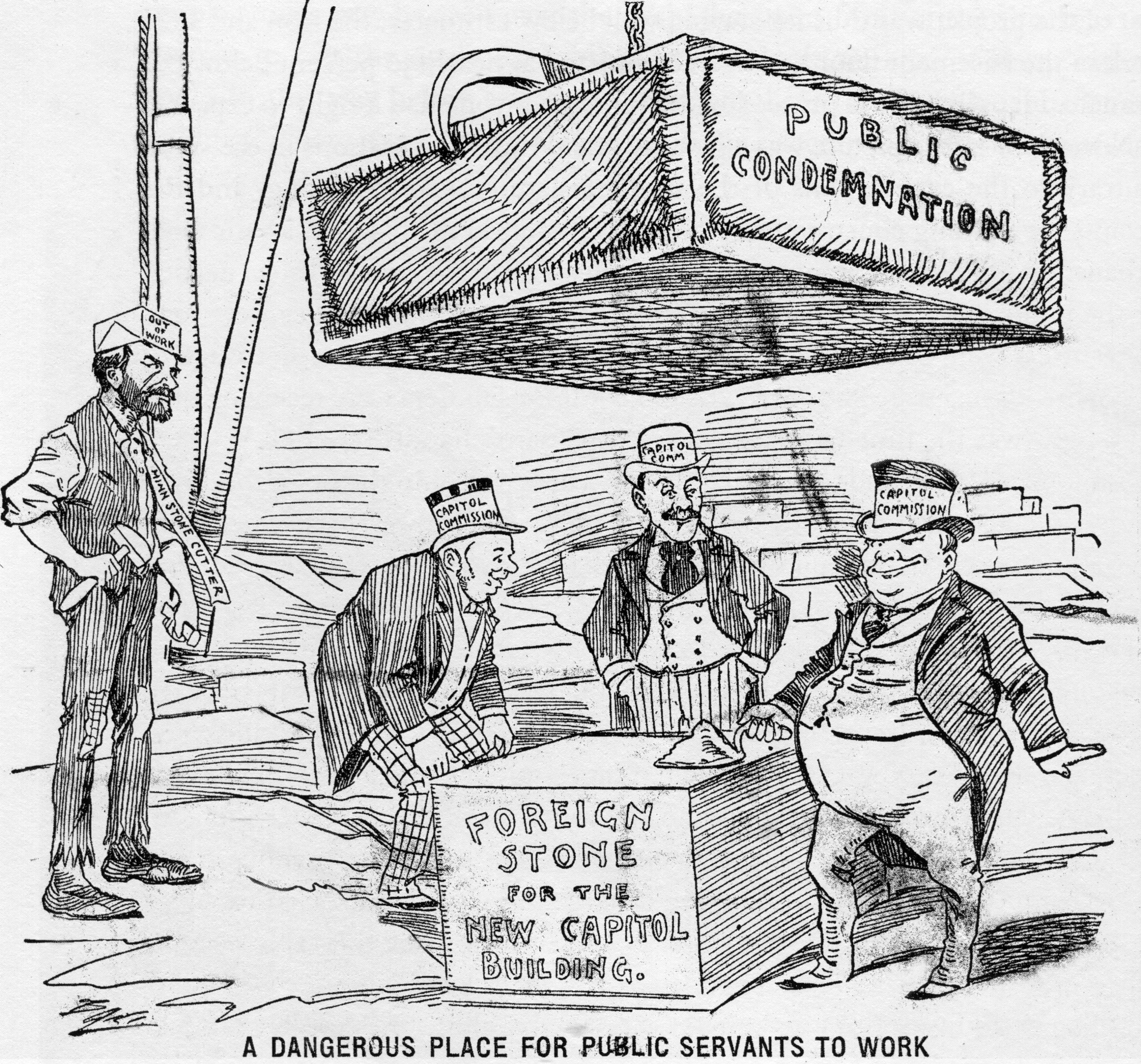
Cartoon from the Minneapolis Journal, ca. 1900

Stone

Because it was just over 30 years after the American Civil War when the building was designed, Gilbert drew ire for choosing marble from Georgia rather than native Minnesota granite for the exterior. Gilbert insisted on using Georgia white marble, saying that the use of a darker color would make it look "glooming and forbidding". A compromise was made with native granite for the steps and the base and interior walls of Kasota limestone, while using the Georgia white marble for the vast majority of the buildings' exterior.

The steps of the two grand staircases in the east and west wings of the Capitol are made of Hauteville limestone, which resembles the Kasota limestone used through the walls of the Capitol but can take more wear. The 36 variegated columns surrounding the grand staircases are made from Breche Violette marble from Italy.

In the rotunda, the giant columns in the four open spaces are made from Minnesota granite. The deep bronze columns on the north and south were quarried near Ortonville, Minnesota and the purplish gray columns on the east and west were quarried near Rockville, Minnesota.

Dividing the statuary niches and the Kasota stone walls in the rotunda from the "Civilization of the Northwest" murals above them is a line of Sioux Quartzite from a quarry in Jasper, Minnesota. Previously it was thought to be Catlinite/Pipestone, which is prized by Native Americans, primarily those of the Plains nations for use in making ceremonial pipes. During the 2013-2017 renovation, the stone was tested and found not to be Catlinite.

== Artwork ==
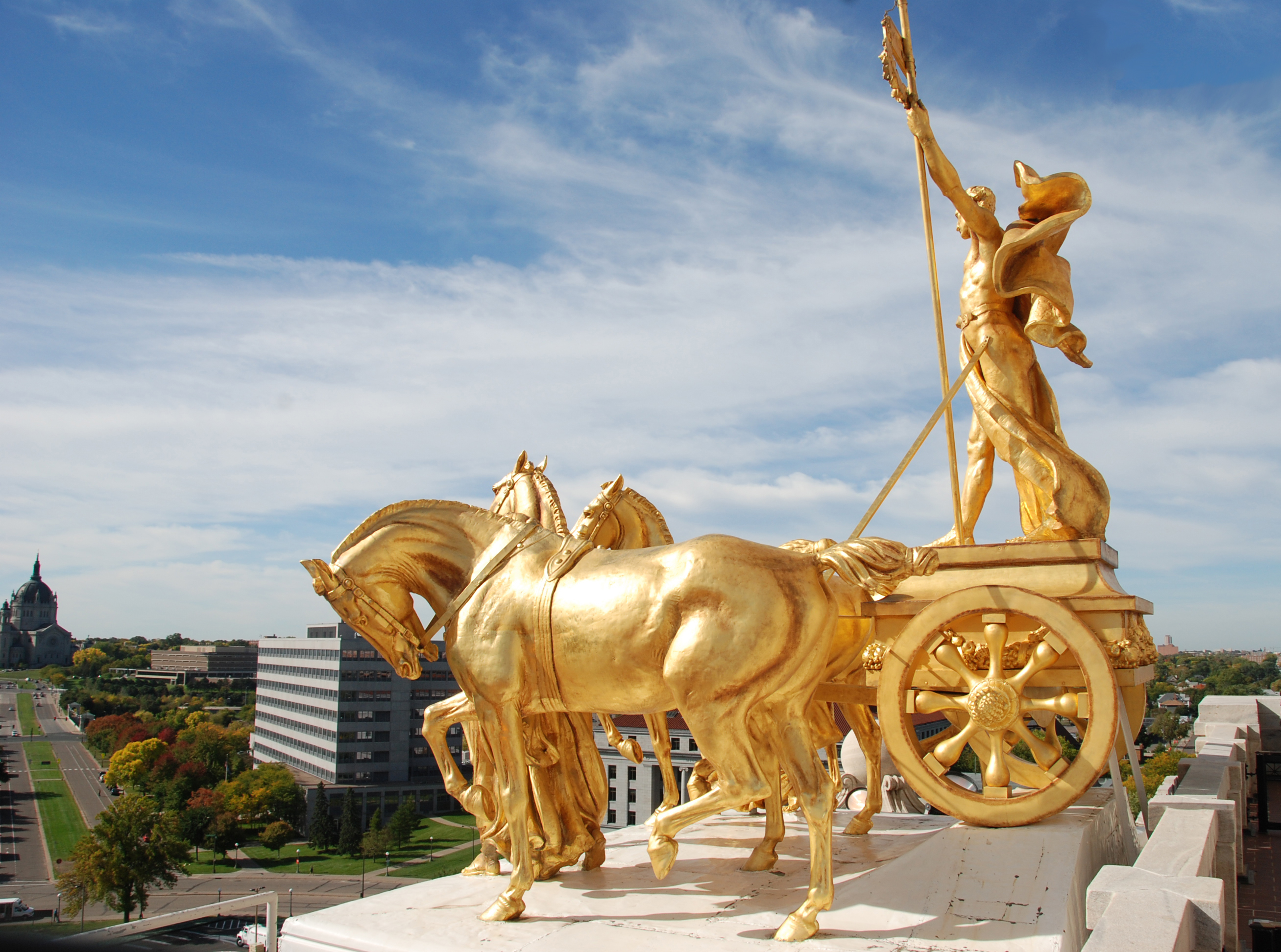
Progress of the State, looking west

The State Capitol opened in 1905 with roughly 60 artworks that totaled $300,000, or 7% of the $4.5-million project budget. Over the years, more art has been added to the Capitol, totaling nearly 150 pieces in 2017.

Gilbert sought out many of the finest artists of the period, such as Kenyon Cox, Elmer Garnsey, Edwin Howland Blashfield, Henry Oliver Walker, Edward Emerson Simmons, John La Farge, Douglas Volk, Francis D. Millet, Howard Pyle, and Rufus Fairchild Zogbaum. Much of the original art is allegorical. Gilbert's trips to Europe encouraged his ideas, but he was more directly influenced by the 1893 World's Columbian Exposition in Chicago. In particular, the inspiration for the Minnesota quadriga, a group of figures entitled Progress of the State, was the Columbus Quadriga, a statue depicting Christopher Columbus standing in a four horse chariot guided by two maidens carrying staffs of victory, that Daniel Chester French and Edward Clark Potter had modeled for the World's Columbian Exposition of 1893 in Chicago. Gilbert saw this quadriga group at the Exposition and made plans to have artists adapt it for Minnesota.

As work continued on the interior, multiple groups, notably American Civil War veterans, the Minnesota Historical Society, and some politicians, demanded that the artwork in the Capitol illustrate historic events of Minnesota's past. The current ornate look of the Governors Reception Room was partly a response to Minnesotans' suggestions for pictures from their own history which gave Gilbert the opportunity to upscale his plans for the room and to include six large paintings that span 200 years of the area's history.

In 1944, the custom of displaying governors' portraits in the public corridors was initiated. In 1971, the Capitol Area Architectural Planning Board and the Minnesota Historical Society were entrusted to approve design, structural composition and location of all works of art.

== Interior ==
Governors Reception Room

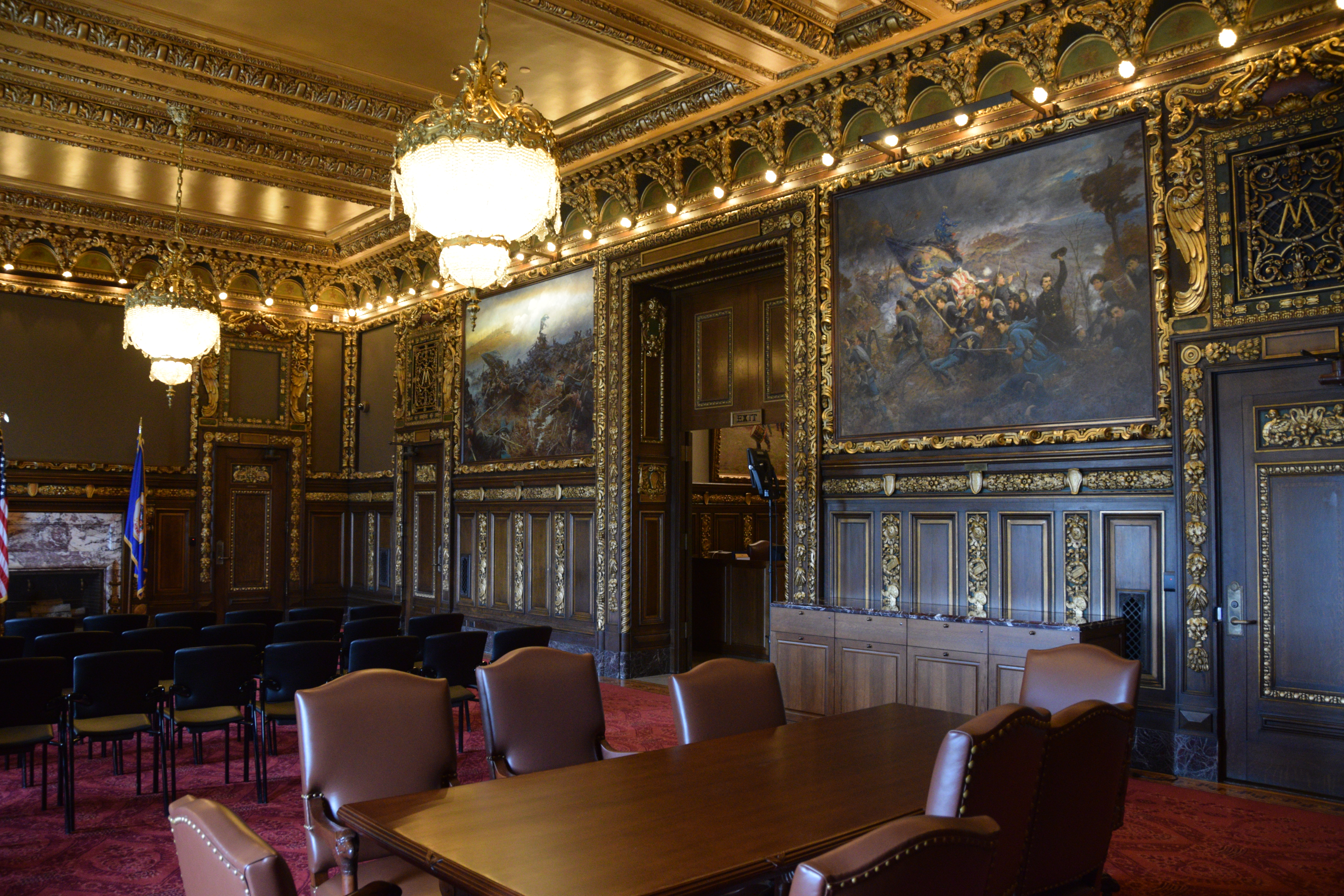
Governor's Reception Room with commissioned artwork

The Governors Reception Room, arguably the most elaborately decorated in the building, is a ceremonial room, designed for state receptions, proclamations, and press conferences.

Gilbert designed the space, which was inspired by his earlier vacation in Europe, on the lines of a Venetian Council Chamber, with stained white oak woodwork and heavy molding gilded with gold leaf framing historical paintings.

The room's ornate look was partly a response to Minnesotans' suggestions for pictures from their own history. Originally Gilbert had planned for the room to be much more modest. "The executive rooms should be finished in perfectly plain color without elaborate decoration of any kind," Gilbert wrote in a 1903 letter to the Board. Responding to popular demand, the Board of State Capitol Commissioners authorized six paintings by four nationally known artists. Gilbert prepared plans for a more ornate room to accommodate paintings of historical subject matter, which were originally considered for the lunettes over the grand stair halls.

In 1968 the red drapes and leather furnishings were replaced with gold velvet curtains and modern armchairs covered in mustard yellow upholstery. With a space shortage in the Capitol, Governor LeVander decided the room should be converted to office use and closed off to the public. There was strong public objection to this temporary solution. Legislators and civic leaders worked to dissuade LeVander, and kept the Reception Room open to visitors. This controversy helped facilitate the recognition for the historic preservation and restoration of many Capitol spaces in the 1970s.

In 1978, when farmers converged on the Capitol to protest powerline construction on their farms, the message "we want a moratorium on powerlines" was carved into one of the antique tables after several hundred protesters crowded into the Reception Room.

Decorations and symbols

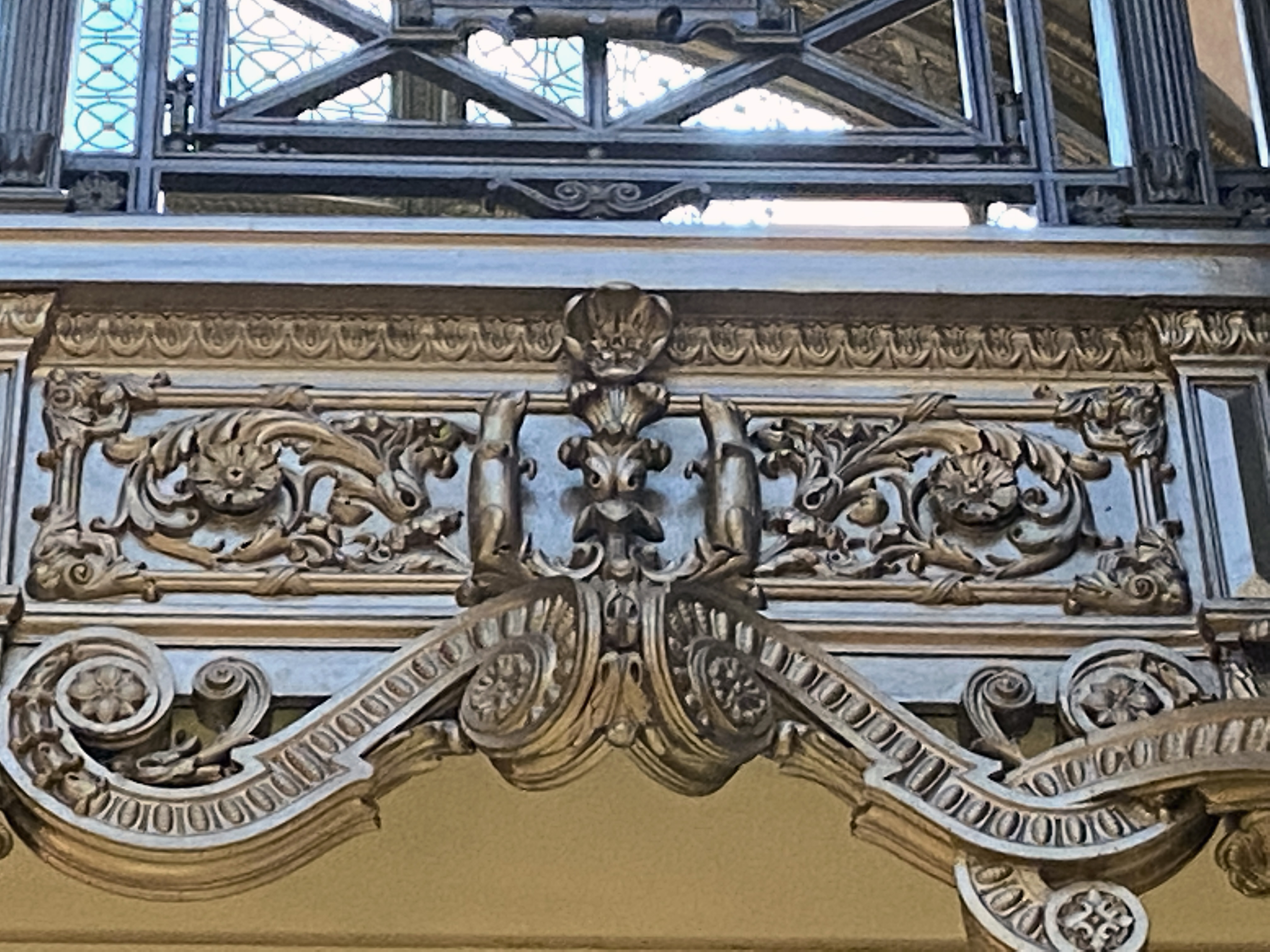
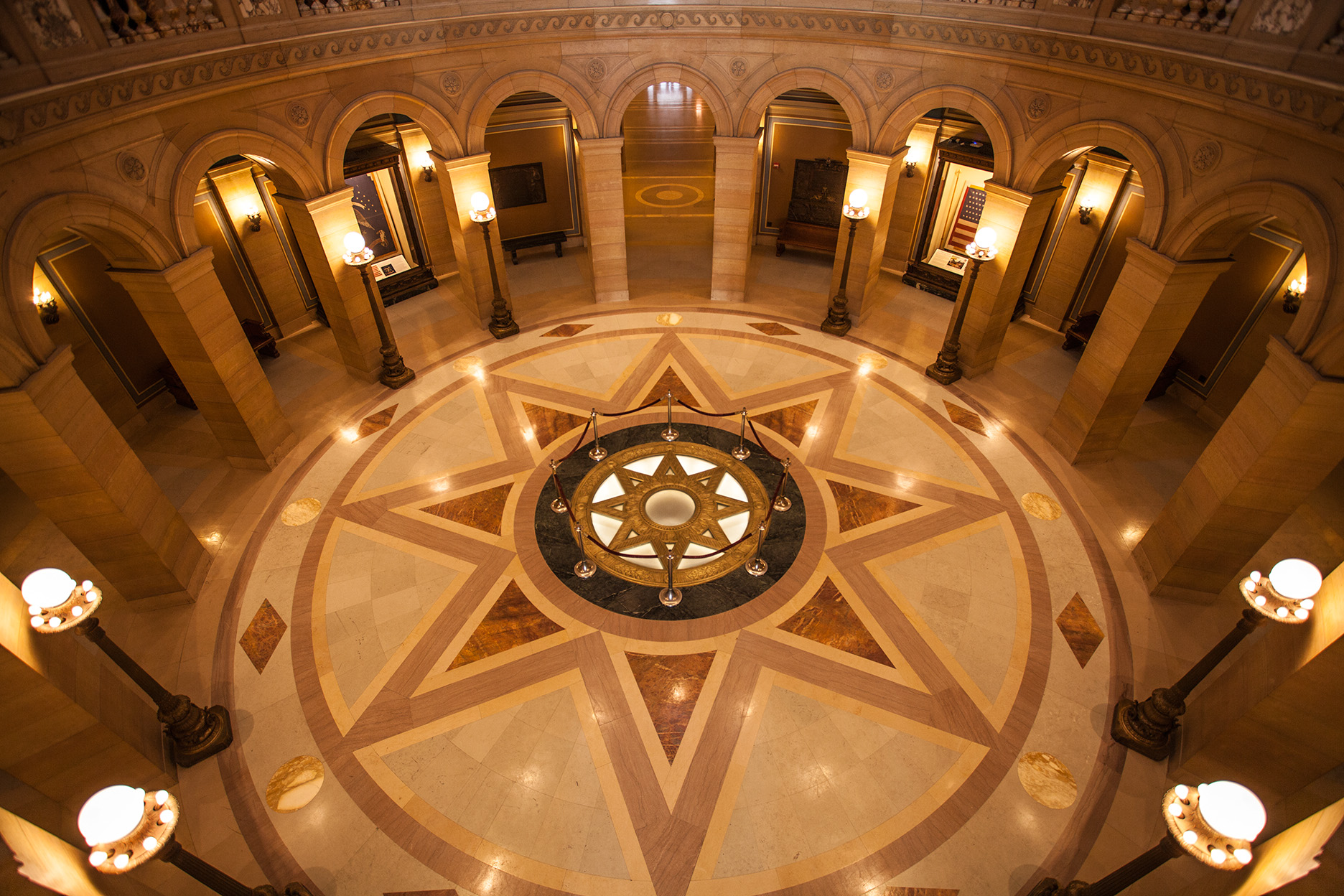
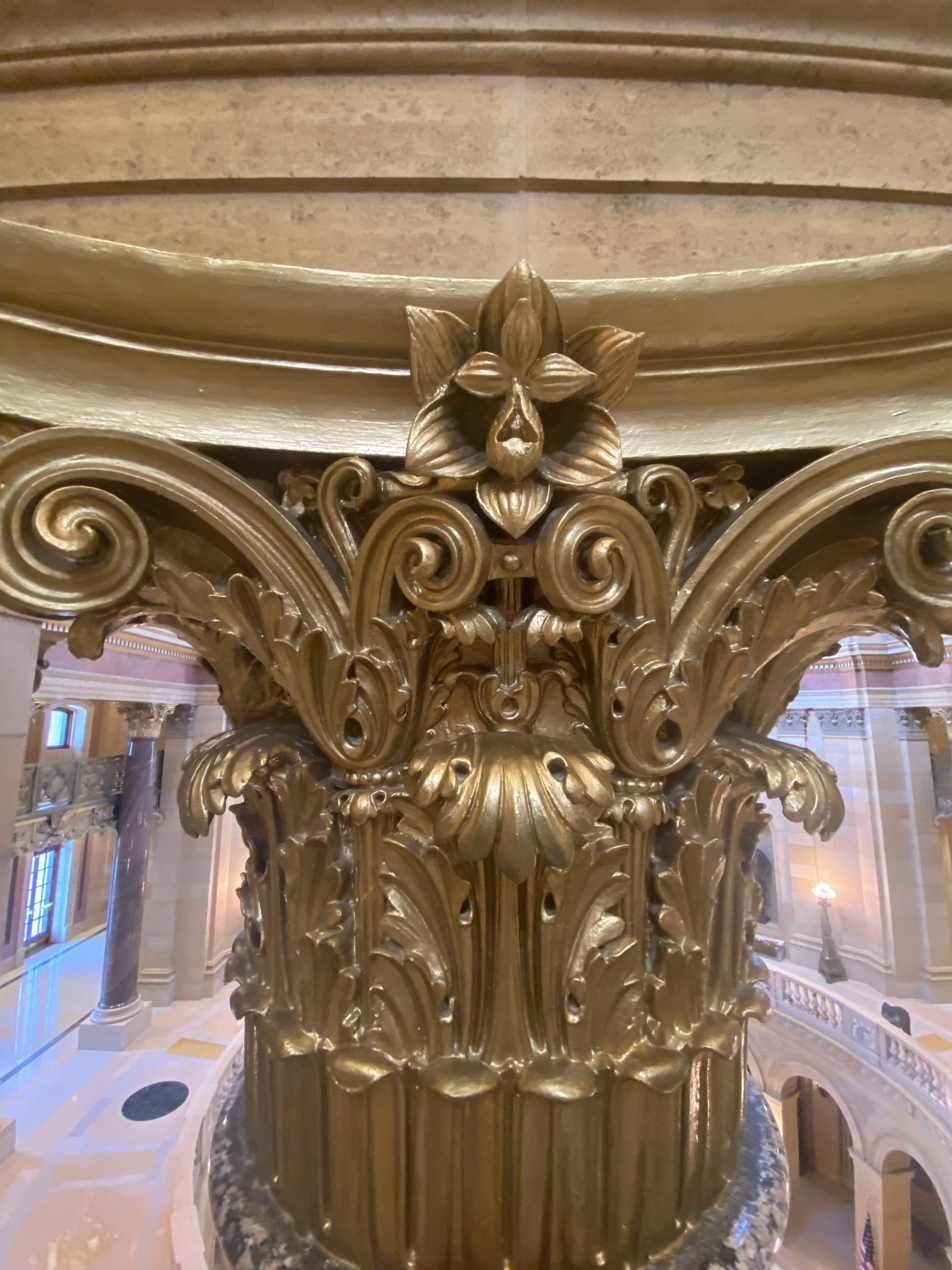
Left to right: Gophers cast in ironwork; Eight-pointed star symbolizing Minnesota's motto, "L'Étoile du Nord" (The Star of the North); Lady Slipper on column

One of several signature features of the Capitol is the brass and translucent glass eight-pointed star symbolizing Minnesota's motto, "L'Étoile du Nord" (The Star of the North), which is set in a circle on the floor of the rotunda below the central dome. The star motif is then repeated in the marble floor of the rotunda with the points of the star using red Numidian marble from the Nile River. The star's glass floor provides natural light to a State Capitol hearing room below. The motto can be seen in other areas of the Capitol stenciled on the walls.

Additional state symbols appear as details in unexpected settings. In a homage to Minnesota's nickname, the "Gopher State", life-sized cast iron gophers rear up on balustrades in the rotunda. The Lady Slipper was adopted as the state flower in 1902, during the Capitol's construction. Gilbert had many of the Corinthian capitals adjusted to feature larger-than-life renditions of the wild orchid found in Minnesota's northern forests.

The dome electrolier (chandelier) is lit every Statehood Day on May 11, commemorating when Minnesota became the 32nd state in the union on May 11, 1858.

American Civil War themes

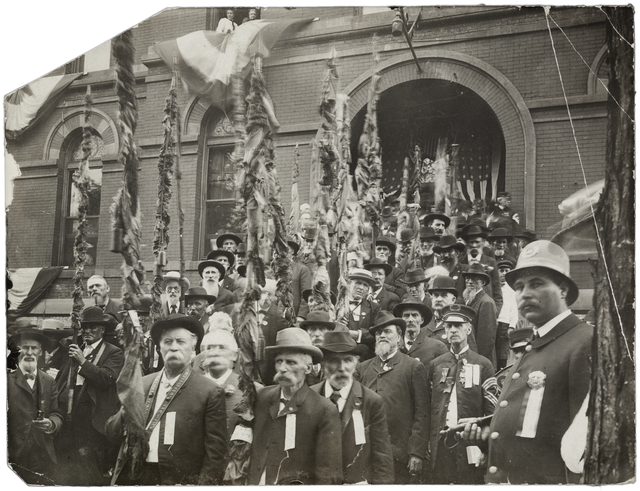
Removal of the battle flags from the old to the new Capitol, June 14, 1905

Gilbert had originally planned that art decorating the capitol interior would be mainly allegorical in nature. However, the Board of State Capitol Commissioners was approached by American Civil War veterans and Minnesota legislators who felt the artwork in the Capitol should depict real events in the states past rather than allegorical imagery. In particular they wanted recognition of Minnesota's military units. Additional funds were lacking to build a desired immense obelisk outside the Capitol that was to be the memorial to veterans. These issues convinced Gilbert to amend his vision and include Civil War homages inside the Capitol building.

Four of the six paintings originally installed in the Governor's Reception Room included Civil war themes, as did the two paintings in the Governor's Anteroom. Gilbert originally seemed to want any statues in the second floor rotunda niches to be Minnesota Senators or U.S. Presidents; however, the statues finally installed between 1909 and 1914 were of Civil War veterans. Years after the construction was done, more plaques and benches memorializing Minnesotans who served in the Civil War were added between the 1920s and 1930s as the result of lobbying done by veterans groups and legislators. While there is no official designation, quality and volume of American Civil War art and historic artifacts in the capitol building gives the semblance the Capitol being a memorial to Civil War veterans.

== Capitol Mall ==
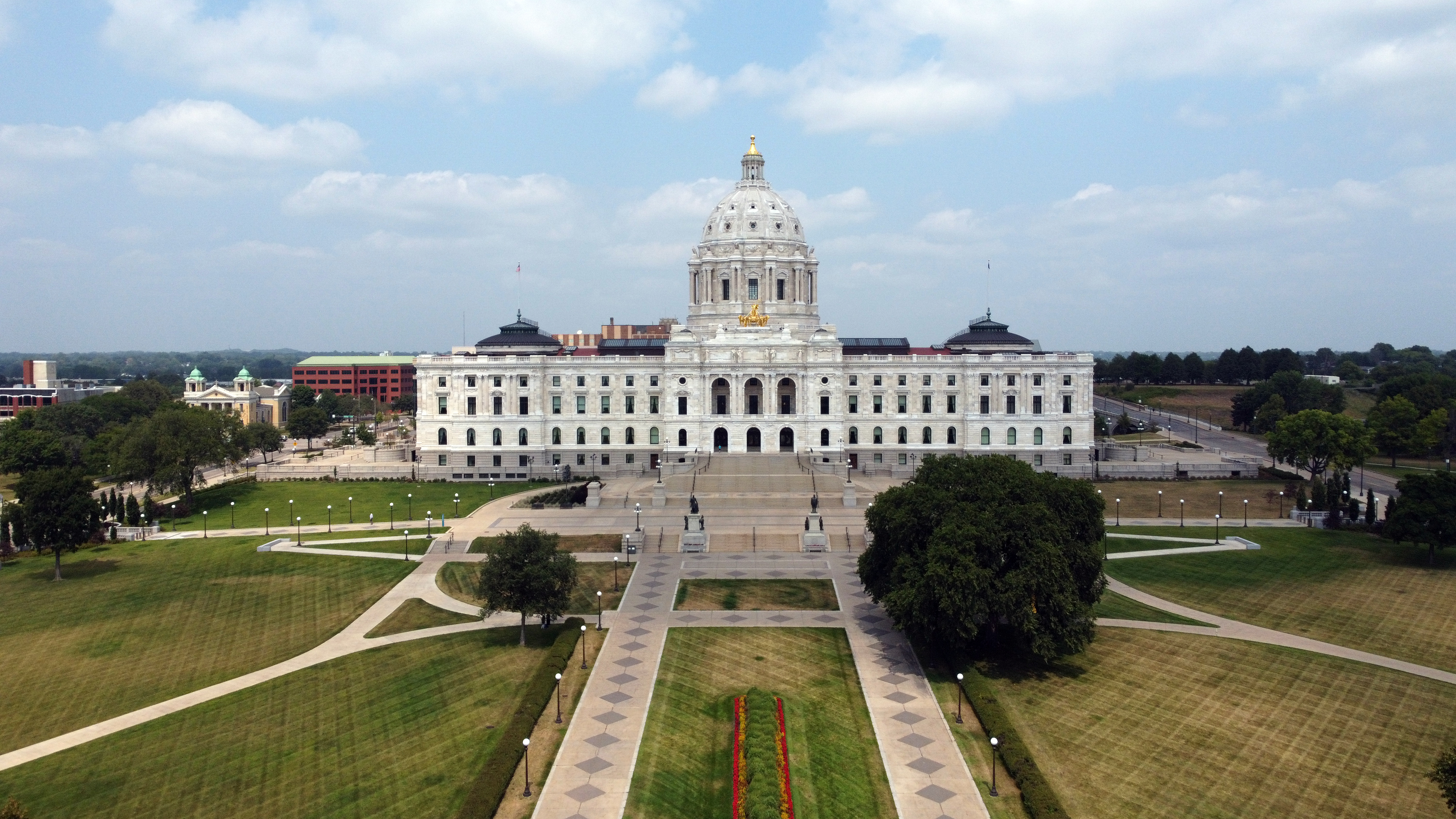
Capitol with mall in foreground

On the Capitol's south front is the State Capitol Mall, which includes eighteen acres of green space. Over the years, monuments and memorials have been added to the mall. The mall and the Capitol building itself are overseen by the Capitol Area Architectural and Planning Board (CAAPB), a small state agency consisting of twelve members.

Cass Gilbert envisioned his State Capitol building in a setting of plazas and axial and radial avenues, but his commission was initially limited to the building only due to lack of funds.

As time went on, the aging neighborhood surrounding the Capitol increasingly deteriorated. Work to transform the area and to develop at least partially Gilbert's vision of landscaped grand boulevards providing key approaches to the capitol began after World War II. The work was largely complete by 1955, leaving the State Capitol Mall with the overall form that still provides the setting for the Minnesota State Capitol.

== 2013 to 2017 renovation ==
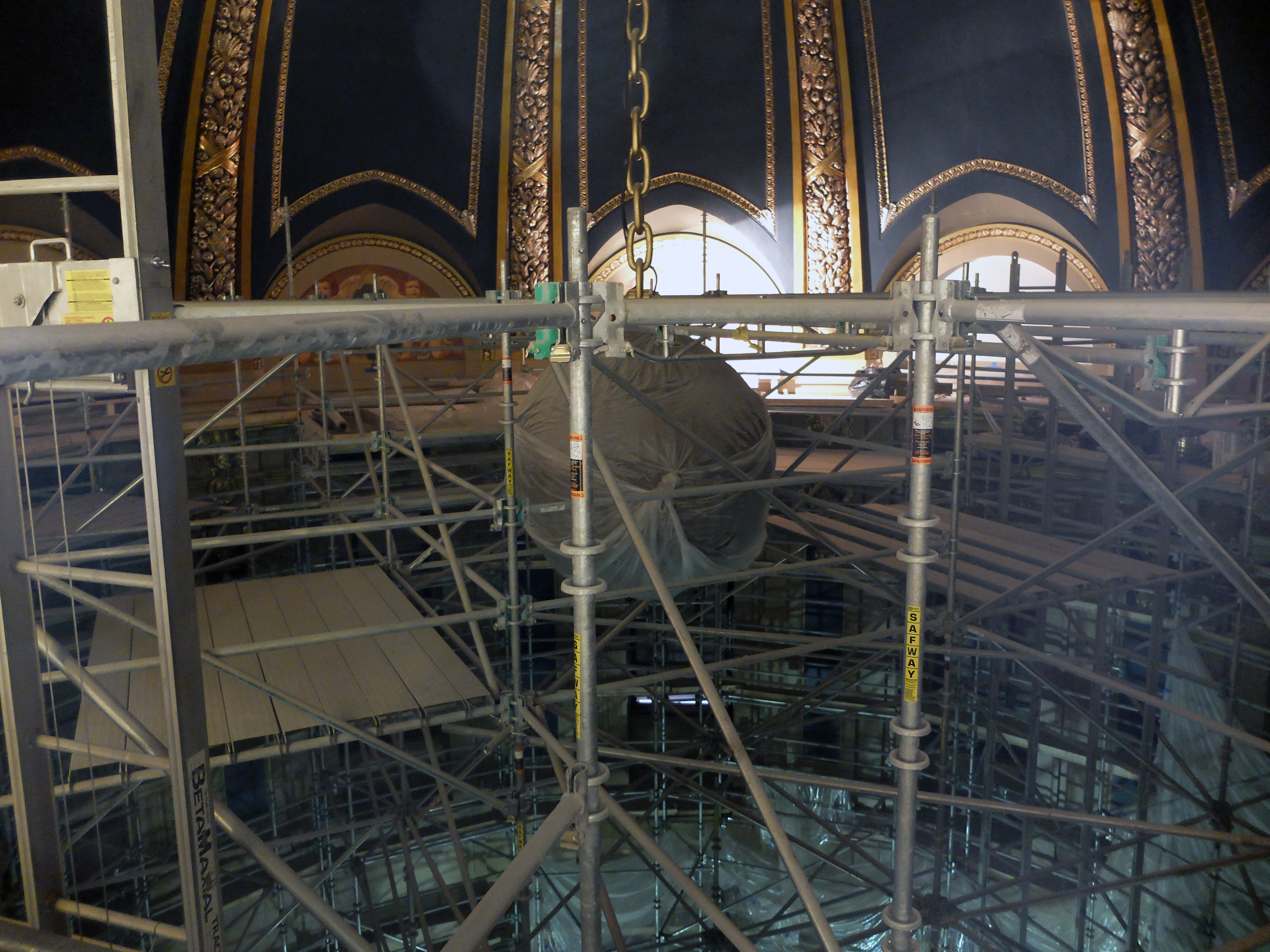
Dome scaffolding around the electrolier in the rotunda

The Minnesota State Capitol underwent a comprehensive restoration project from 2013 to 2017, the first major renovation since the building first opened.

Work began in 2013, with the project estimated at that time to cost $241 million, funded via a series of appropriations made by the Minnesota legislature. The project repaired and modernized deteriorating building systems, restored the building to Cass Gilbert's original architectural vision, increased public meeting space (including a new classroom for the Minnesota Historical Society to host school groups and provide information about the building), updated life safety systems, and improved accessibility for people with disabilities.

3-D modeling was used to incorporate details about materials and other characteristics of particular parts of the structure. It was used to help with aspects of planning which included the positioning of new HVAC units that required the doubling of ductwork in order to meet modern code requirements but not be noticed or mar the historic character of the building. The laser scanning done to confirm the accuracy of the digital model also showed that Gilbert's original architectural drawings proved to be very accurate to what was built.

The original Georgia marble stone on the exterior had badly deteriorated from weathering, and underwent comprehensive restoration that included 20,000 repairs with 6,000 pieces replaced. The stone was obtained from the same quarry as the original marble. Some historic details removed during previous renovations, were restored or recreated such as the Capitol's public elevators on the south side of the building which were outfitted with leaded-glass fronts reminiscent of the originals which had been discarded and replaced by stainless steel doors in the late 1960s.

The amount of public space in the building was doubled to nearly 40,000 square feet, with a number of new public spaces opened to the public for reservation and use year round. Mechanical systems in the Capitol's basement were buried under the floor to help create new public spaces including the Etoile du Nord Vault event space directly under the rotunda.

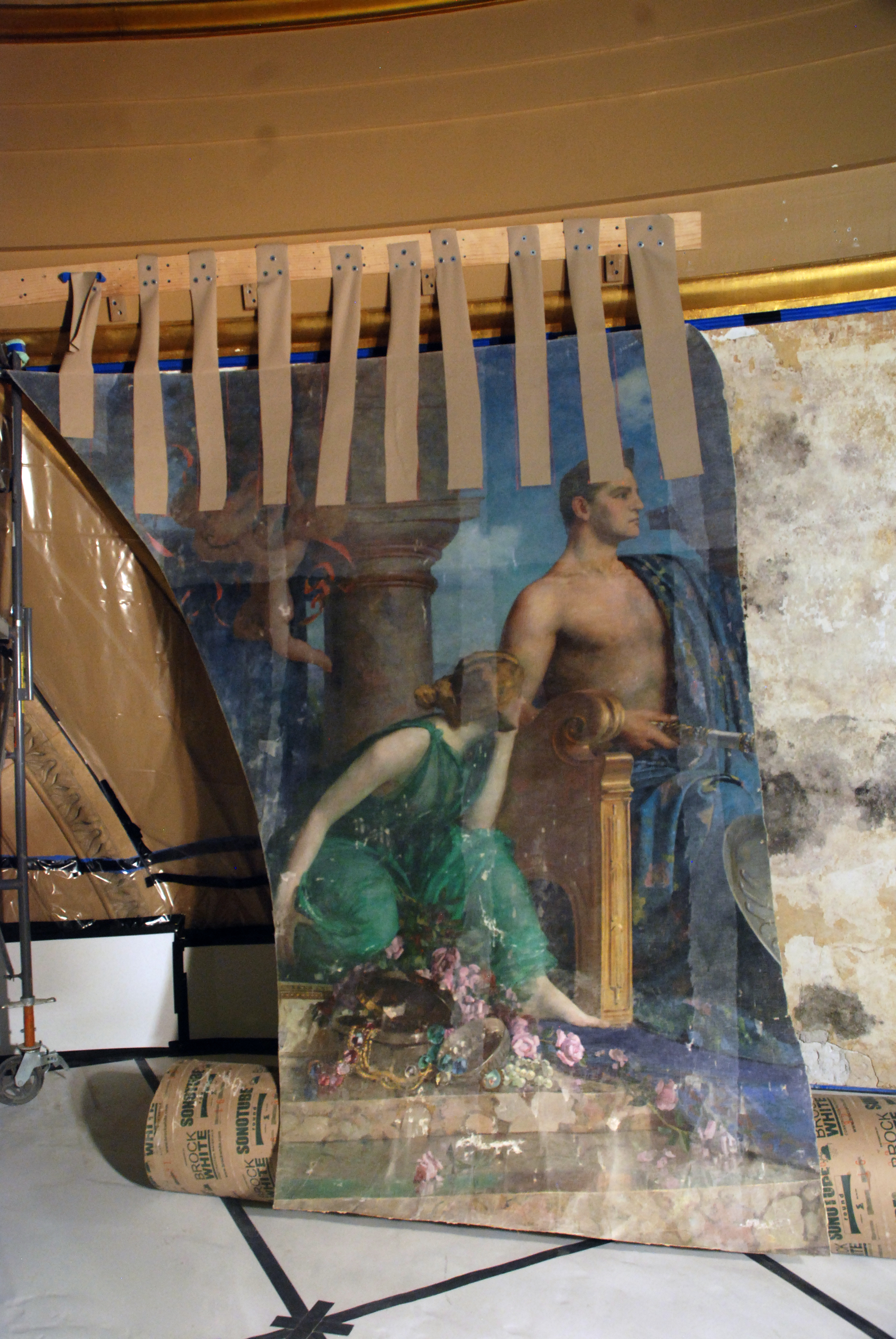
Mural removal for restoration

The project also included a restoration of the capitol's many works of fine art, which prompted discussions over some paintings in the building that feature controversial depictions of American Indians. A series of public input meetings were held around the state to gather feedback and consider options for new policies regarding art in the renovated building. When the building reopened, two of these paintings, Father Hennepin Discovering the Falls of St. Anthony, and the Treaty of Traverse des Sioux were relocated while others remained in place.

The renovation forced the House and Senate to hold a special session in the nearby State Office Building in 2015. During the regular 2016 session, the Senate met in the newly completed Senate Office Building, with the capitol open for only limited access to the House chamber during the session.

By the time of its completion in 2017, the total cost of the renovation project reached about $310 million. The bulk of construction was completed by the start of the 2017 legislative session in January. The project was officially completed in August 2017, at which point all of the building's newly renovated spaces opened to the public.

== Public access ==
After its current restoration, the removal of office spaces on the third floor and mechanical and storage spaces in the basement opened up new public gathering spaces, meeting rooms, and exhibit areas, many of which can be reserved for use by members of the public. The Minnesota Historical Society operates the Capitol Information and Tour Center. The building is open to the public most days of the week, and guided tours are available. Tours on special topics surrounding the Capitol occur throughout the year. The Minnesota State Capitol Third Floor Gallery features rotating non-permanent exhibits featuring Minnesota art, culture, and history.

== Gallery ==
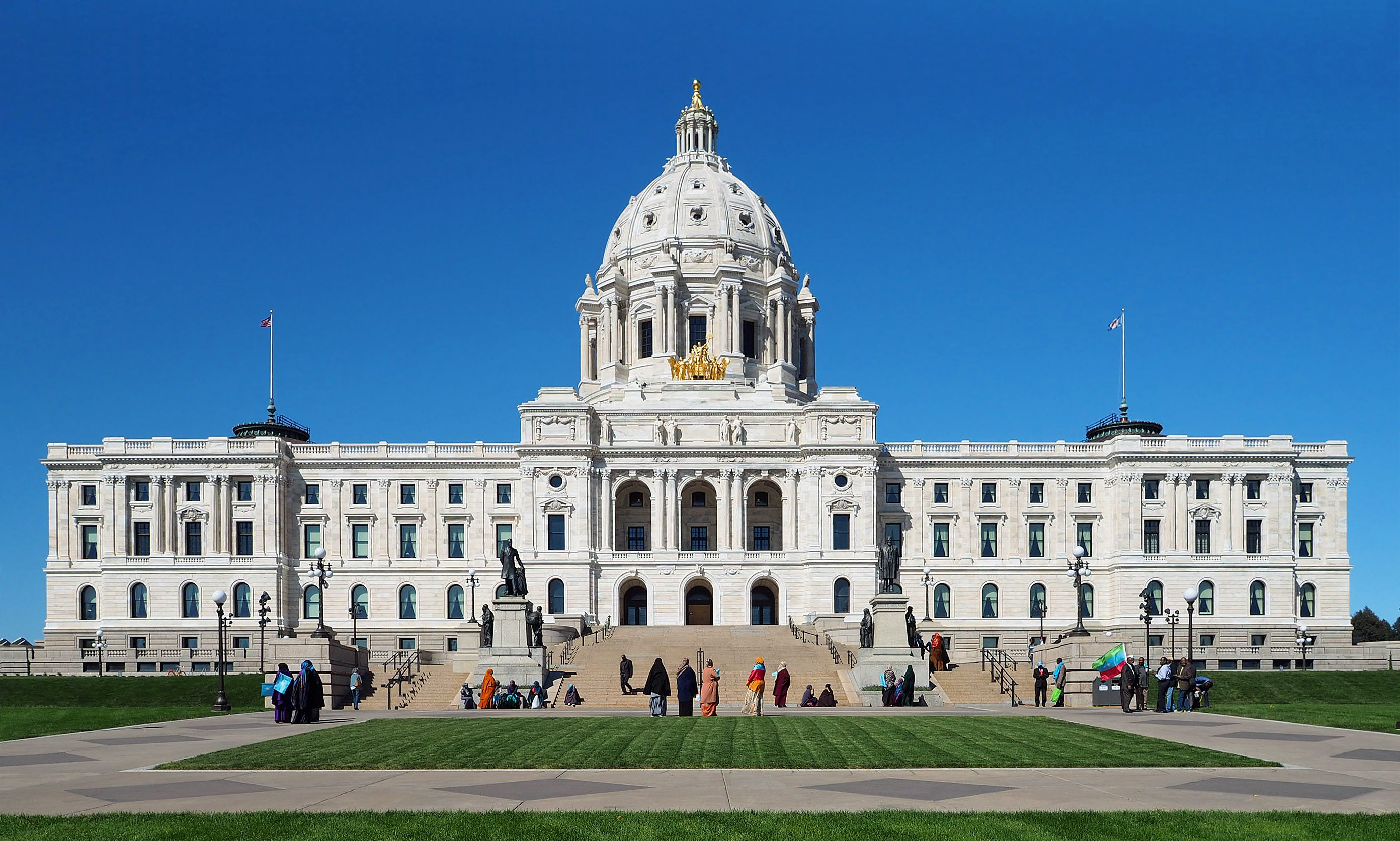
South side of the Capitol

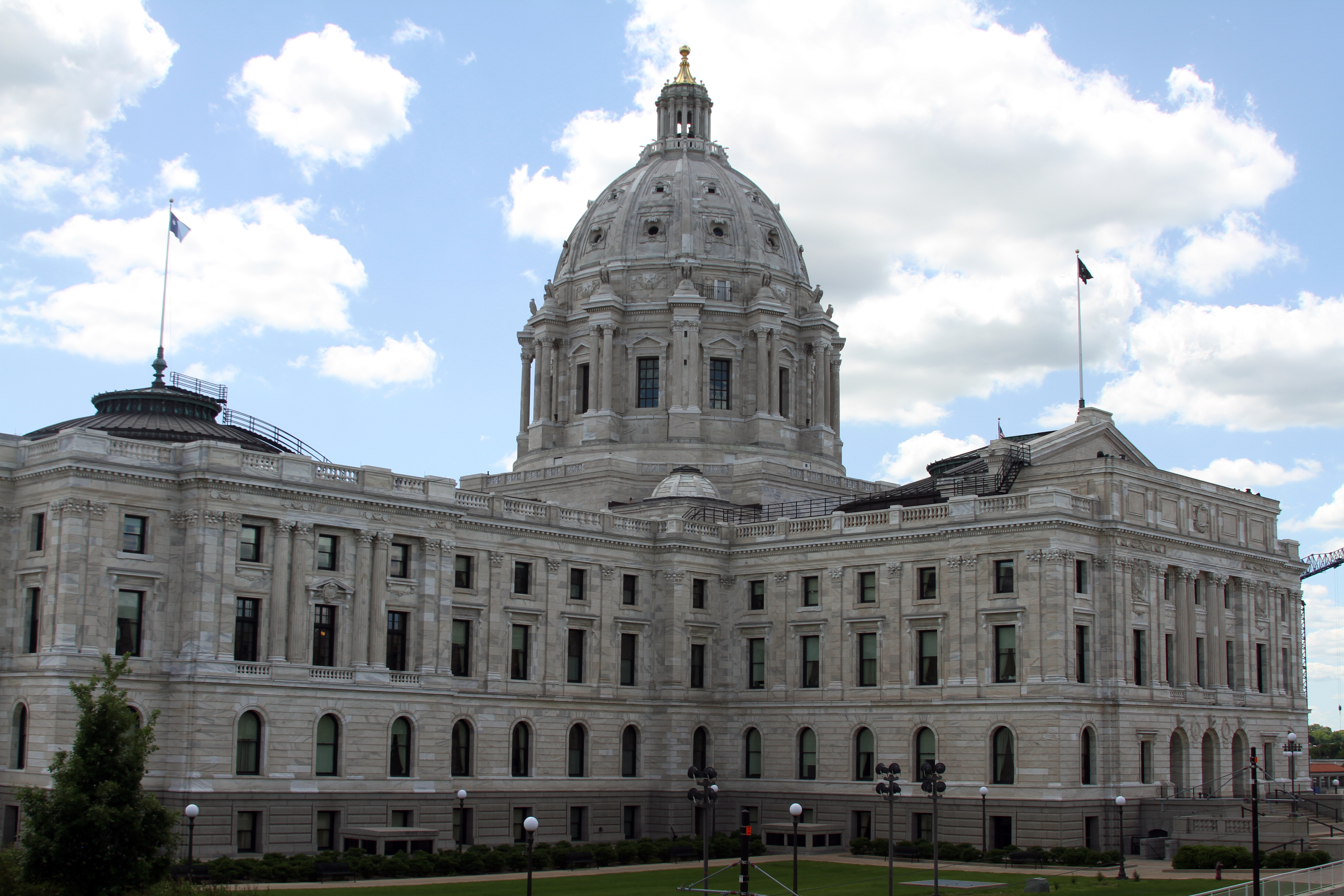
North side of the Capitol

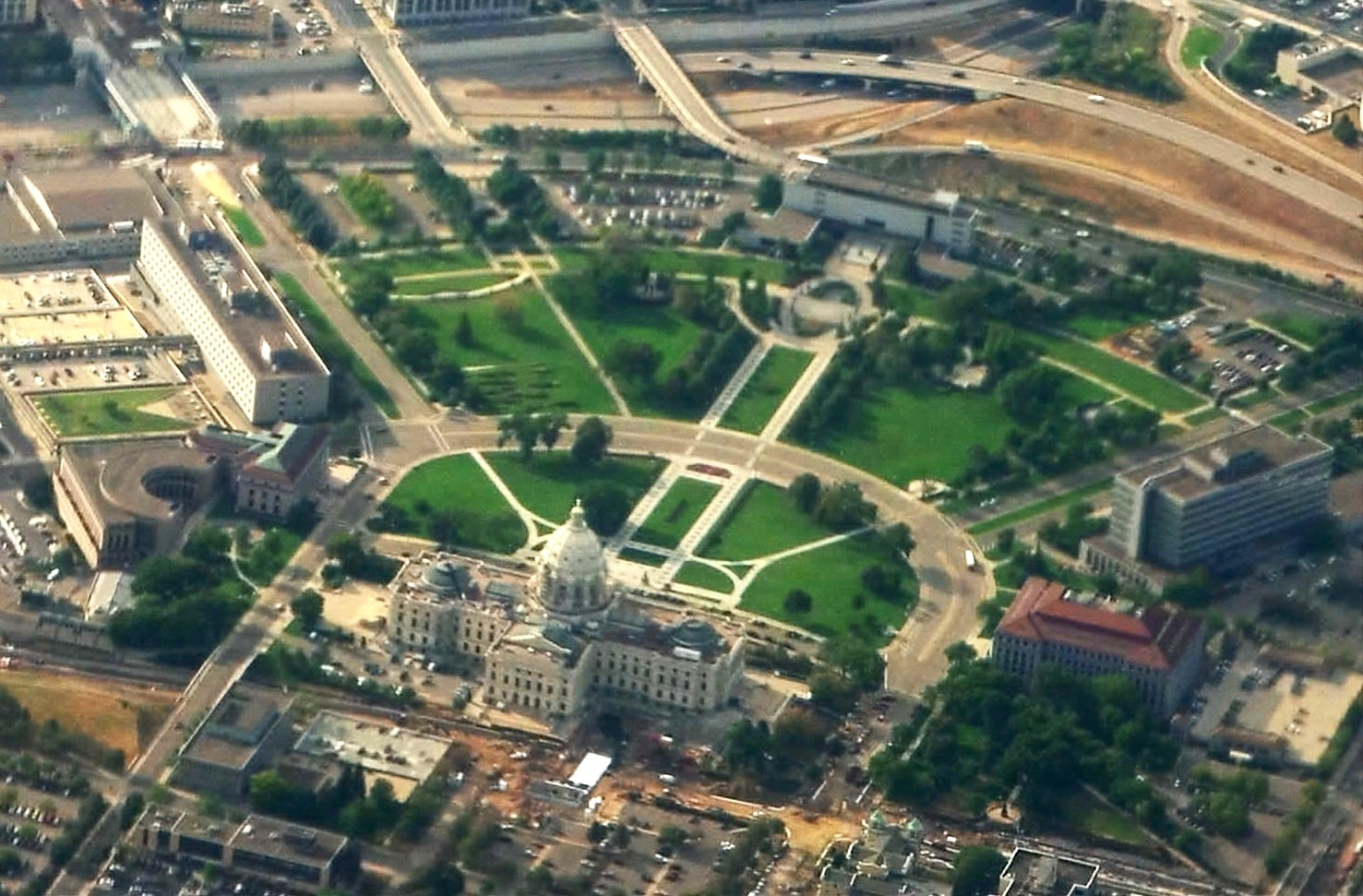
Aerial view of the Capitol campus

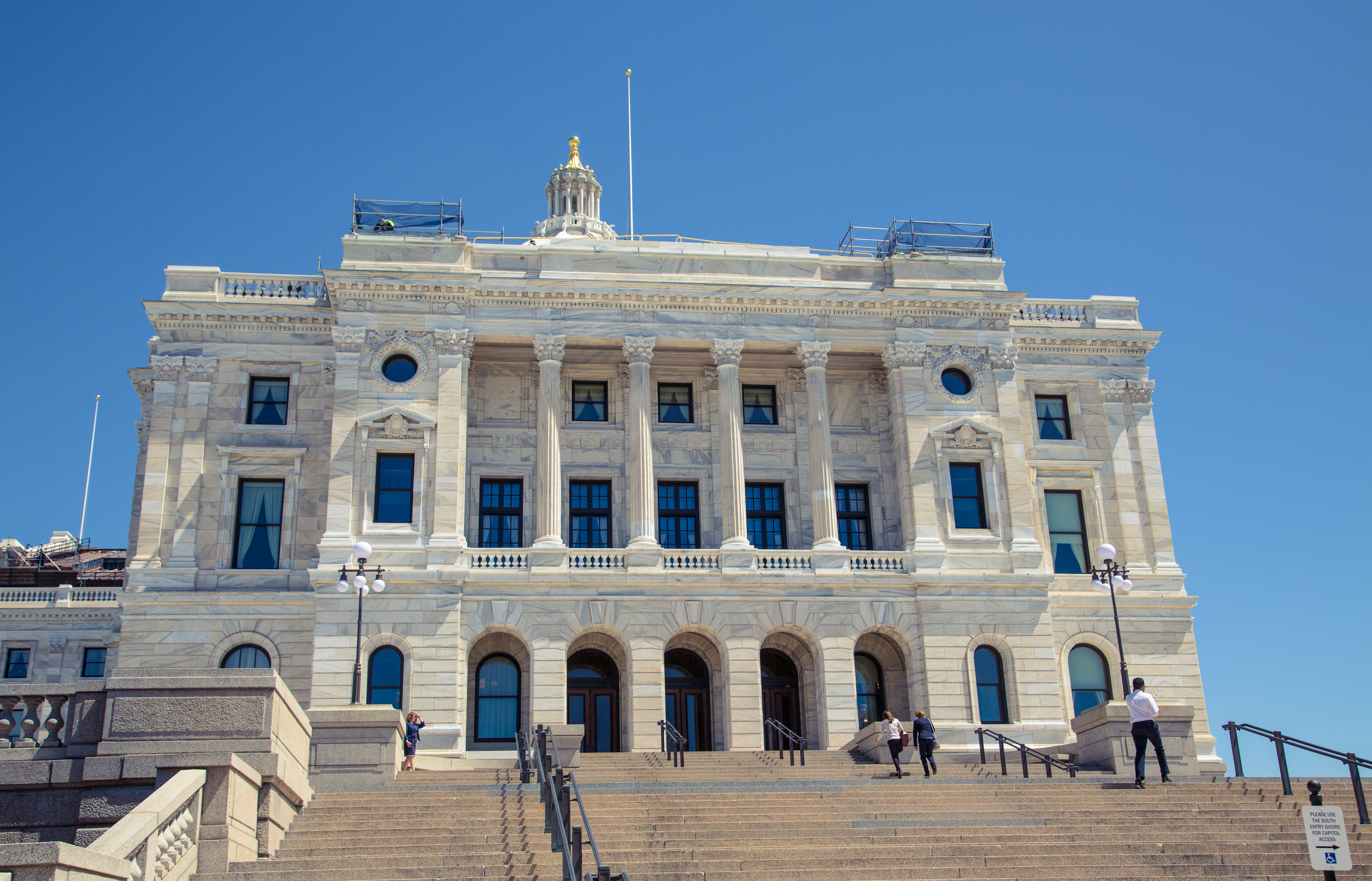
Western steps to the Capitol

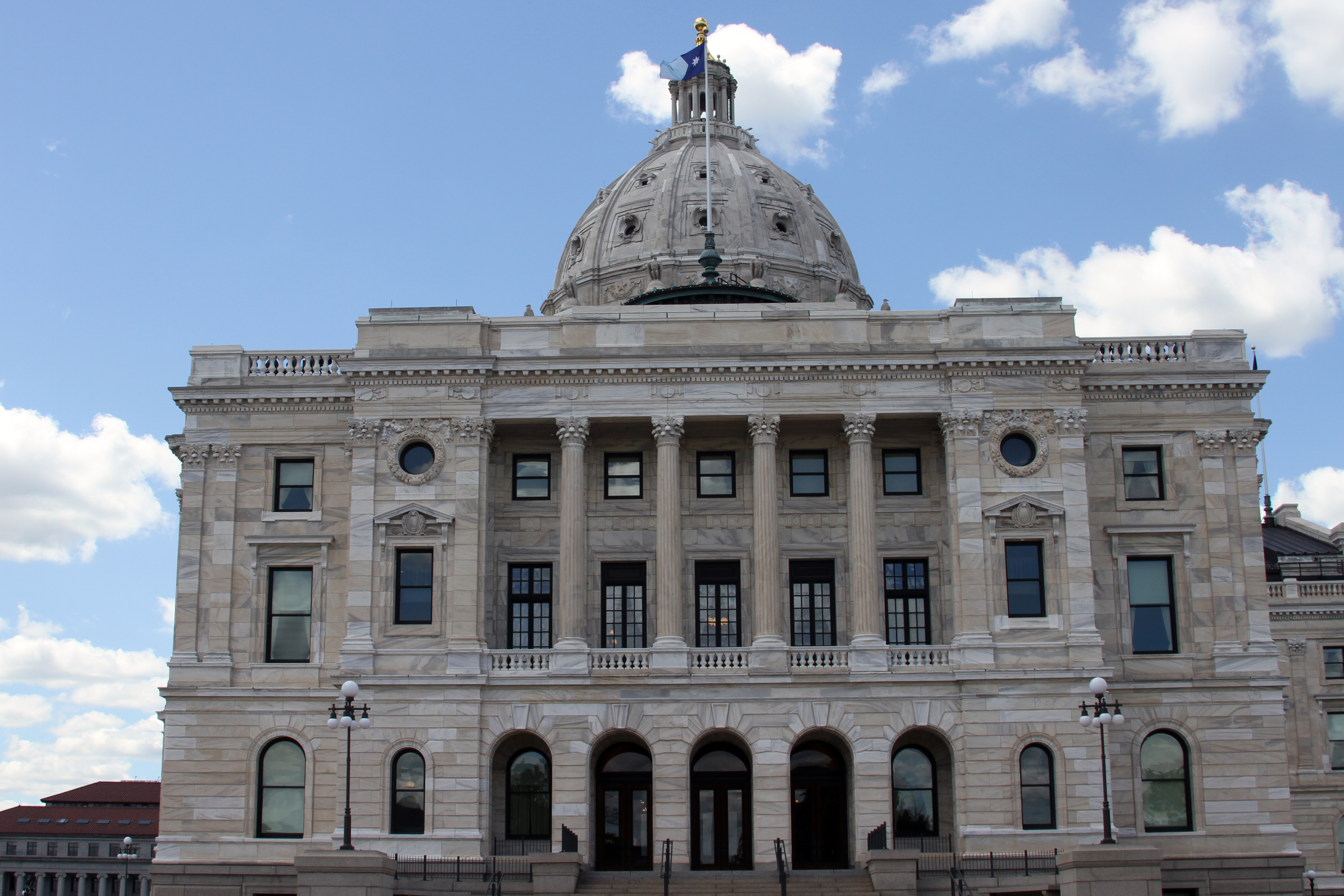
Eastern steps to the Capitol

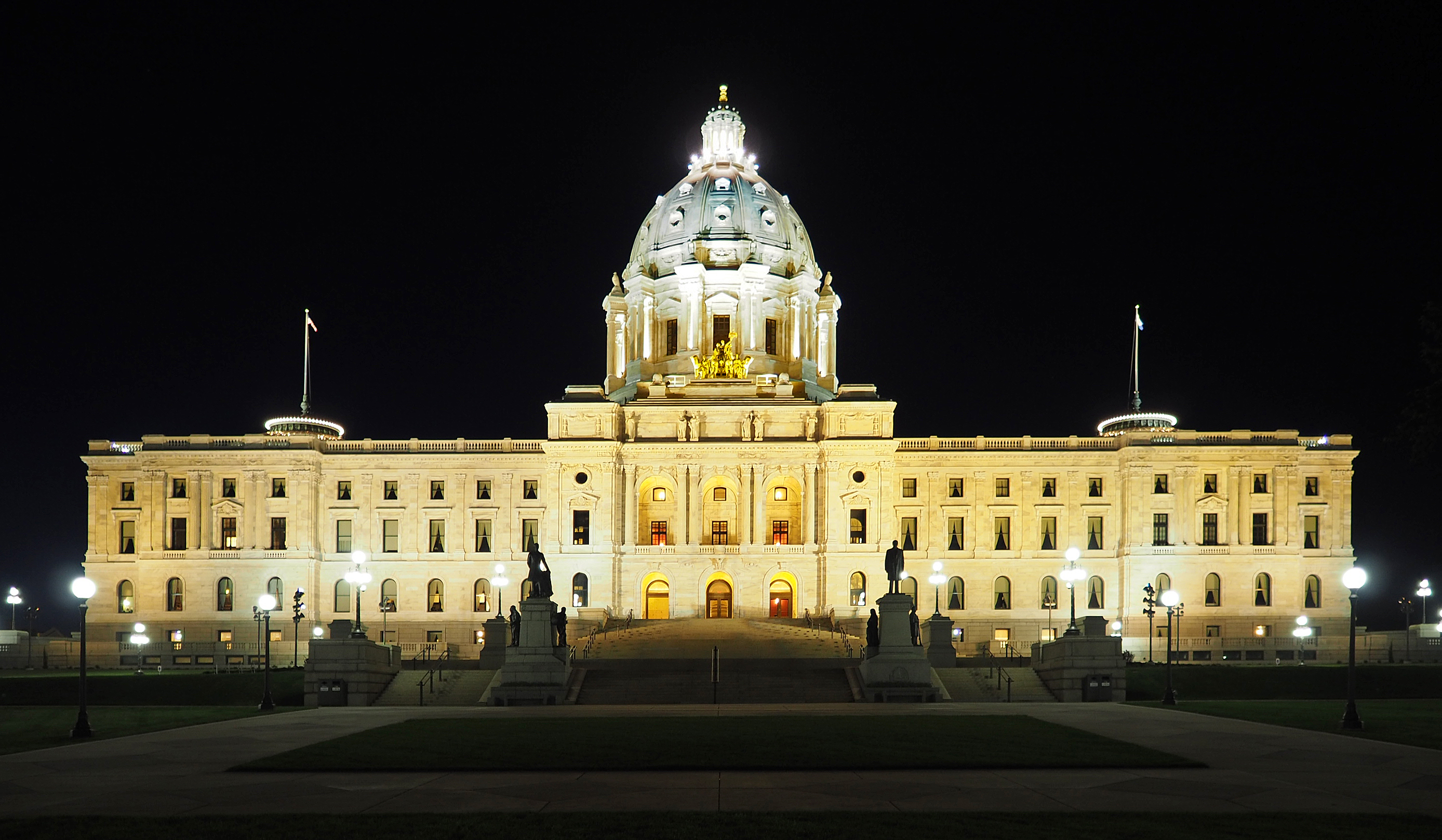
Capitol at night

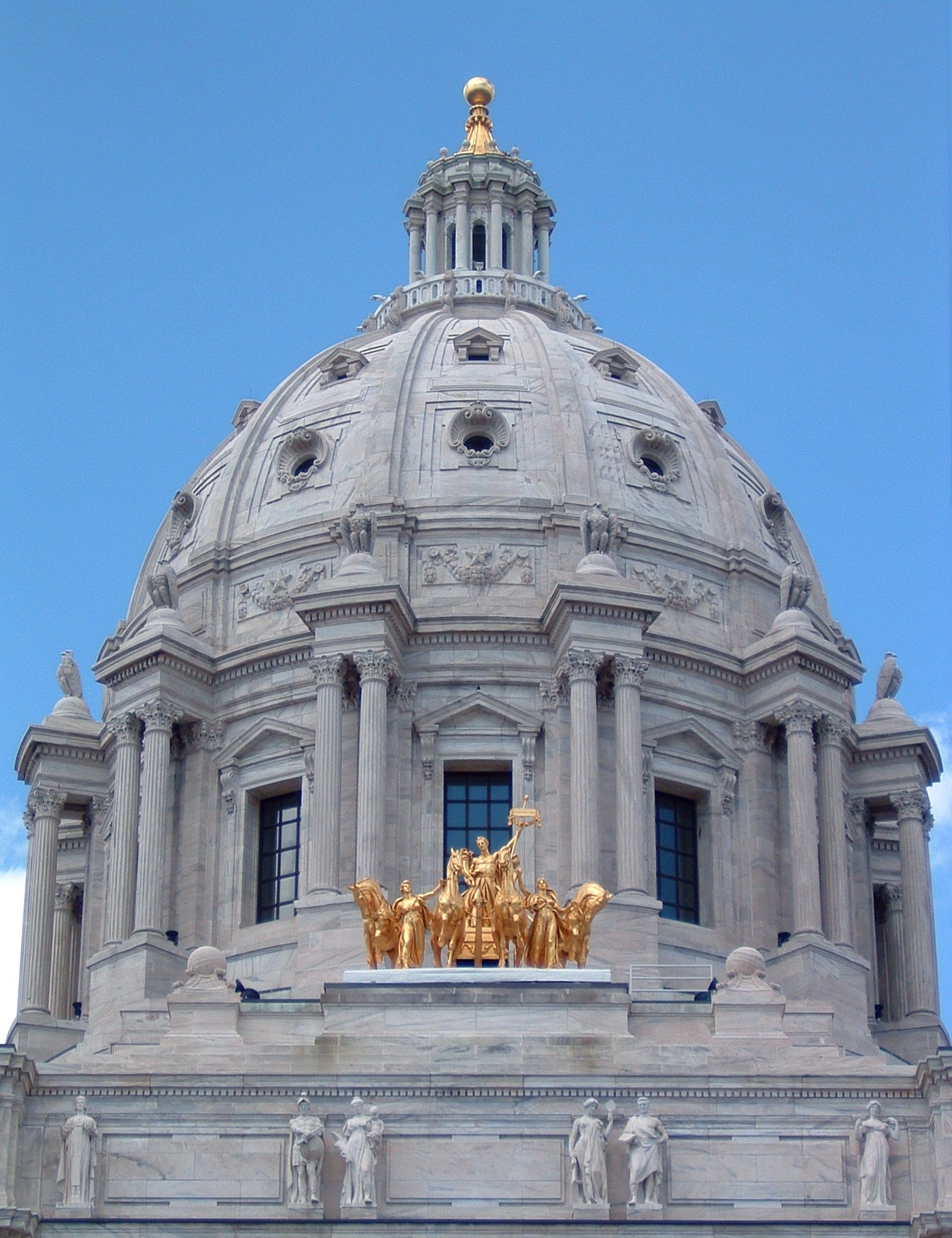
Marble dome

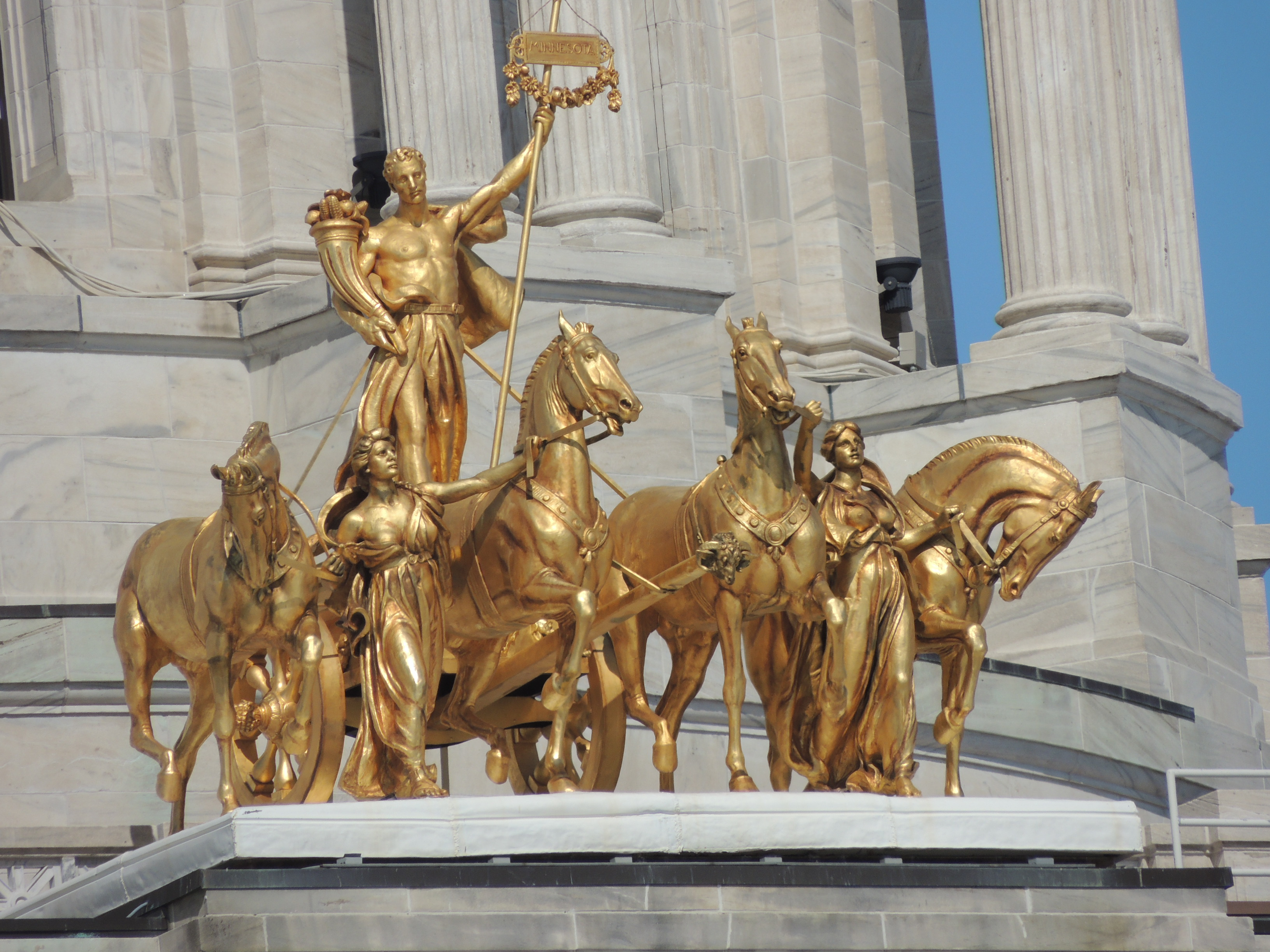
The Progress of the State (Quadriga)

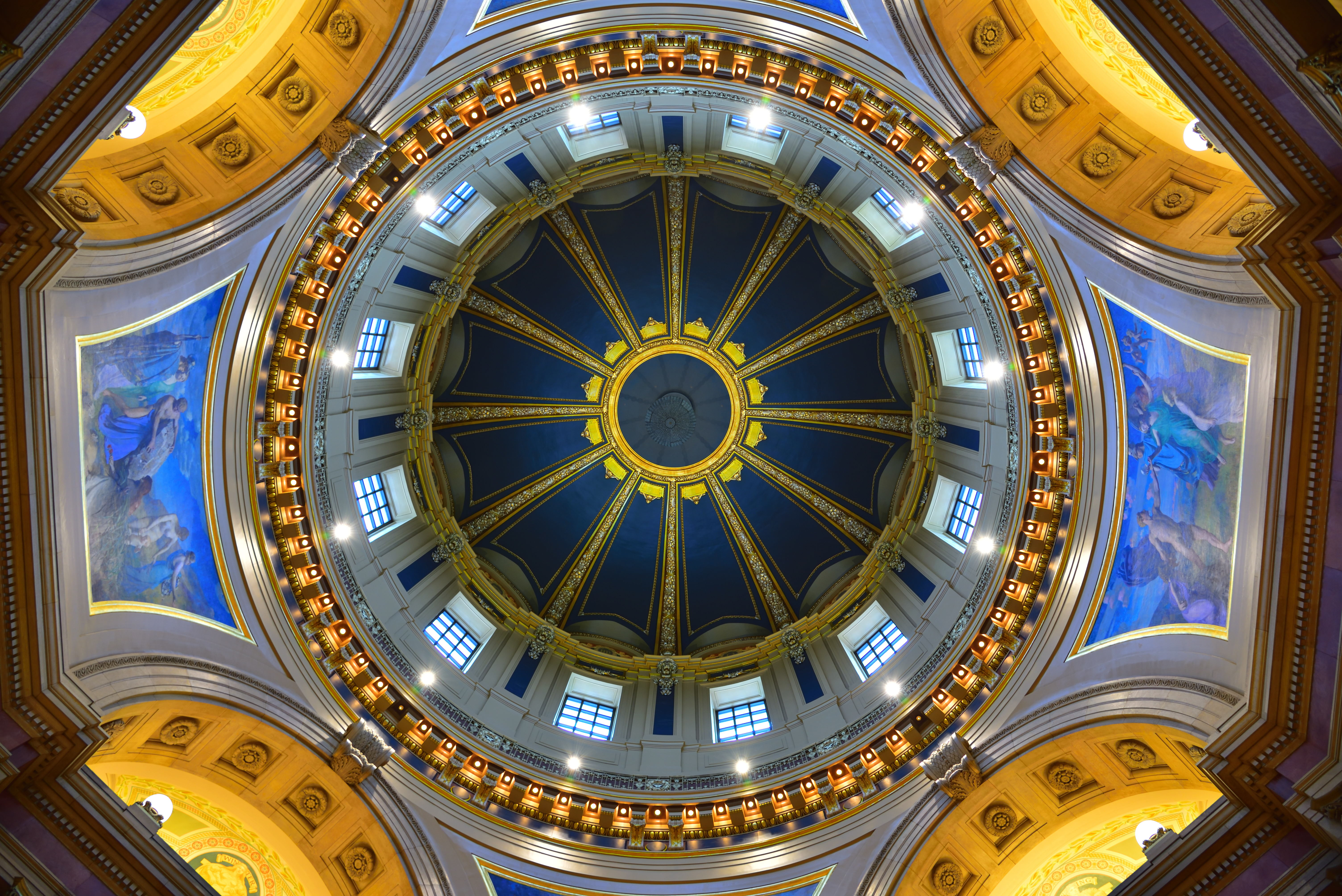
Inside the dome

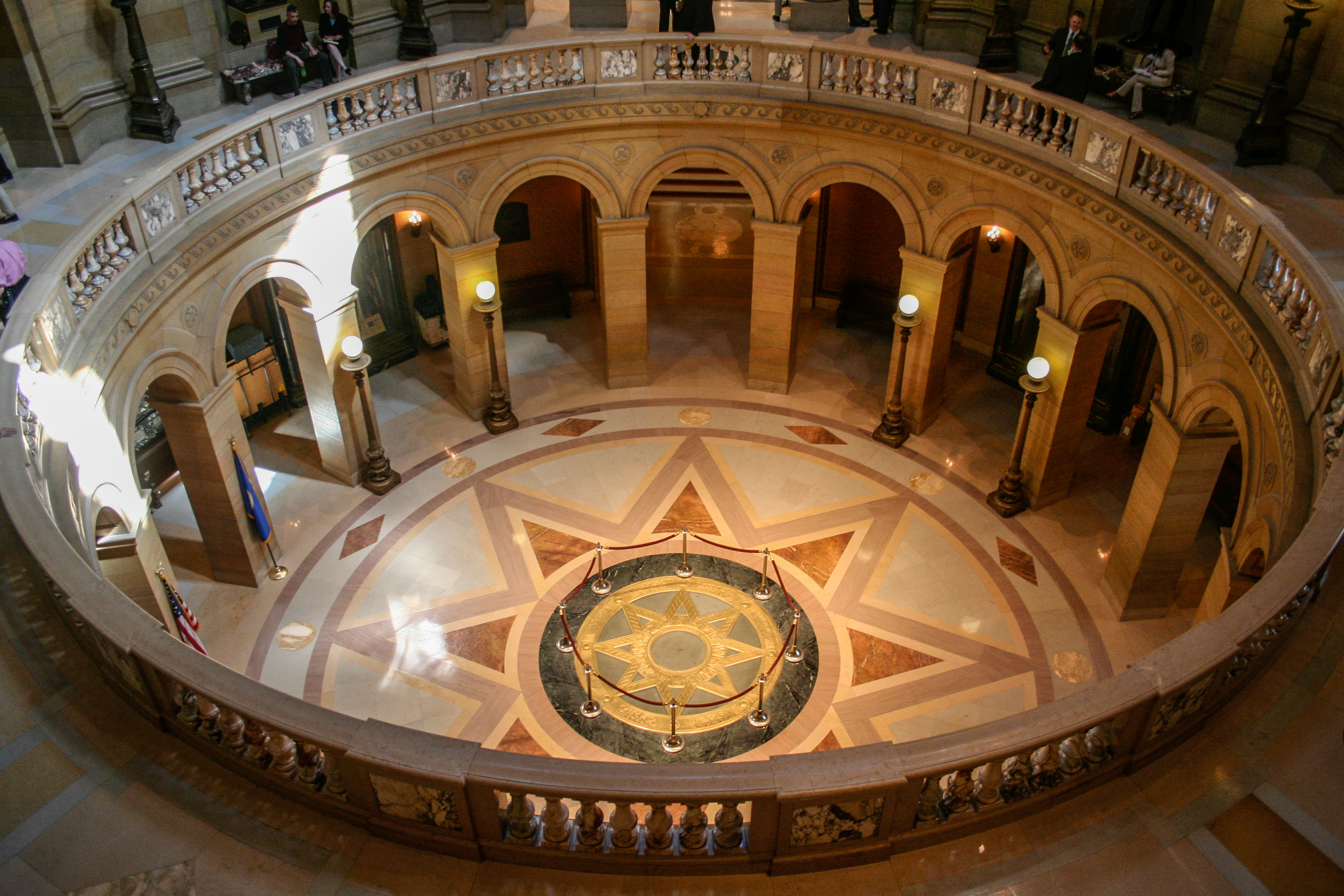
Rotunda

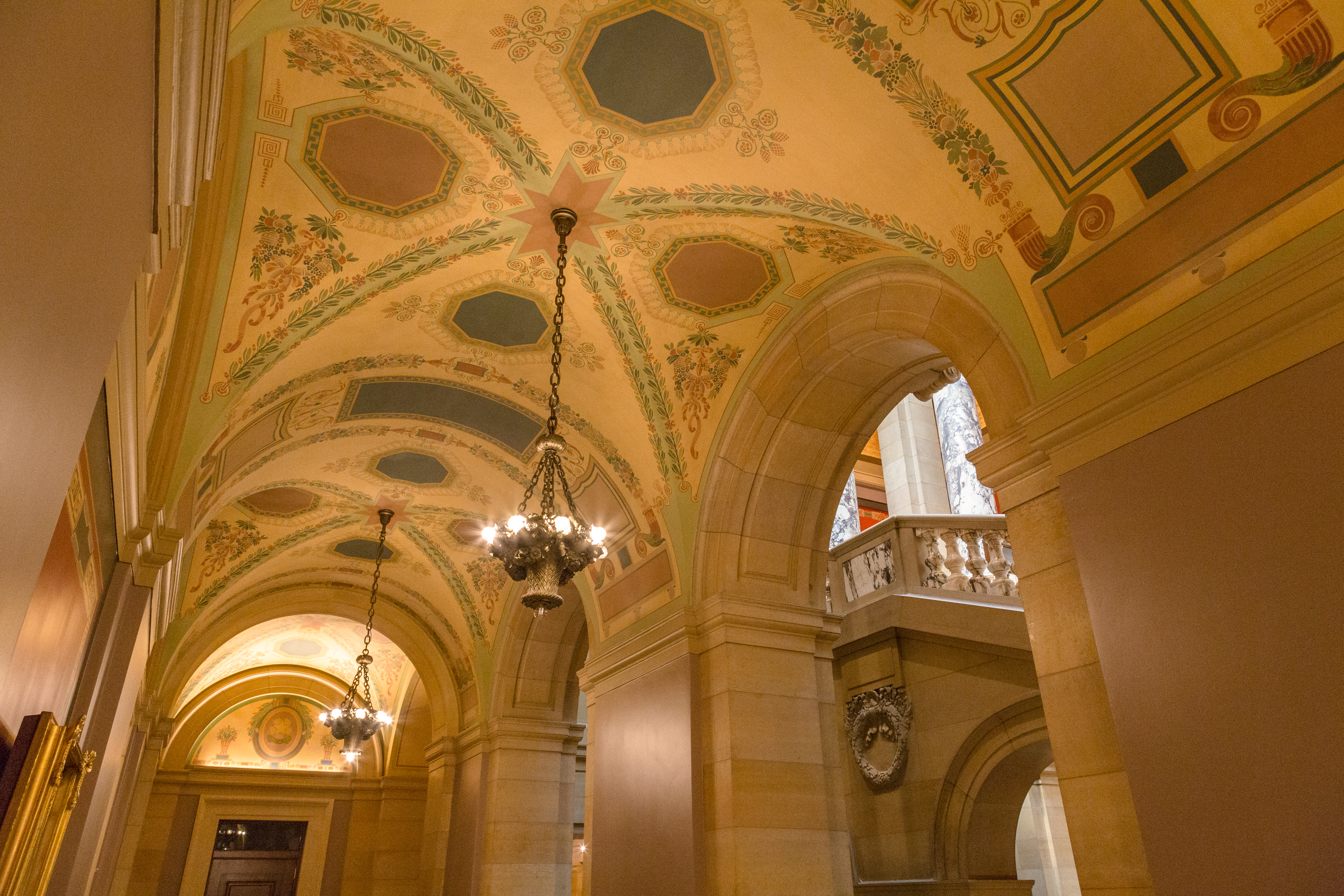
Interior hallway

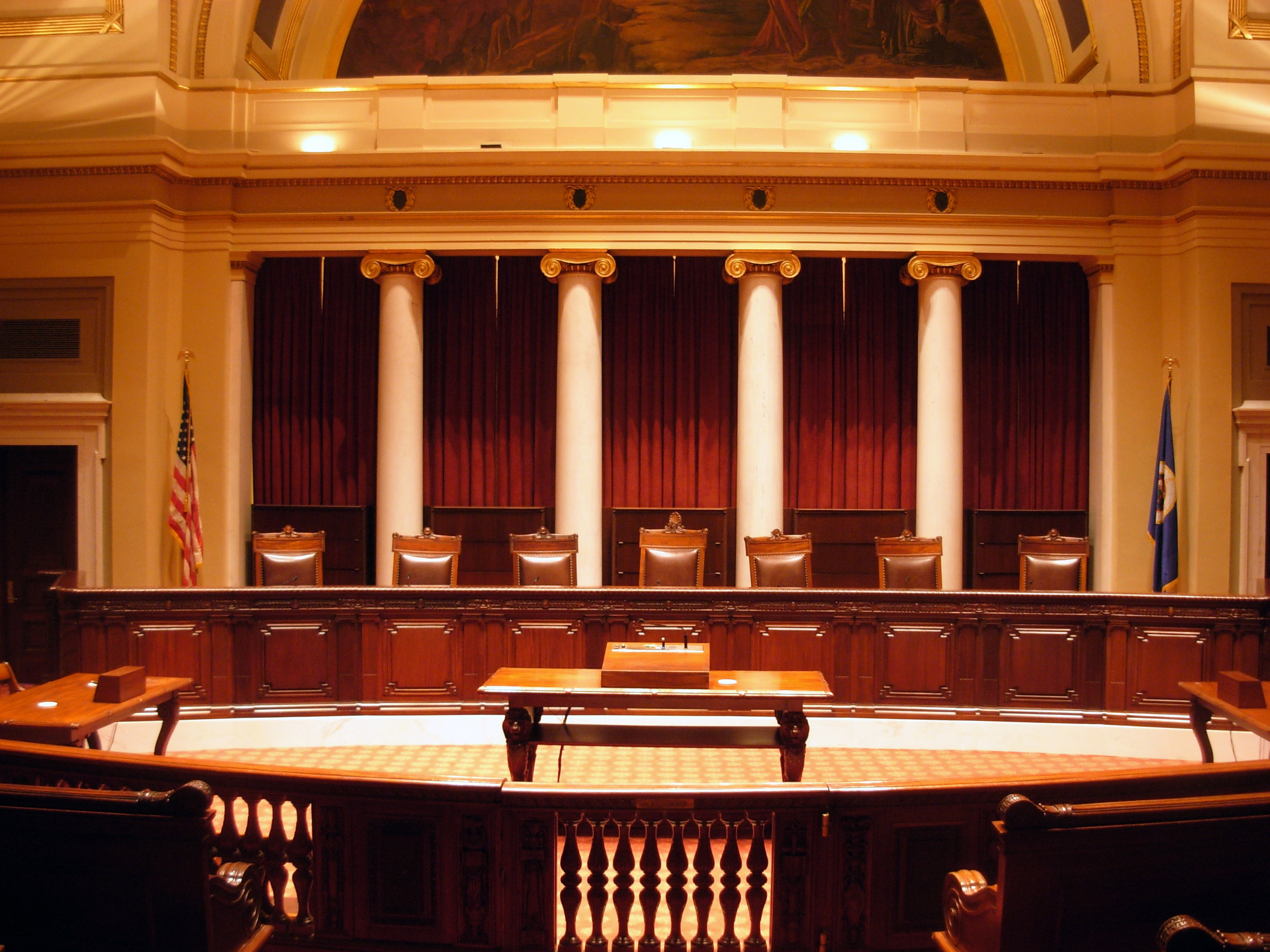
Supreme Court chamber

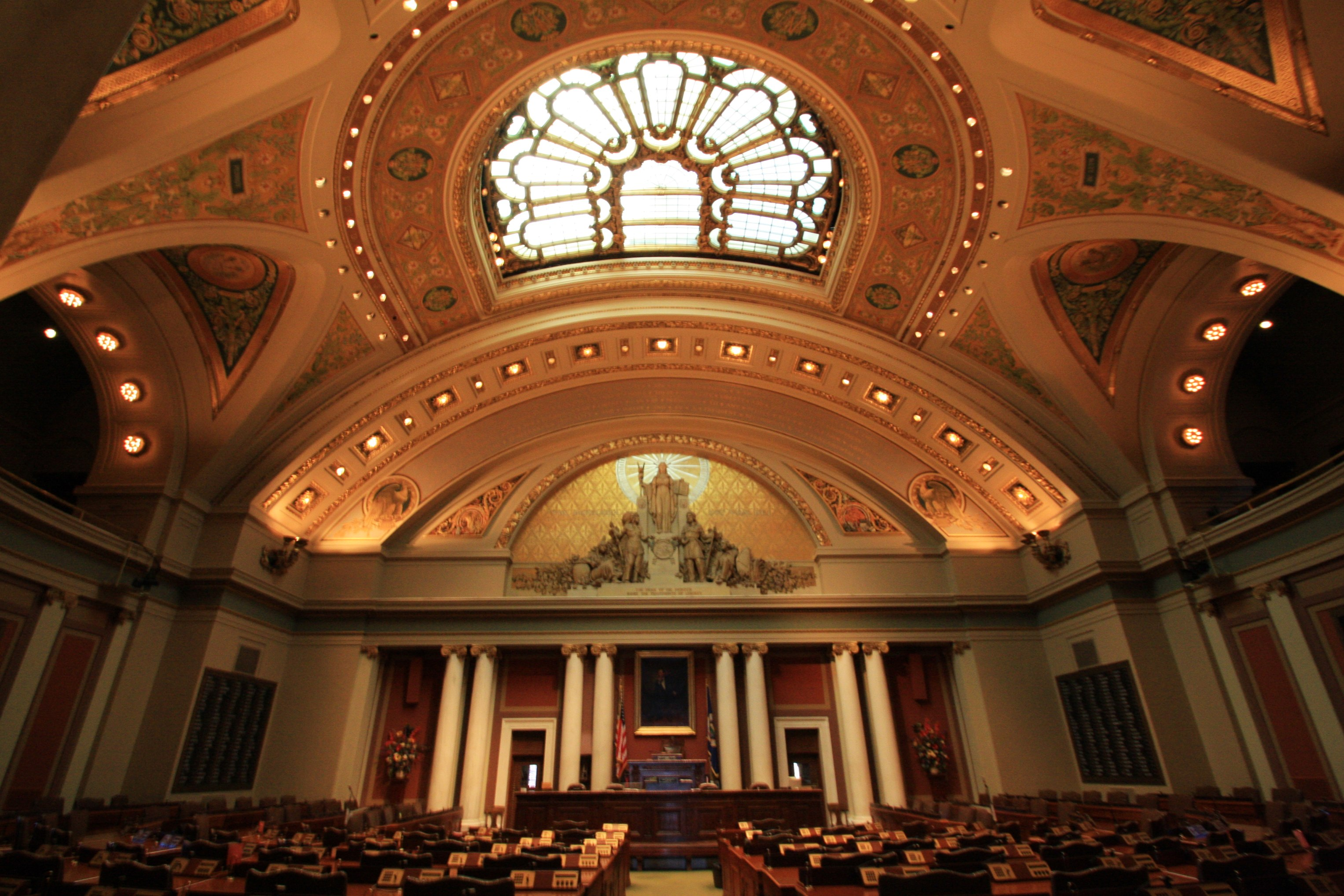
House of Representatives chamber

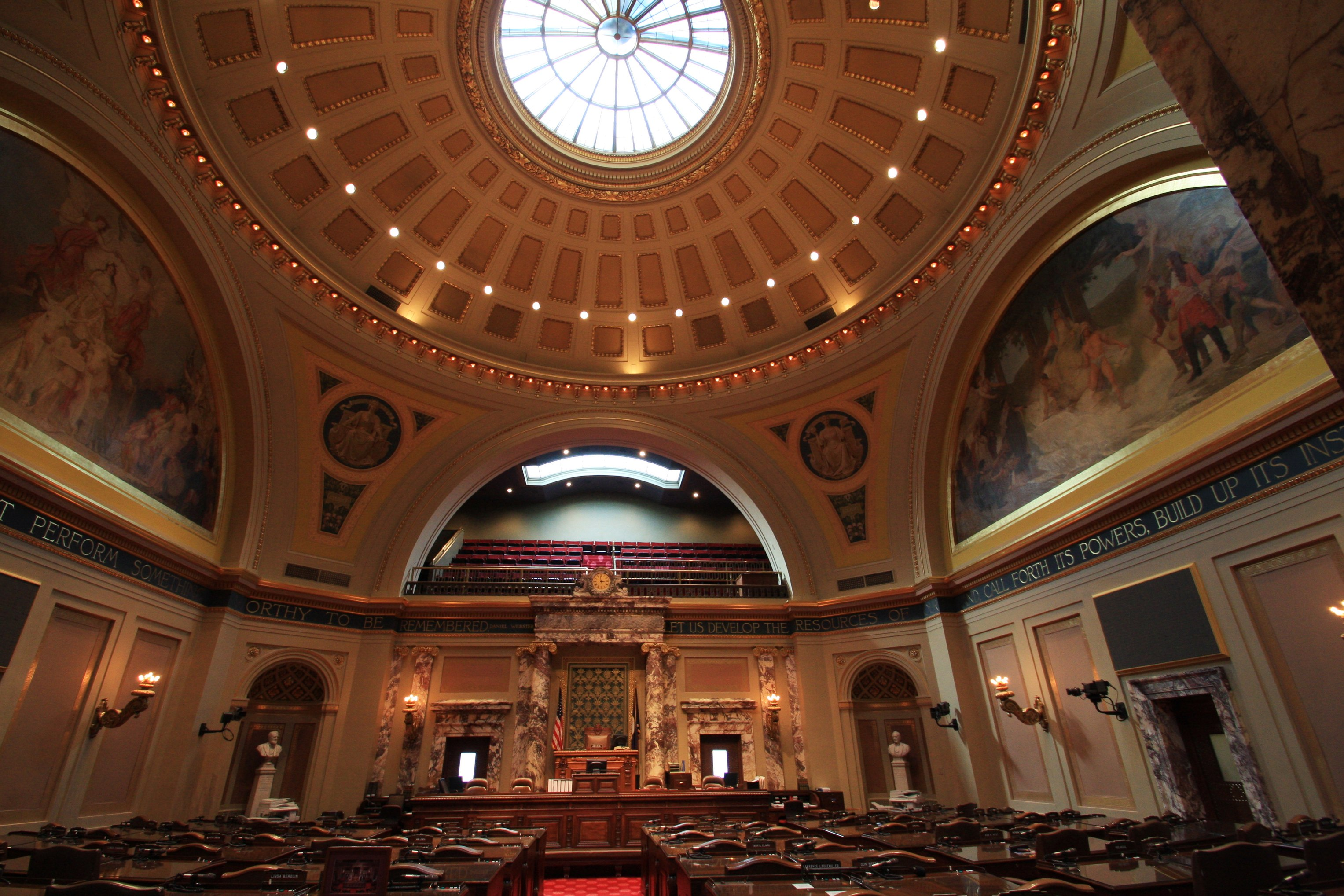
State Senate chamber

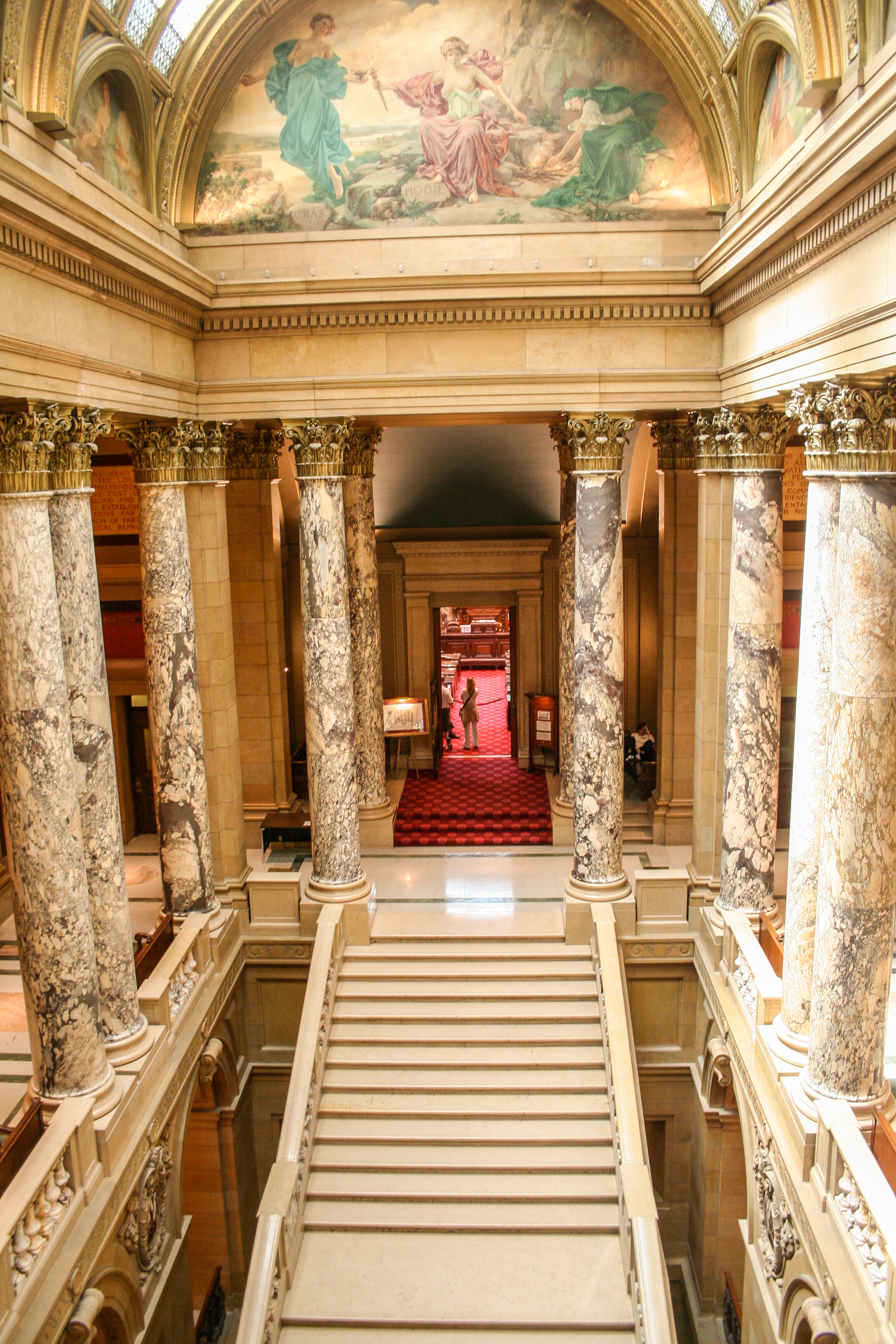
West Wing leading to the Senate chamber

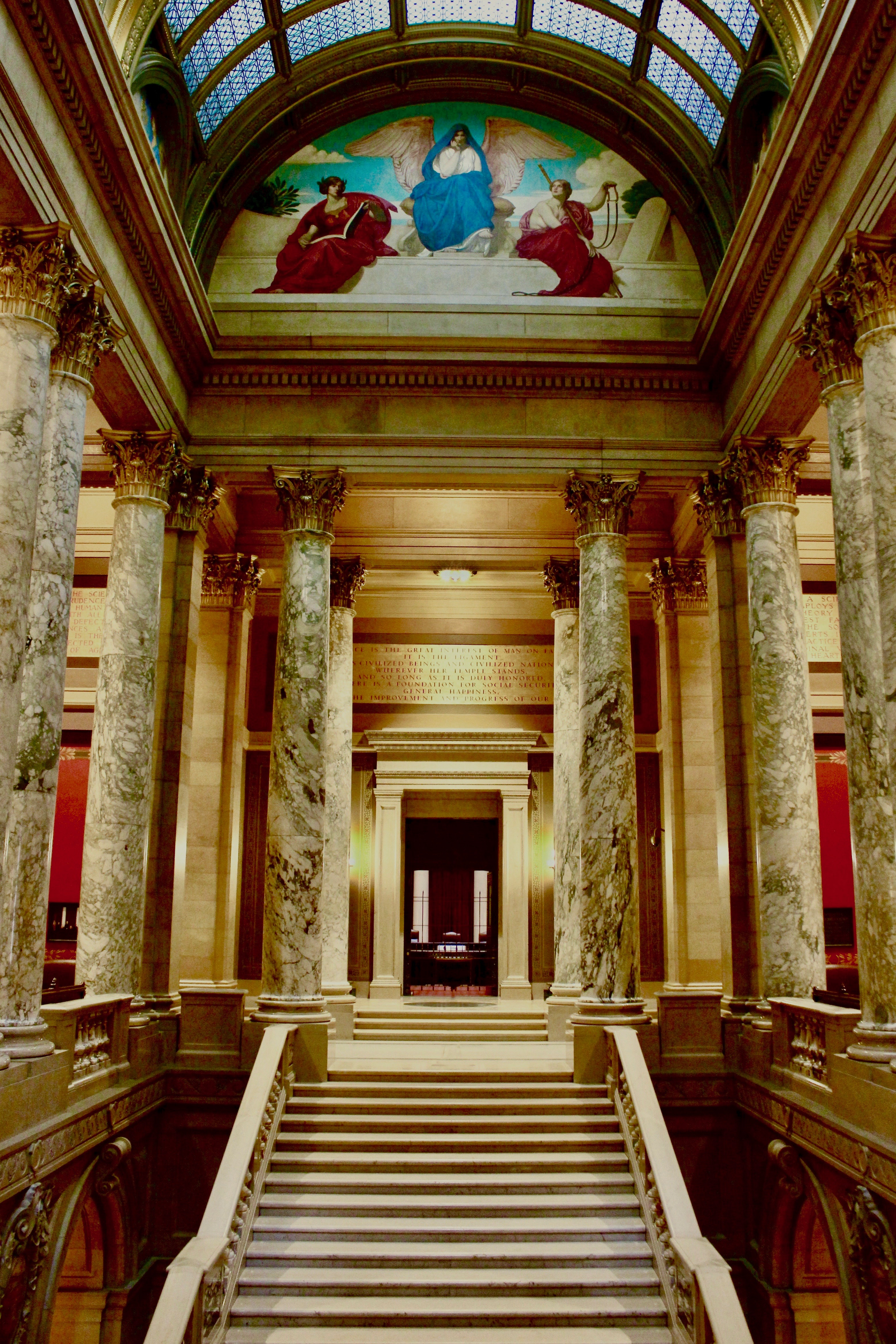
East Wing leading to the Supreme Court Chamber

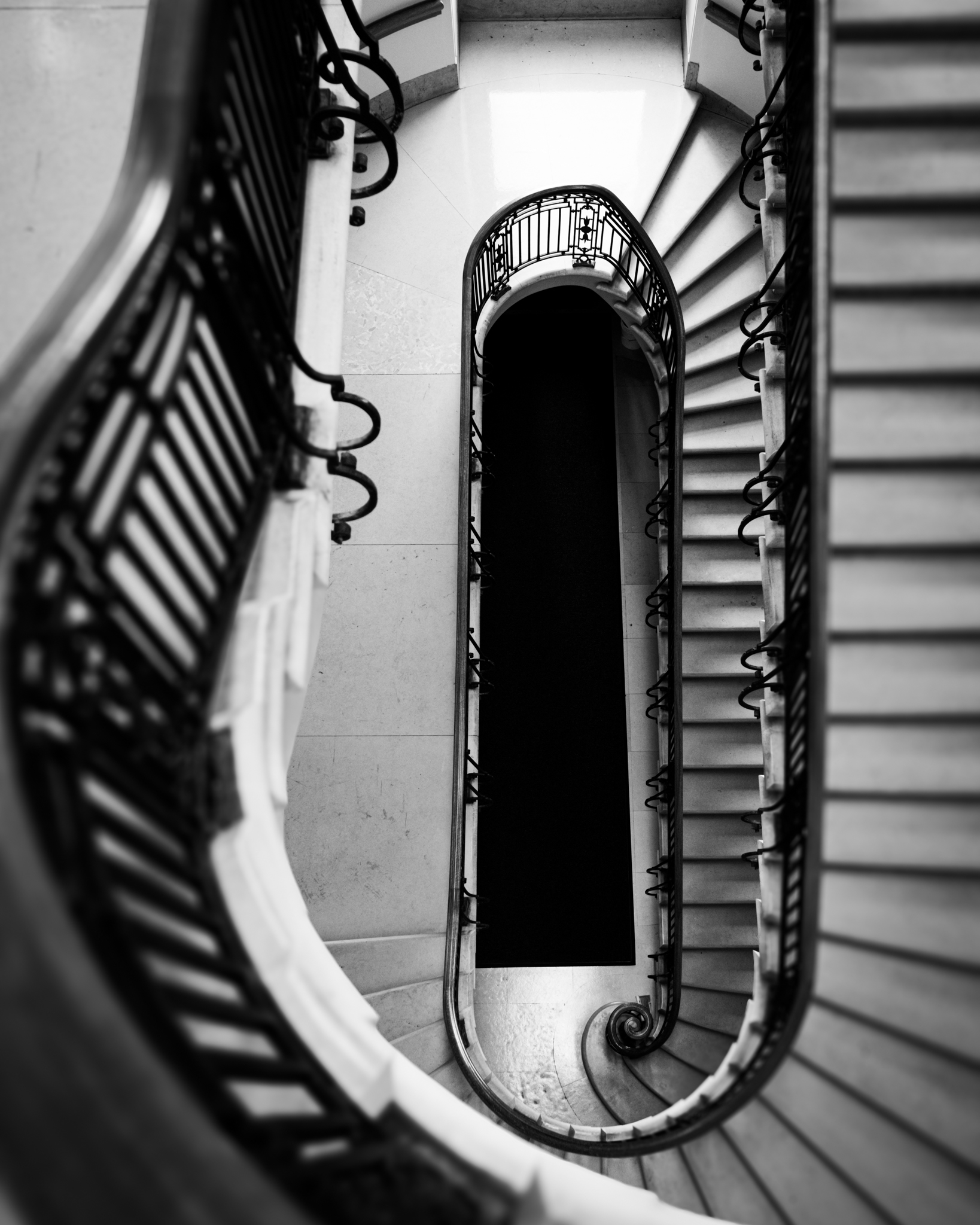
Cantilevered oval staircase

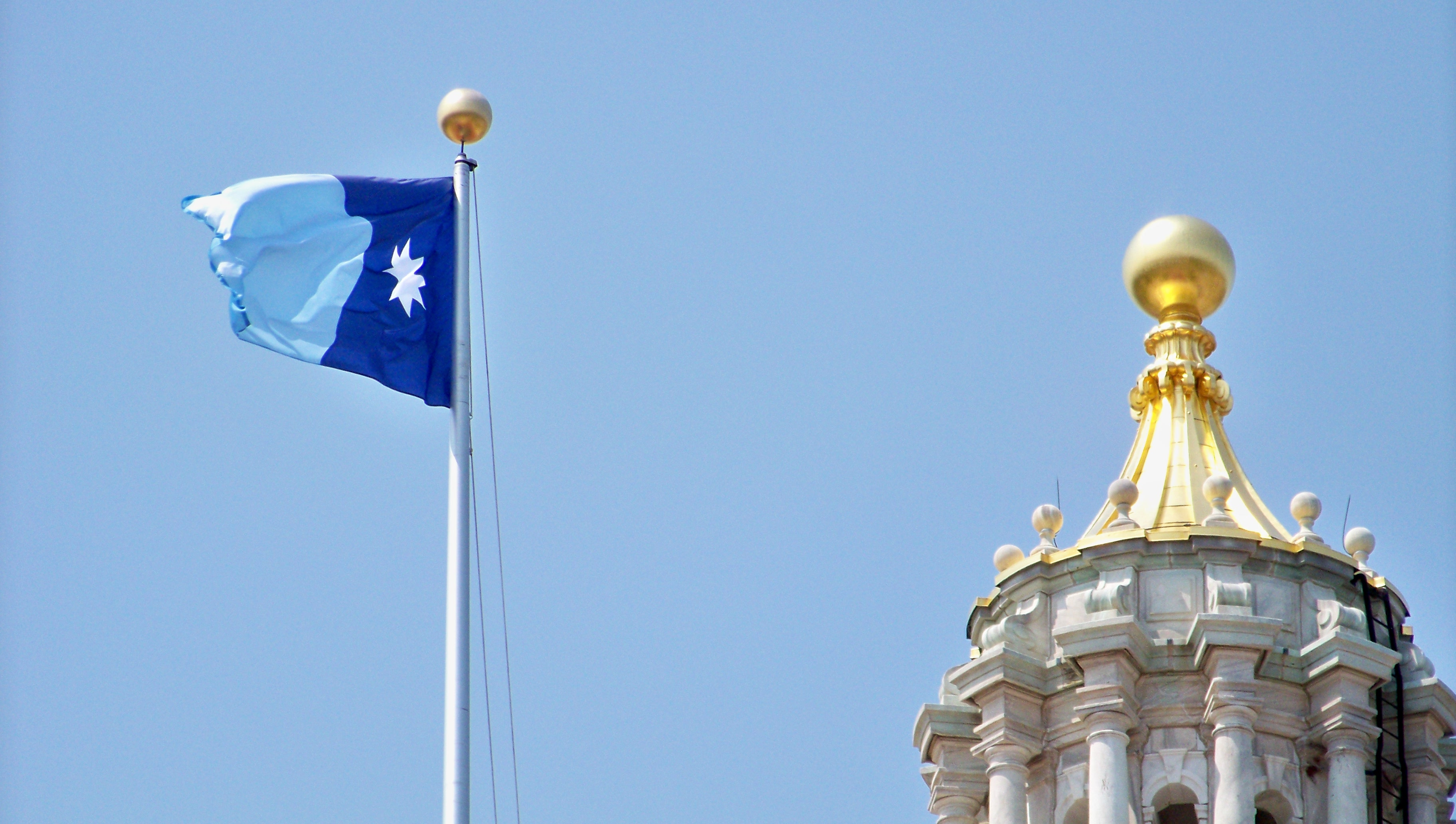
Minnesota flag flying on the eastern flagpole

== See also ==
- List of inscriptions in the Minnesota State Capitol
- Minnesota Governor's Residence
- List of state and territorial capitols in the United States
- Minnesota Legislature
  - List of Minnesota state legislatures
- Governor of Minnesota
