= Martin Luther King School =

Martin Luther King School or similar may refer to:

- Martin Luther King High School (disambiguation)
- Martin Luther King Middle School (disambiguation)
- Lycée Martin Luther King (disambiguation)

== See also ==
- Martin Luther King (disambiguation)
- MLK (disambiguation)
