= Statue of Martin Luther King =

Statue of Martin Luther King or Martin Luther King statue or similar, may refer to:

- Martin Luther King Jr. Memorial (Washington D.C.)
- The Embrace, Boston, Massachusetts
- Statue of Martin Luther King Jr. (Denver), Colorado, USA
- Statue of Martin Luther King Jr. (Pueblo, Colorado), USA
- Statue of Martin Luther King Jr. (Atlanta), Georgia, USA
- Statue of Martin Luther King Jr. (Newark), New Jersey, USA
- Dr. Martin Luther King, Jr. Memorial Sculpture (The Dream), Portland, Oregon, USA
- Statue of Martin Luther King Jr. (Austin, Texas), USA
- Statue of Martin Luther King Jr. (Houston), Texas, USA
- Statue of Martin Luther King Jr. (Milwaukee), Wisconsin, USA
- Statue of Martin Luther King Jr. (Mexico City), Mexico

== See also ==
- Bust of Martin Luther King (disambiguation)
- Martin Luther King (disambiguation)
- MLK (disambiguation)
