= Liberty Plaza =

Liberty Plaza may refer to:

- Liberty Plaza (Atlanta), a public plaza in Atlanta
- Liberty Plaza, Colombo, a shopping mall in Sri Lanka
- Liberty Square (Taipei), a public plaza in Taipei
- Zuccotti Park in New York City, previously known as Liberty Plaza Park

== See also ==
- Liberty Place, Philadelphia, Pennsylvania
