= Bust of Martin Luther King =

Bust of Martin Luther King or Martin Luther King bust or similar, may refer to:

- Bust of Martin Luther King Jr. (U.S. Capitol), Washington, D.C., USA
- Bust of Martin Luther King, Jr. (Jersey City), New Jersey, USA
- Bust of Martin Luther King Jr. (Alston), a bronze bust design by Charles Alston, of which several were cast

== See also ==
- Statue of Martin Luther King (disambiguation)
- Martin Luther King (disambiguation)
- MLK (disambiguation)
