= King High School =

King High School may refer to:

- King College Prep High School in Chicago, Illinois
- King High School (Corpus Christi, Texas), Corpus Christi, Texas
- King High School (Kingsville, Texas), Kingsville, Texas
- King City High School (California), King City, California
- King City High School (Missouri), King City, Missouri
- C. Leon King High School, Tampa, Florida
- Grace King High School, Metairie, Louisiana
- King Philip Regional High School, Wrentham, Massachusetts
- Admiral King High School, Lorain, Ohio
- C. E. King High School, Harris County, Texas
- King George High School, King George, Virginia
- King William High School, King William, Virginia
- Rufus King High School, Milwaukee, Wisconsin

== See also ==
- Martin Luther King High School (disambiguation)
