= Martin Luther (disambiguation) =

Martin Luther (1483–1546) was a German monk and theologian widely identified with the Protestant Reformation.

Martin Luther may also refer to:

- Martin Luther (diplomat) (1895–1945), German diplomat from 1940–1945 and a Nazi party member
- Martin Christian Luther (1883–1963), entrepreneur and politician from Estonia
- Martin Luther (1923 film), a German silent historical film
- Martin Luther (1953 film), a biographical film of the German priest Martin Luther
- Martin Luther (steam locomotive), a historical traction engine in Namibia

== See also ==
- Luther (disambiguation)
- Luther Martin (1748–1826), one of the Founding Fathers of the United States
- Martin Luther Beistle (1875–1935), founder of the Beistle Company
- Martin Luther Church (disambiguation), several churches named after Martin Luther
- Martin Luther College, Minnesota
- Martin Luther King (disambiguation)
- Martin Luther King Jr. (1929–1968), American civil rights activist
- Martin Luther McCoy (born 1970), soul singer, songwriter, musician, producer and actor
- Resources about Martin Luther, a list of works by and about Martin Luther
