= Liberty Plaza (Atlanta) =

Public plaza in Atlanta, Georgia

Coordinates: 33.7485°N 84.3871°W

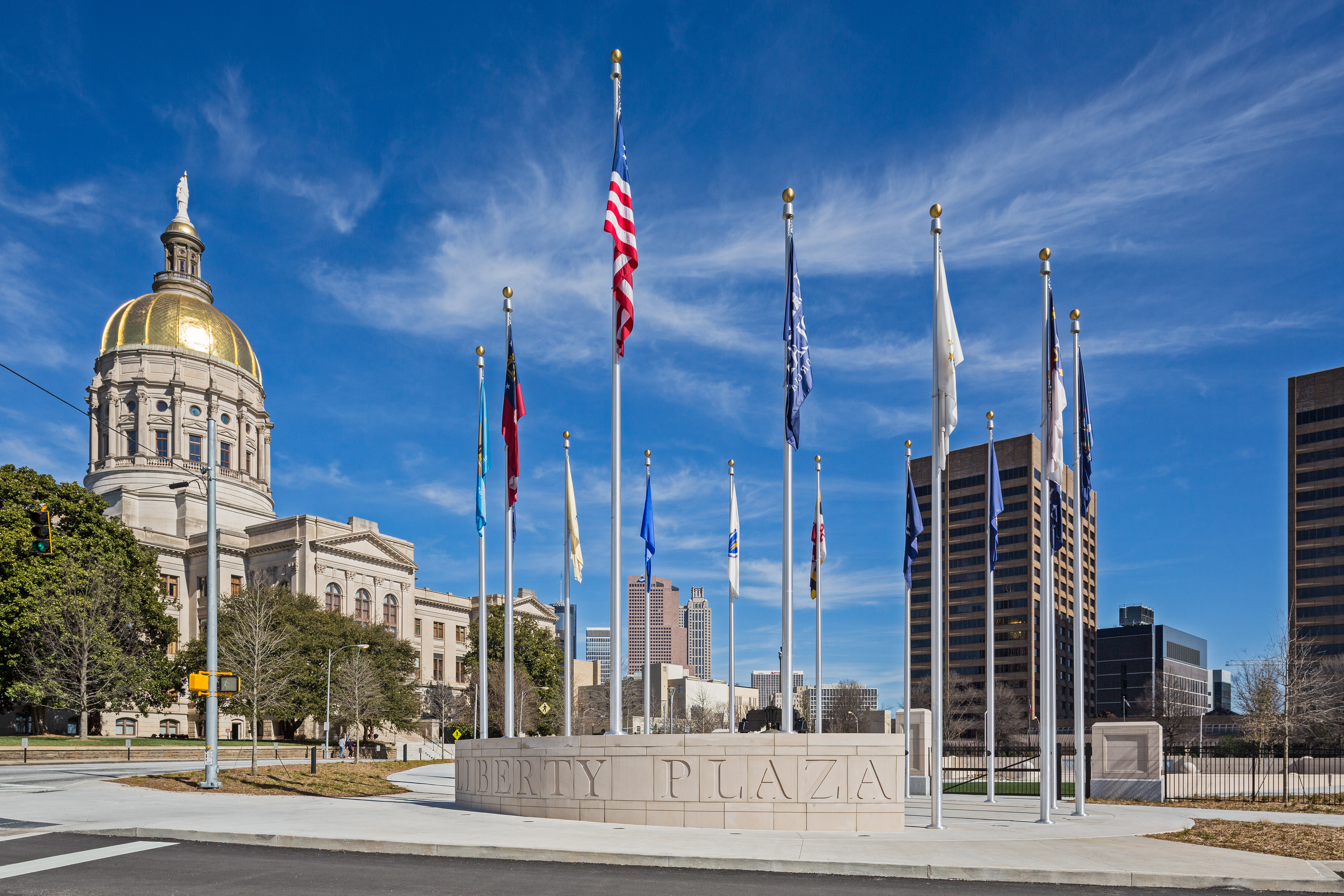
Liberty Plaza, with the Georgia State Capitol in the background. (2015)

Liberty Plaza is a public plaza in downtown Atlanta, Georgia, adjacent to the Georgia State Capitol. Completed in 2015, the 2.2-acre plaza is capable of holding over 3,000 people and has hosted numerous political demonstrations in Atlanta.

== History ==
The idea of a public greenspace near the Georgia State Capitol dates back to 1910, when a tree-lined boulevard approaching the capitol was proposed. This proposal, an example of the City Beautiful movement, was made by Atlanta-based architect Haralson Bleckley and would have seen the Gulch capped by a broad civic plaza extending from the Capitol to Terminal Station. This "Bleckley Plaza Plan" was rejected in 1916, and while it was revived in 1923, 1927, and 1930, all revivals were ultimately also rejected. Other proposals made in 1927, 1932, and 1944 called for a square plaza to be built between the Capitol and Atlanta City Hall, but like the previous proposals, these never came to fruition. Because of the lack of a plaza near the Capitol, most political demonstrations and inaugurations on the Capitol grounds were held near the western entrance of the Capitol on Washington Street, which often caused the road to be closed. Speaking of the lack of a public plaza near the Capitol in 2014, former member of the Georgia State Senate George Hooks said, "Our Capitol has probably the smallest amount of green space of any Capitol I know of in the country.”

=== Modern era ===
In 2008, Steve Fanczi (Deputy Executive Director of the Georgia Building Authority) developed and proposed plans for a public plaza to the east of the State Capitol called "Liberty Plaza". The plans were finally approved in the Fall of 2013 by the Governing Board of the Georgia Building Authority, with a cost of $4.4 million that was raised through the selling of surplus government property. With designs by architectural firm Stevens & Wilkinson, work on the plaza began on June 5, 2014 with the demolition of a 60-year-old parking garage just east of the Capitol. Completed in 2015, the 2.2-acre public plaza includes an 8,000-square-foot grass lawn and is capable of holding over 3,000 people. While Governor Nathan Deal had originally intended for his inauguration to be held at the newly constructed plaza on January 12, 2015, bad weather forced the ceremony to take place inside the Capitol. Several days later on January 16, Deal officially dedicated the plaza. Deal also pledged that a statue of Martin Luther King Jr. would be constructed on the plaza.

== Demonstration venue ==
Notable demonstrations that have occurred at the plaza include the March for Our Lives in 2018, a climate strike in September 2019, and the 2020 Georgia March for Life.

=== Controversy ===
In 2018, a Federal lawsuit was filed by organizers of the March for Our Lives alleging that the requests process for holding a protest on the grounds was unconstitutional. The process required any event held after normal business hours on the grounds to be sponsored by a Constitutional officer of the state, which the organizers stated was a violation of their First Amendment rights. While the organizers were initially unable to receive a sponsorship from any of the Constitutional officers (who at the time, they pointed out, were all Republicans), Governor Nathan Deal eventually agreed to sponsor the protest. In response to this incident, the ACLU of Georgia sent a letter to the Georgia Building Authority (which operates the plaza) urging them to amend their policies regarding permits for holding political rallies and protests at the location.

== Statues and reproductions ==
The plaza houses model reproductions of the Liberty Bell and the Statue of Liberty that were previously held elsewhere on the Capitol grounds. Surrounding the Liberty Bell is a ring of 13 state flags from the original Thirteen Colonies, as well as the U.S. flag and Liberty Plaza flag. A statue of Martin Luther King Jr. overlooking the plaza was unveiled on August 28, 2017, the 54th anniversary of King's I Have a Dream speech.

== See also ==
- Lawyers Mall, the greenspace in front of the Maryland State House
- Minnesota State Capitol Mall
- Capitol Grounds on Capitol Square, surrounding the Ohio Statehouse
- Capitol Mall, which borders the California State Capitol

== Bibliography ==
- "The ACLU of Georgia Urges the State Building Authority to End Government Censorship of Liberty Plaza". American Civil Liberties Union. March 13, 2018.
- Blau, Max (March 28, 2016). "These 26 projects will radically transform Memorial Drive". Atlanta.
- Bluestein, Greg (January 12, 2015a). "Four keys to Nathan Deal's inaugural speech". The Atlanta Journal-Constitution. Cox Enterprises.
- Bluestein, Greg (January 16, 2015b). "State opens Liberty Plaza across from Capitol". The Atlanta Journal-Constitution. Cox Enterprises.
- Bluestein, Greg (August 28, 2017). "Long time coming: MLK statue unveiled at Georgia Capitol". The Atlanta Journal-Constitution. Cox Enterprises.
- Bluestein, Greg (March 12, 2018a). "Federal lawsuit targets Georgia policy blocking gun control protest". The Atlanta Journal-Constitution. Cox Enterprises.
- Bluestein, Greg (March 13, 2018b). "Georgia governor OKs gun rally after lawsuit targeted event policy". The Atlanta Journal-Constitution. Cox Enterprises.
- "Annual Georgia March for Life Tomorrow". Christian News Wire. January 21, 2020.
- Galloway, Jim (March 13, 2018). "Yes, think how strange it sounds: Permission granted to assemble, speak freely at Liberty Plaza". The Atlanta Journal-Constitution. Cox Enterprises.
- "Liberty Plaza: A hundred years in the making". Georgia Building Authority. Government of Georgia. August 15, 2016. Archived from the original on February 1, 2020.
- "Liberty Plaza". Georgia Building Authority. Government of Georgia. Archived from the original on January 30, 2020.
- Ikeda, Emilie (September 20, 2019). "Hundreds flood Georgia State Capitol steps in climate strike". WAGA-TV.
- Johnston, Andy (March 14, 2015). "Q&A on the News". The Atlanta Journal-Constitution. Cox Enterprises.
- Kelley, Collin (January 16, 2015). "Liberty Plaza opens across from State Capitol". Atlanta INtown Paper.
- Lands, LeeAnn (2009). The Culture of Property: Race, Class, and Housing Landscapes in Atlanta, 1880-1950. University of Georgia Press. ISBN 978-0-8203-3392-2 – via Google Books.
- Martinez, Courtney (March 24, 2018). "March for Our Lives Atlanta: How the march unfolded on social media". The Atlanta Journal-Constitution. Cox Enterprises.
- Morrison, Jeffrey (2019). Atlanta Underground: History from Below. Rowman & Littlefield. ISBN 978-1-4930-4371-2 – via Google Books.
- Pronechen, Joseph (January 10, 2020). "Standing for the Unborn, State by State: Where to Witness to Life Around Nation". National Catholic Register. EWTN.
- Salzer, James (April 26, 2014a). "Remake of Capitol Hill includes new, 'Liberty Plaza'". The Atlanta Journal-Constitution. Cox Enterprises.
- Salzer, James (November 29, 2014b). "Liberty Plaza taking shape for governor's inauguration". The Atlanta Journal-Constitution. Cox Enterprises.
- Salzer, James (July 27, 2015). "Six months after it opens, Liberty Plaza needs a $12,000 sod-lift". The Atlanta Journal-Constitution. Cox Enterprises.
- Salzer, James (January 26, 2016). "State of Georgia gives Liberty Plaza lawn a $1,000 dye job". The Atlanta Journal-Constitution. Cox Enterprises.
- Taylor, Travis Swann (January 16, 2020). "Atlanta's Liberty Plaza". wanderlust ATLANTA.
- "Liberty Plaza work begins". The Atlanta Journal-Constitution. Cox Enterprises. June 5, 2014.
- "Plans for Liberty Plaza at the State Capitol". The Atlanta Journal-Constitution. Cox Enterprises.
- "Deal's inauguration set for Jan. 12 in Atlanta". The Covington News. December 1, 2014.
- Wells, Myrydd (August 28, 2017). "Georgia Capitol's Martin Luther King Jr. statue unveiled on 54th anniversary of "I Have a Dream"". Atlanta.
- Williams, Dave (January 9, 2015). "New plaza makes more space for 'liberty'". Atlanta Business Chronicle. American City Business Journals.
- "Henry County man to sculpt MLK statue for Ga. Capitol". WXIA-TV. June 30, 2015.
