= Lycée Martin Luther King (Bussy-Saint-Georges) =

Senior high school in France

Lycée Martin Luther King is a senior high school in Bussy-Saint-Georges, Seine-et-Marne, France, in the Paris metropolitan area.

It is one of at least three schools in France named for slain U.S. civil rights leader Martin Luther King Jr.
