= Bleckley Plaza Plan =

Proposed engineering project in Atlanta

The Bleckley Plaza Plan was a proposed engineering project in Atlanta, Georgia, United States. Proposed by architect Haralson Bleckley in the early 1900s, the project would have seen numerous railroads in downtown Atlanta covered by a large public plaza that would have run from the Georgia State Capitol to Terminal Station, covering much of The Gulch. The project, while considered at numerous points in the early 1900s, never came to fruition.

== History ==
The plan for a large plaza was created by Atlanta-based architect Haralson Bleckley in the early 1900s. The impetus behind the plan came in 1906 at a meeting of the Atlanta chapter of the American Institute of Architects (AIA) where the members declared the railroad tracks running between Forsyth Street and Central Avenue in downtown Atlanta were an eyesore that required fixing. The following year, Bleckley, an AIA member, reported back to the chapter with an extensive plan to cover the railroad tracks in downtown with a system of parks and high-rise buildings, raising the street level in the process. Railroads that would be covered as part of the plan included the Central of Georgia Railroad, the Georgia Railroad, and the Western and Atlantic Railroad. This plan, emblematic of the City Beautiful movement of the time, would have included the Georgia State Capitol on the eastern end of the plaza, new public buildings along the north and south sides of the plaza, and a newly constructed French Renaissance skyscraper at the western end that would have housed a city hall, railroad depot, and municipal offices. The plan was discussed in the local newspapers at the time, including The Atlanta Journal and The Atlanta Constitution in 1909.

The plan was reviewed and endorsed by the Atlanta chapter in 1910. That same year, the Atlanta Chamber of Commerce partnered with the Atlanta Real Estate Board to form a Planning Commission for the purposes of seeing Bleckley's plan come to fruition. Along with the Chamber of Commerce, the plan was endorsed by many prominent Atlanta citizens and by property owners who owned land near the railroad tracks. However, the project was opposed by the railroad owners, whose grants had placed the railroad tracks on street level, and by the government of Georgia, which owned the Western and Atlantic Railroad and felt that their air rights were valuable. For several years, the project remained stalled.

The project gained traction in 1916, when Atlanta mayor James G. Woodward created a Plaza Planning Commission to review the proposal. On May 3, the commission asked the Atlanta City Council to conduct an engineering study of the plan. On July 8, the architectural firm Barclay, Parsons, and Klapp presented their findings on the cost of the project and the creation of a new Union Station. The study was endorsed by the city council and the chamber of commerce, and was submitted to the Western and Atlantic Railroad Commission for their consideration. However, on June 27, 1917, the railroad commission recommended to the Georgia General Assembly that they not approve the plaza plan. Following this, the plaza plan was considered dead.

== Future projects ==
Following the rejection of the plaza plan, Atlanta mayor Asa Griggs Candler created a commission to study the creation of viaducts in Atlanta. This led to the creation of numerous viaducts of Atlanta throughout the 1920s. The chamber of commerce would revive the idea for a public plaza covering the railroad gulch several times in the following decades, including in 1923, 1927, and 1930, though none of these plans lead to the creation of the plaza. Between 1928 and 1936, the city continued to expand its viaduct system, and in 1949, Plaza Park, a small public park, was opened near the proposed site of the plaza. Furthermore, a new Union Station was constructed in 1930 near the location Bleckley had proposed, though much smaller in scale. The idea for a plaza near the capitol building was later revived as Liberty Plaza, which was completed in 2016.

== Bibliography ==
- Bluestein, Greg (September 24, 2016). "State opens Liberty Plaza across from Capitol". The Atlanta Journal-Constitution. Cox Enterprises.
- Garrett, Franklin M. (1969). Atlanta and Environs: A Chronicle of Its People and Events, 1880s-1930s. Vol. II. University of Georgia Press. ISBN 978-0-8203-3905-4 – via Google Books.
- Hoffman, Phillip (September 1968). "Creating Underground Atlanta, 1898–1932". Atlanta Historical Bulletin. XIII (3). Atlanta Historical Society – via Atlanta History Center.
- Lands, LeeAnn (2009). The Culture of Property: Race, Class, and Housing Landscapes in Atlanta, 1880-1950. University of Georgia Press. ISBN 978-0-8203-4223-8 – via Google Books.
- Morgan, Thos. H. (June 1937). "Reminiscences of the Architecture and Architects of Atlanta". Atlanta Historical Bulletin. II (10). Atlanta Historical Society – via Atlanta History Center.
- Morgan, Thomas H. (September 1943). "The Georgia Chapter of the American Institute of Architects". Atlanta Historical Bulletin. VII (28). Atlanta Historical Society – via Atlanta History Center.
- Morrison, Jeffrey (2019). Atlanta Underground: History from Below. Globe Pequot Press. ISBN 978-1-4930-4371-2 – via Google Books.
- Salzer, James (May 20, 2014). "Remake of Capitol Hill includes new, 'Liberty Plaza'". The Atlanta Journal-Constitution. Cox Enterprises.
