= Martin Luther King Middle School =

Martin Luther King Middle School is the name of these public school in the United States:

- Martin Luther King Middle School (Berkeley)
- Martin Luther King Middle School (Kansas City)
- Martin Luther King Jr. Middle School, in Richmond, Virginia
- Martin Luther King Jr. Middle School (Germantown, MD)
- Martin Luther King Jr. Middle School, part of Hayward Unified School District in Hayward, California

== See also ==
- Martin Luther King (disambiguation)
- Lycée Martin Luther King (disambiguation) for schools France named after King
- Martin Luther King High School (disambiguation)
