= Martin Luther Church =

Marten Luther Church can refer to:

- Martin Luther Church (Halmstad), Sweden
- Martin Luther Church (Paramaribo), Suriname
- Martin Luther Cathedral, Daugavpils, Latvia
