= Lycée Martin Luther King =

Lycée Martin Luther King may refer to:

- Lycée Martin Luther King (Bussy-Saint-Georges)
- Lycée Martin Luther King in Lyon
- Lycée Martin Luther King in Narbonne
- Lycée d'enseignement adapté Martin Luther King in Asnières-sur-Seine

== See also ==
- Martin Luther King (disambiguation)
- Martin Luther King High School (disambiguation) for high schools in the United States named after King
- Martin Luther King Middle School (disambiguation)
