= Statue of Martin Luther King Jr. (Atlanta) =

Public monument in Atlanta, Georgia

Martin Luther King Jr. statue
- Location: Georgia State Capitol, Atlanta, Georgia
- Coordinates: 33°44′57″N 84°23′15″W
- Designer: Martin Dawe
- Type: Statue
- Material: Bronze; Granite (pedestal)
- Height: 8 ft (2.4 m) (plus 3 ft (0.91 m) pedestal)
- Dedicated date: August 28, 2017
- Dedicated to: Martin Luther King Jr.

The Martin Luther King Jr. statue is a public monument of civil rights activist Martin Luther King Jr. in Atlanta, Georgia. The statue, designed by Martin Dawe, was unveiled in 2017 and stands on the grounds of the Georgia State Capitol, overlooking Liberty Plaza.

== History ==
=== Background ===
In February 2014, Georgia Governor Nathan Deal signed an act to create a statue of Martin Luther King Jr. that would reside on the grounds of the Georgia State Capitol in Atlanta. In January the following year, Deal appointed State Representatives Calvin Smyre and Joe Wilkinson to serve as liaisons with the King family for the creation of the statue. Later that year, sculptor Andy Davis of McDonough, Georgia was selected to design the statue, with an estimated timeline of six to seven months and a budget of $350,000. Under a Georgia law passed the previous year, no public funds would be allocated for the statue, with the monument's cost being covered through private funding. Davis planned to have the statue completed by Martin Luther King Jr. Day in January 2016. However, the project was put on hold following Davis's unexpected death in a motorcycle crash in July 2015. Prior to his death, Davis had completed several sketches for the statue which were well received.

In June 2016, Atlanta artist Martin Dawe was selected to create the statue. Dawe based his design of King off of a picture of King walking with Bayard Rustin during the Montgomery bus boycott. Dawe stated that he was concerned with making King look too stern, and instead opted to show him "stepping off", suggesting "a beginning and a hopefulness." Completed in 2017, Smyre stated that the final cost for the project was $300,000. The cost was covered by funding from the Georgia Building Authority, The Coca-Cola Company, the Atlanta Apartment Association, and the Department of Community Affairs’ Martin Luther King Jr. Advisory Council.

=== Name controversy ===
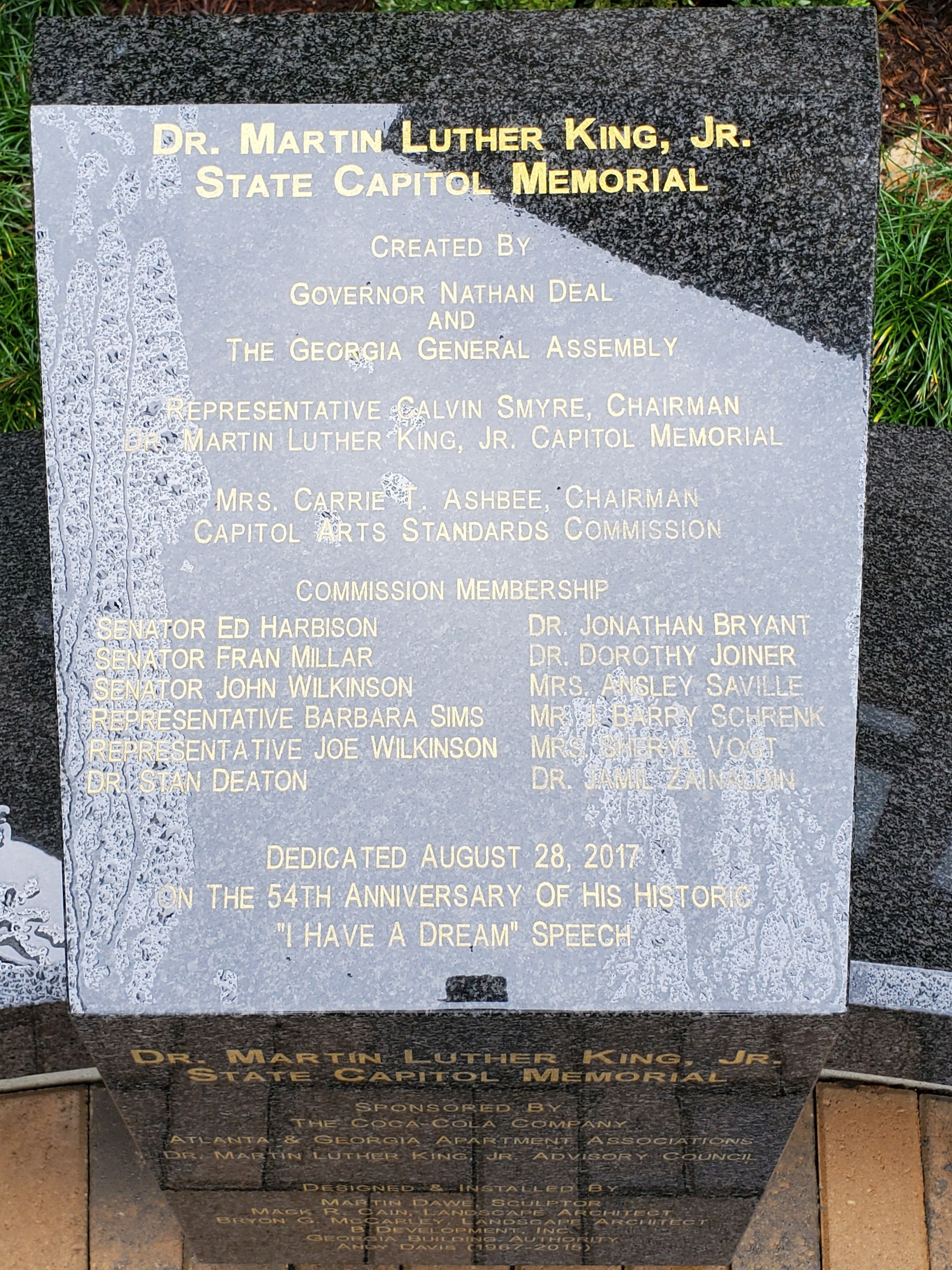
Marker near the statue, with Tommy Benton's name absent

Leading up to the statue's unveiling, State Representative Tommy Benton elicited controversy related to the statue. As a member of the Capitol Arts Standards Commission, Benton's name would have appeared on a plaque near the statue along with all other members of the commission, but shortly before the plaque's creation, he asked that his name be removed entirely from the plaque. In 2014, Benton had been one of three Republicans in the Georgia House of Representatives to vote against the creation of the statue, and he stated that it would be "hypocritical" to have his name included on a statue he had voted against. Benton had previously come under controversy over comments regarding the Ku Klux Klan and the role that slavery played in the origins of the American Civil War. Southern Christian Leadership Conference president Charles Steele Jr. opined that Benton's name should be included if he "believe(d) in freedom and justice".

=== Dedication ===
The monument was unveiled on August 28, 2017, on the 54th anniversary of King's "I Have a Dream" speech. Multiple public officials and several members of King's family were present at the dedication, though King's sons Martin Luther King III and Dexter King were notably absent. Notable attendees and speakers at the event included Governor Deal, Lieutenant Governor Casey Cagle, Atlanta Mayor Kasim Reed, First Lady Sandra Deal, Bernice King, and Christine King Farris. The statue was officially unveiled following the tolling of the Liberty Bell replica in nearby Liberty Plaza. The statue marks the second time King has been honored with a physical presence on the Capitol grounds, following the unveiling of an oil portrait of King in the Capitol in 1974.

== Design ==
The statue is made of bronze and rests atop a granite pedestal with the initials "MLK" engraved on its front in gold. The statue itself stands 8 feet (2.4 m), with the pedestal adding an additional 3 feet (0.91 m) to the monument. The statue faces east, overlooking Liberty Plaza and Martin Luther King Jr. Drive. A Korean War memorial was previously located on this site, but was removed shortly before the creation of the statue.

== See also ==
- 2017 in art
- Civil rights movement in popular culture
- Memorials to Martin Luther King Jr.
