= Minnesota State Capitol Mall =

Green space in St. Paul, Minnesota, USA

Coordinates: 44°57′13″N 93°6′8″W

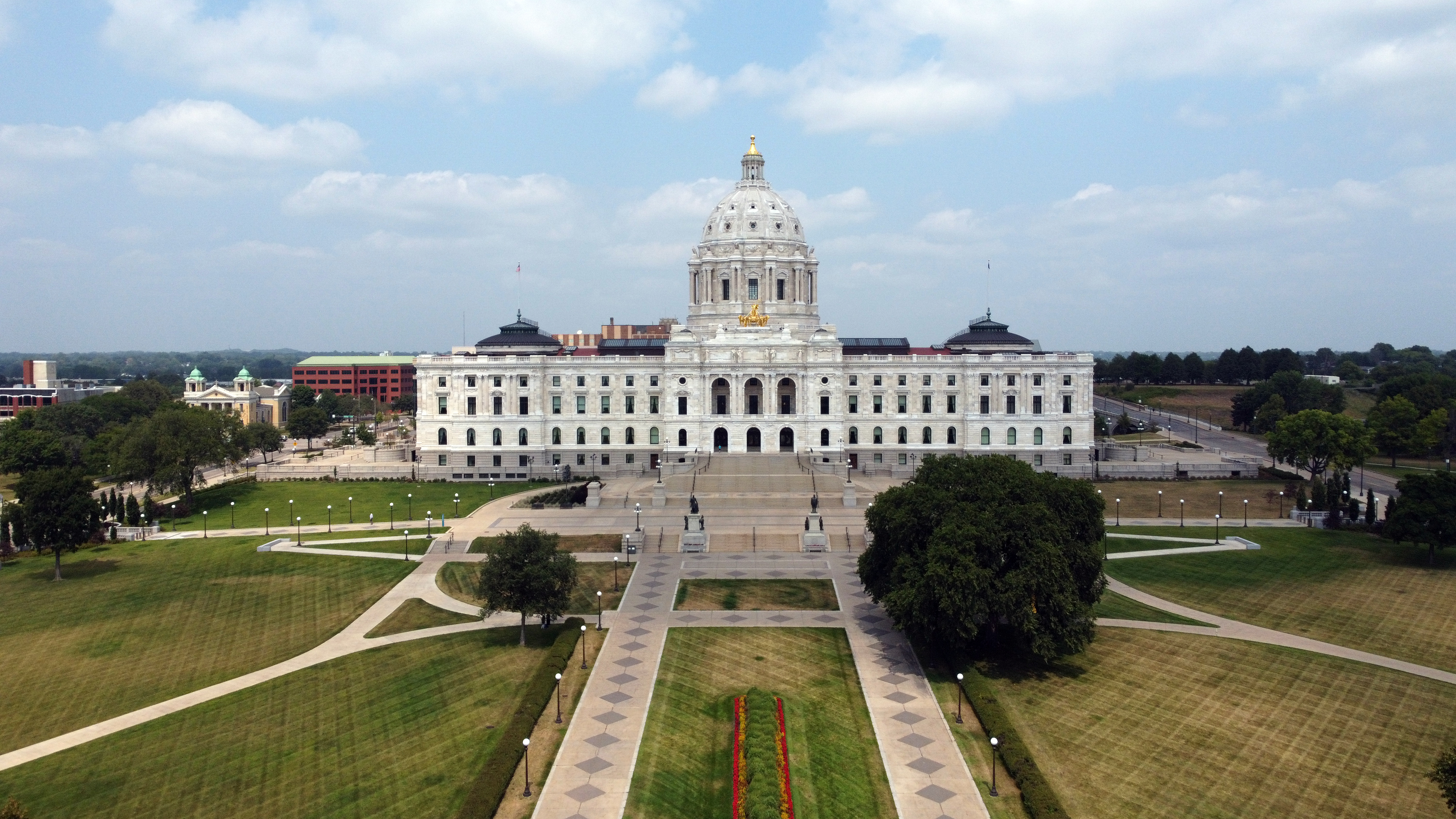
Capitol building with mall in foreground

Map with Key: 1. Leif Erikson; 2. Quadriga: Progress of the State; 3. Judicial Plaza; 4. Floyd B. Olson – Governor during depression years; 5. John Johnson – 1st Governor born in state; 6. Knute Nelson: 1st foreign born Governor; 7. Hubert H. Humphrey; 8. The Women's Suffrage Memorial Garden; 9. Charles Lindbergh: The Boy and the Man; 10. Roy Wilkins Memorial; 11. Laos Special Forces Memorial; 12. MN Vietnam Memorial; 13. Court of Honor; 14. Korean War Veterans Memorial; 15. MN Workers Memorial; 16. Military Family Tribute; 17. MN World War II Veterans Memorial; 18. Fallen Firefighters Memorial; 19. Medal of Honor Memorial; 20. Medal of Honor Memorial|Promise of Youth; 21. U.S.S. Ward Gun; 22. The Peace Officers Memorial; 23. Earthbound; 24. Liberty Bell; A. Christopher Columbus Memorial (pedestal)

The Minnesota State Capitol Mall includes eighteen acres of green space. Over the years, monuments, and memorials, have been added to the mall. The mall has been called Minnesota's Front lawn and is a place where the public has gathered for celebrations, to party, to demonstrate and protest, and to grieve.

The mall is overseen by the Capitol Area Architectural and Planning Board (CAAPB), a small state agency consisting of twelve members, with responsibilities to preserve and enhance the dignity, beauty, and architectural integrity of the capitol, the buildings adjacent to it, the capitol grounds, and the capitol area.

== History ==
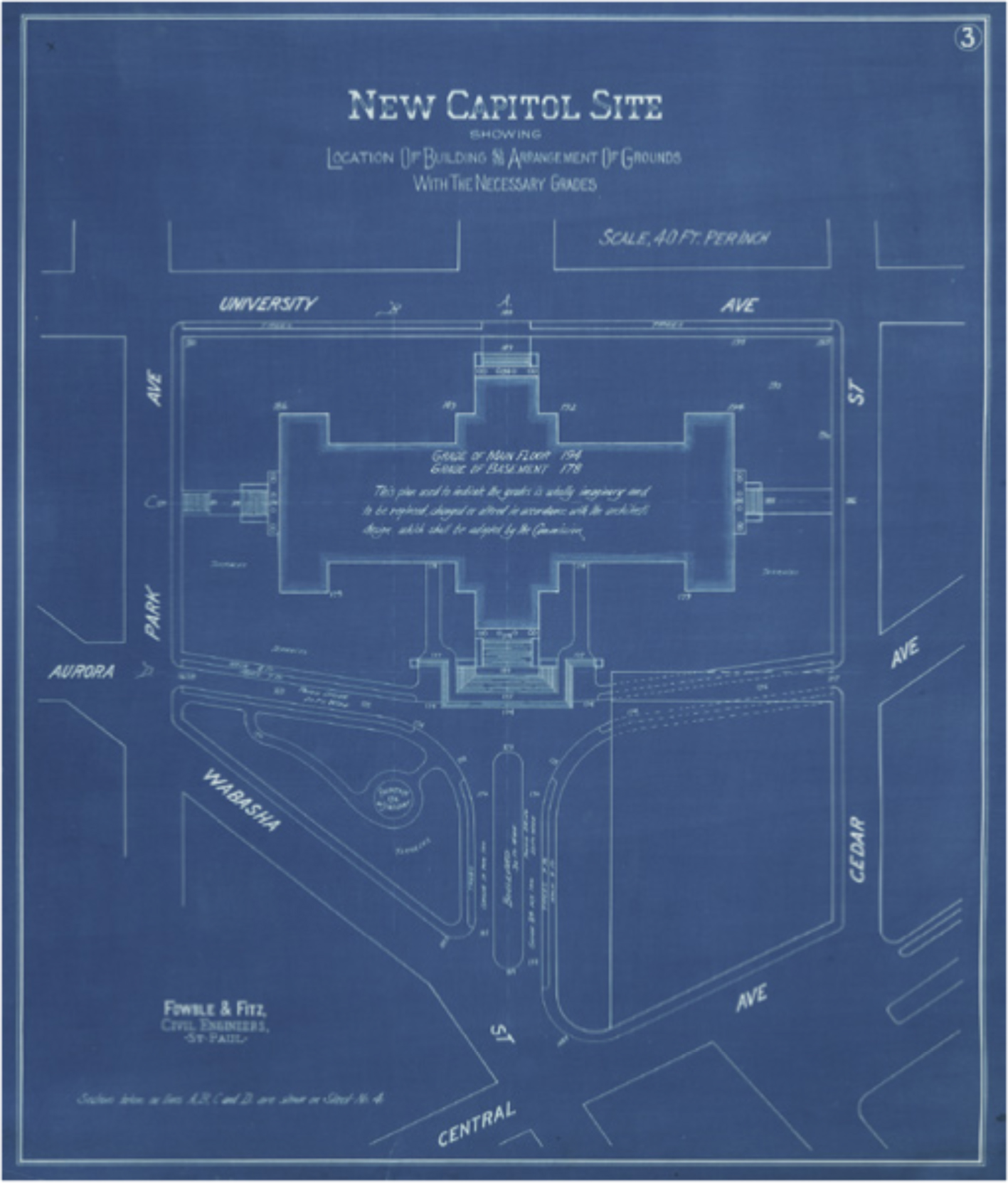
Fowble and Fitz plan for New Minnesota State Capitol Site, 1894

On March 15, 1894, the board engaged the St. Paul civil engineering and surveying firm of Fowble and Fitz to prepare a report with diagrams of the site of the third Minnesota State Capitol. The site was bounded by University Avenue on the north, Park to Wabasha Street to Central Avenue on the west and southwest, Central Avenue to Cedar Street on the southeast, and Cedar Street on the east to University Avenue.

In the beginning for the planning of the third State Capitol, a Capitol approach with surrounding grounds received little attention. The Board of State Capitol Commissioners, essentially prohibited development plans of the grounds in the 1895 architectural competition instructions.

When the Minnesota State Capitol opened in 1905, instead of the vast open green space of the State Capitol Mall, lined with state office buildings, it overlooked shaped small patch of green space and an asymmetric jumble of streets lined with commercial and residential structures built between the 1870s and early 1900s.

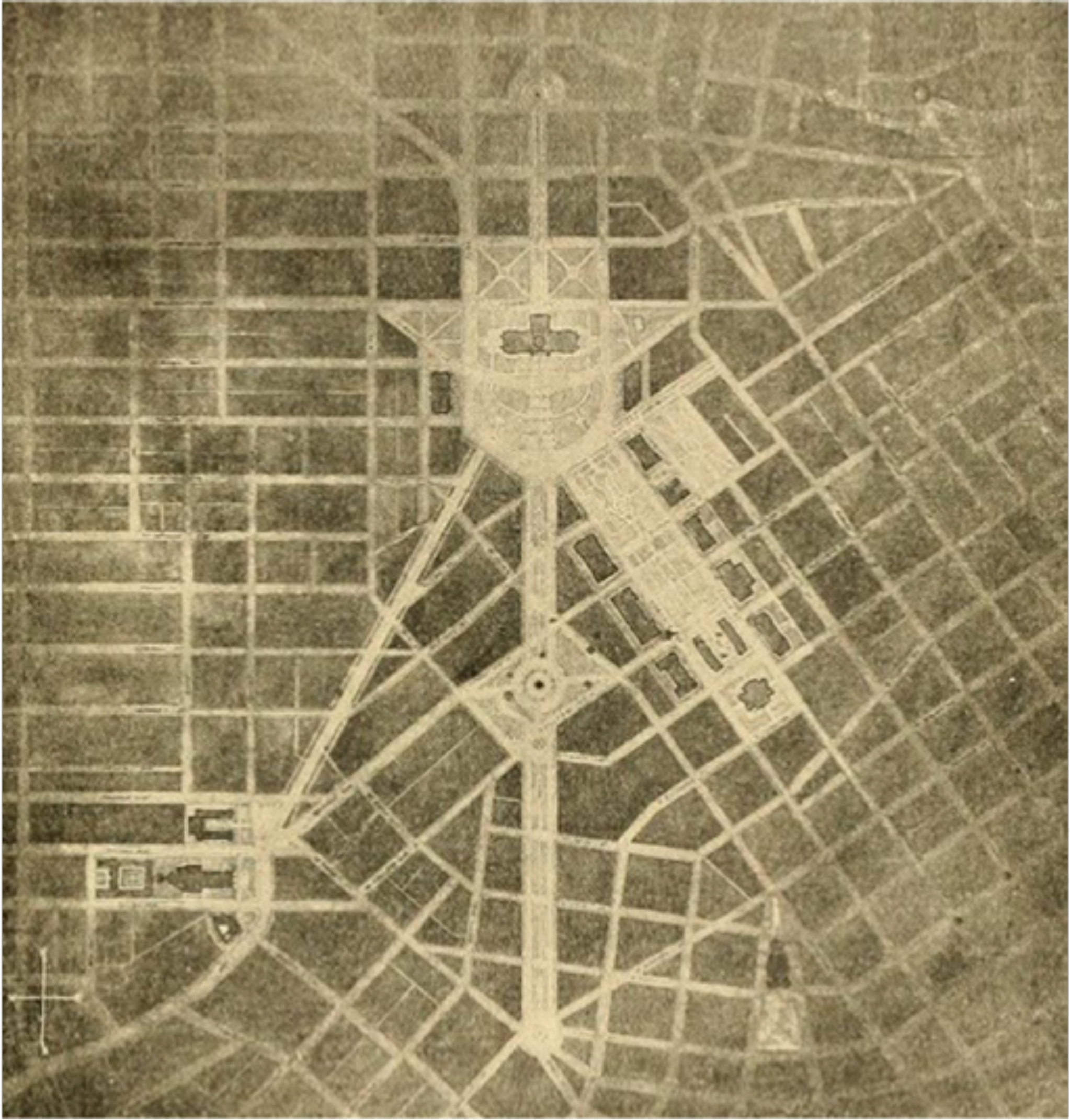
Cass Gilbert plan for Minnesota State Capitol approaches, 1903

The architect of the Minnesota State Capitol Cass Gilbert continued to advocate for a grand capitol approach that would do justice to his building's design until the end of his life, 30 years later.

Gilbert's capitol approach plan followed the Beaux-Arts precedents of the 1893 Chicago World's Columbian Exposition "White City" and the McMillan Plan for a park system in Washington, DC.

However, Minnesota legislators had little appetite in authorizing and appropriating the funds for the acquisition of nearby properties to implement Gilbert's grand vision.

Gilbert's ideas were incorporated into two larger city plans for St. Paul, proposed in 1911 and in 1922. Both were promoted in part by local business interests, but neither plan was formally adopted.

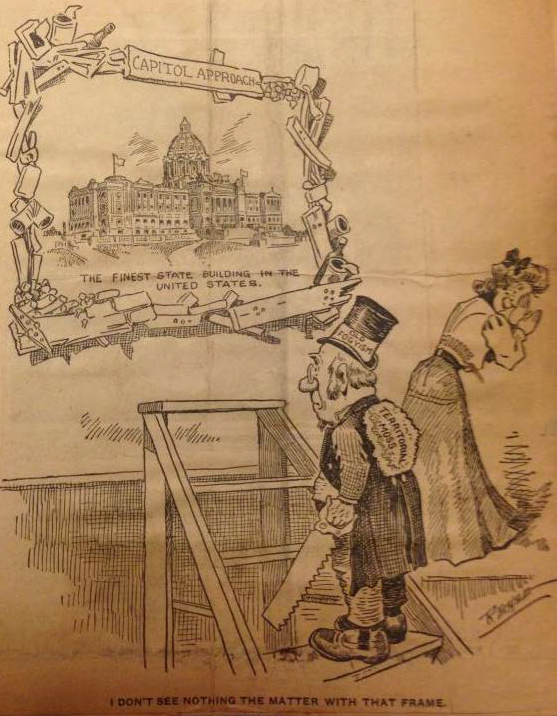
"I don't see anything the matter with that frame."

As time went on, the aging neighborhood surrounding the State Capitol, the blocks to the south, east, and west became increasingly deteriorated. In 1936 an article in Fortune magazine, accompanied by a watercolor illustration that depicted the capitol rising above the local slums, called "among the worst in the land".

A variety of grand proposals for more suitable frontage for the State Capitol were presented throughout the years but it wasn't until the end of World War II that city and state interests would finally align and a plan would take shape for the State Capitol Mall.

Designed by the landscape architecture firm of Morell and Nichols, the plan partially realized Gilbert's vision of landscaped grand boulevards providing key approaches to the capitol but removed Gilbert's Capitol south approach from Seven Corners. Not having it in the plan would be easier for the legislature to approve because it required less property acquisition. Instead the plan included an axial pedestrian mall leading from the capitol steps and terminating at a "court of honor", north of the Veterans Service Building site.

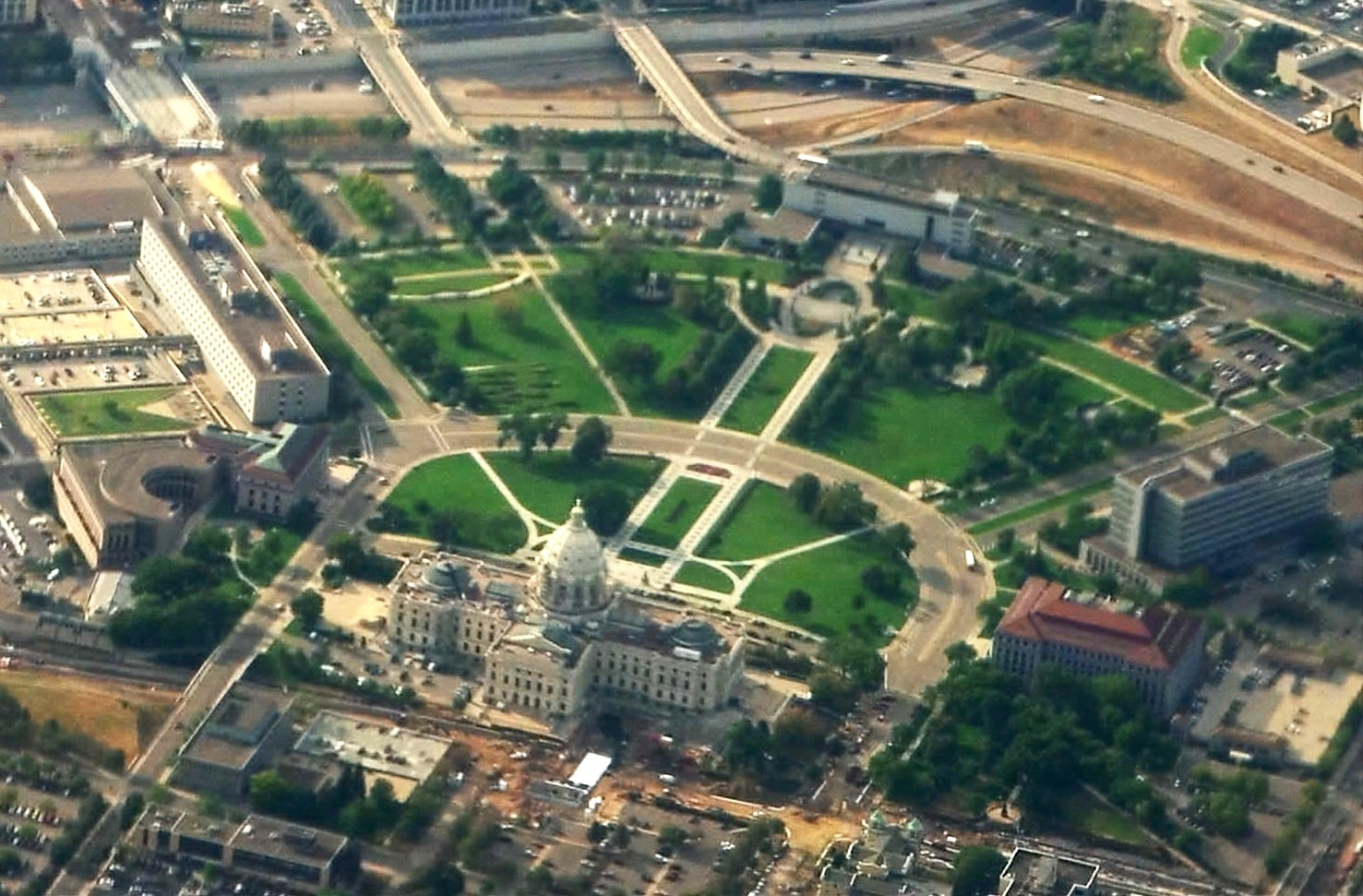
Birds eye view of Minnesota State Capitol mall in 2012

Funded by a $2 million state appropriation, the mall was planned to provide a grand setting for the State Capitol and for several new state buildings to be constructed in the future. The plan also anticipated a new "national defense" highway (today's Interstate 94), then in the planning stages, extending through downtown St. Paul requiring the destruction of numerous structures for its right of way.

Following approval of the plan, both the state commission and the City of St. Paul began to acquire property. More than 100 homes and buildings, including two churches, several apartment buildings, and "many sub-standard private homes" were condemned and then demolished to make room for the Capitol Mall and land for state buildings. Within five years, the neighborhood south of the Capitol was completely gone.

The erection of the Veterans Service Building, planned as a "living tribute", at the end of the mall facing the Capitol after World War II began another round of memorials.

The work was largely complete by 1955, leaving the State Capitol Mall with the overall form that still provides the setting for the Minnesota State Capitol.

In 1986 David Mayernik and Thomas N. Rajkovich entered an international competition to design the Capitol Grounds. They were only three years out of architecture school, but it was an open call, meaning no license was required. Theirs was one of five entries selected to go on to the second phase, for which they needed a license, so they associated with HGA of Minneapolis. They won the final phase that summer from a jury that included architects Demetri Porphyrios and Léon Krier, under governor Rudy Perpich. They were subsequently engaged by MnDoT to redesign the bridges over I94 that connected the capitol with downtown. The Capitol Grounds project was not realized.

On September 9, 2026, the Minnesota State EMS Line of Duty Death Memorial was approved to be built on the capitol mall. The site chosen for it is near the firefighter's memorial. Fundraising will begin in 2027.

== Monuments ==
A list of monuments and memorials on and around the State Capitol Mall.

=== Leif Erikson ===
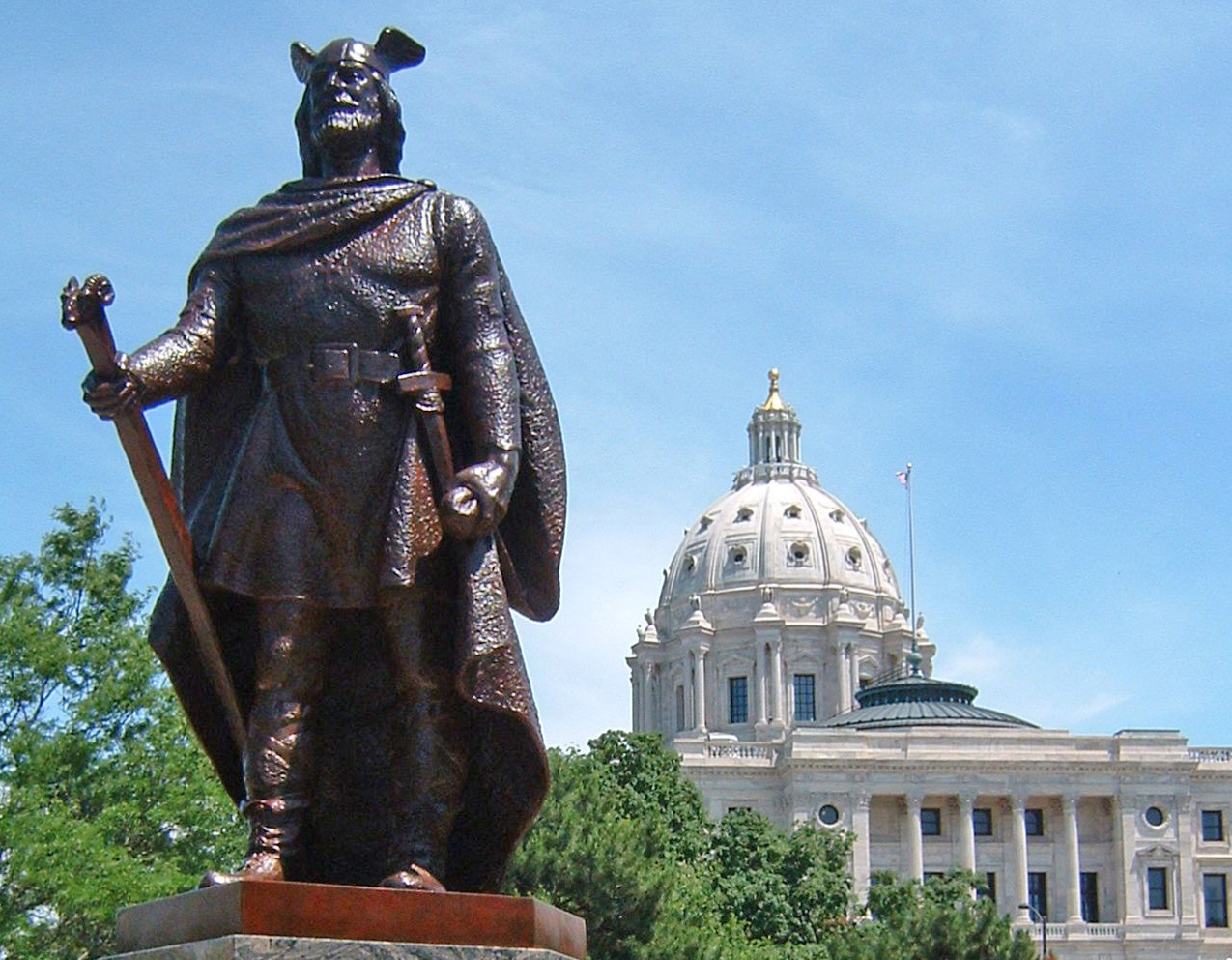
Leif Erikson

Leif Erikson is thought to have been the first known European to have set foot on continental North America (not including Greenland) in 1000 A.D. The Leif Erikson Monument Association formed with the purpose of erecting a memorial to Leif Erikson on a nearby site and was organized partially in response to the Mall's Columbus memorial which was dedicated in 1931. Norwegian American sculptor John Karl Daniels created a model of the statue in 1937. It wasn't until May 27, 1947 construction was started on the memorial site and the dedication occurred on October 9, 1949 part of a Leif Erikson Day celebration during the Minnesota Territorial Centennial of 1949. The dedication of the thirteen foot bronze figure was attended by 3,000 - 5,000 people. The memorial bears the title "Discoverer of America" on its pedestal. In 2015, legislation was introduced in the Minnesota House of Representatives to change the engraving to read "Leif Erikson Landed in America, 1000 A.D.." The bill did not pass.

- Sculptor: John Karl Daniels
- Dedicated: October 9, 1949.

=== Quadriga "Progress of the State" ===
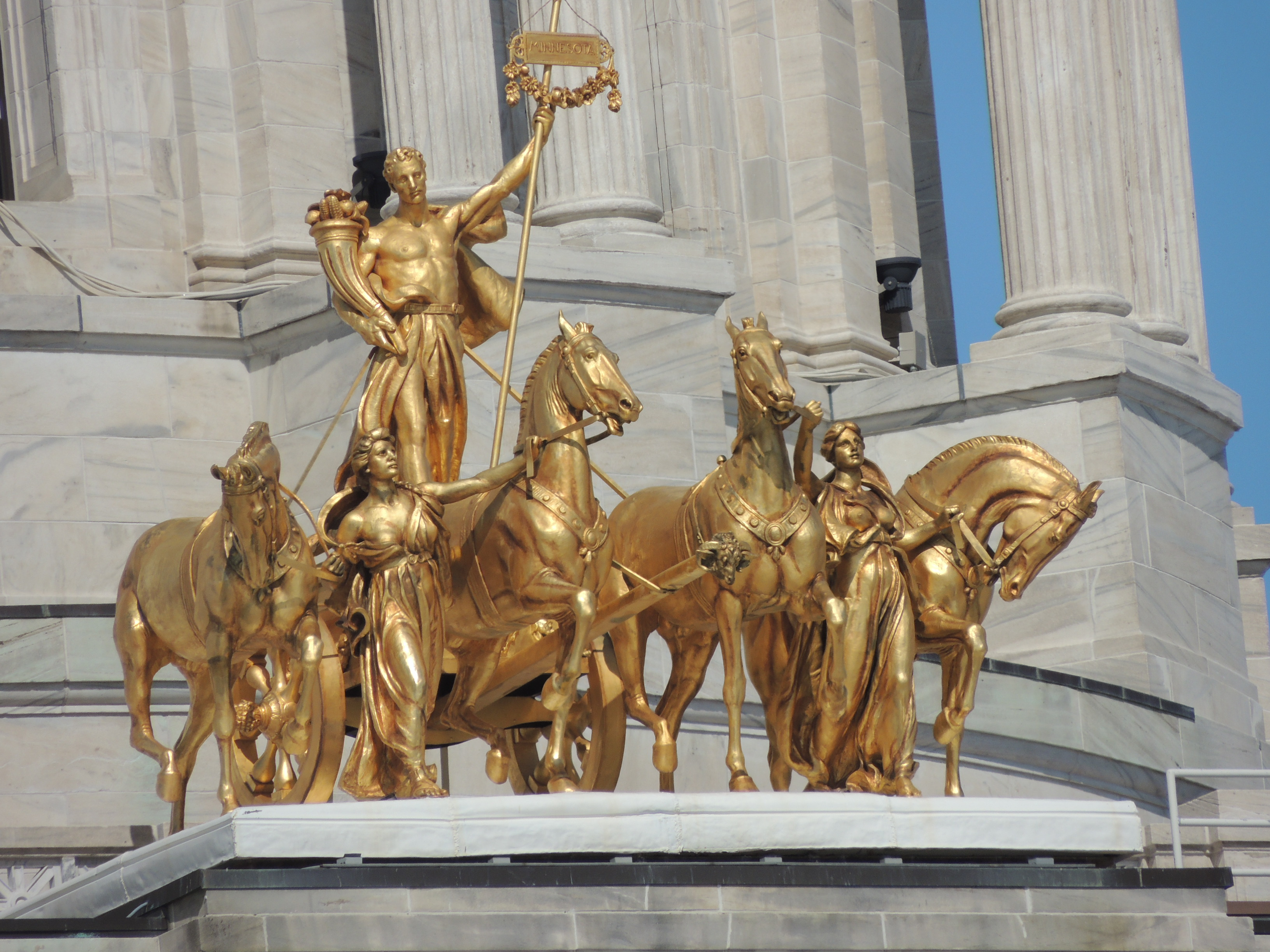
The Progress of the State

The Quadriga is an allegorical sculpture, created in 1906 by Daniel Chester French along with Edward Potter, a noted sculptor of animals, and is at the base of the Minnesota State Capitol's dome. Both artists had collaborated on the Columbus Quadriga, at the 1893 World's Columbian Exposition in Chicago on which the Minnesota quadriga is based. The charioteer represents the state's drive for progress and prosperity. The four horses represent the classical elements of earth, air, fire, and water and the two women, representing industry and agriculture hold their reins symbolizing control the forces of nature. The pineapples emerging from the hub of the chariot wheels are a symbol of hospitality. Collectively, they represent civilization suggesting the future progress of the state of Minnesota.

- Sculptors:Daniel Chester French and Edward Potter
- Created: 1906

=== Judicial Center Plaza ===
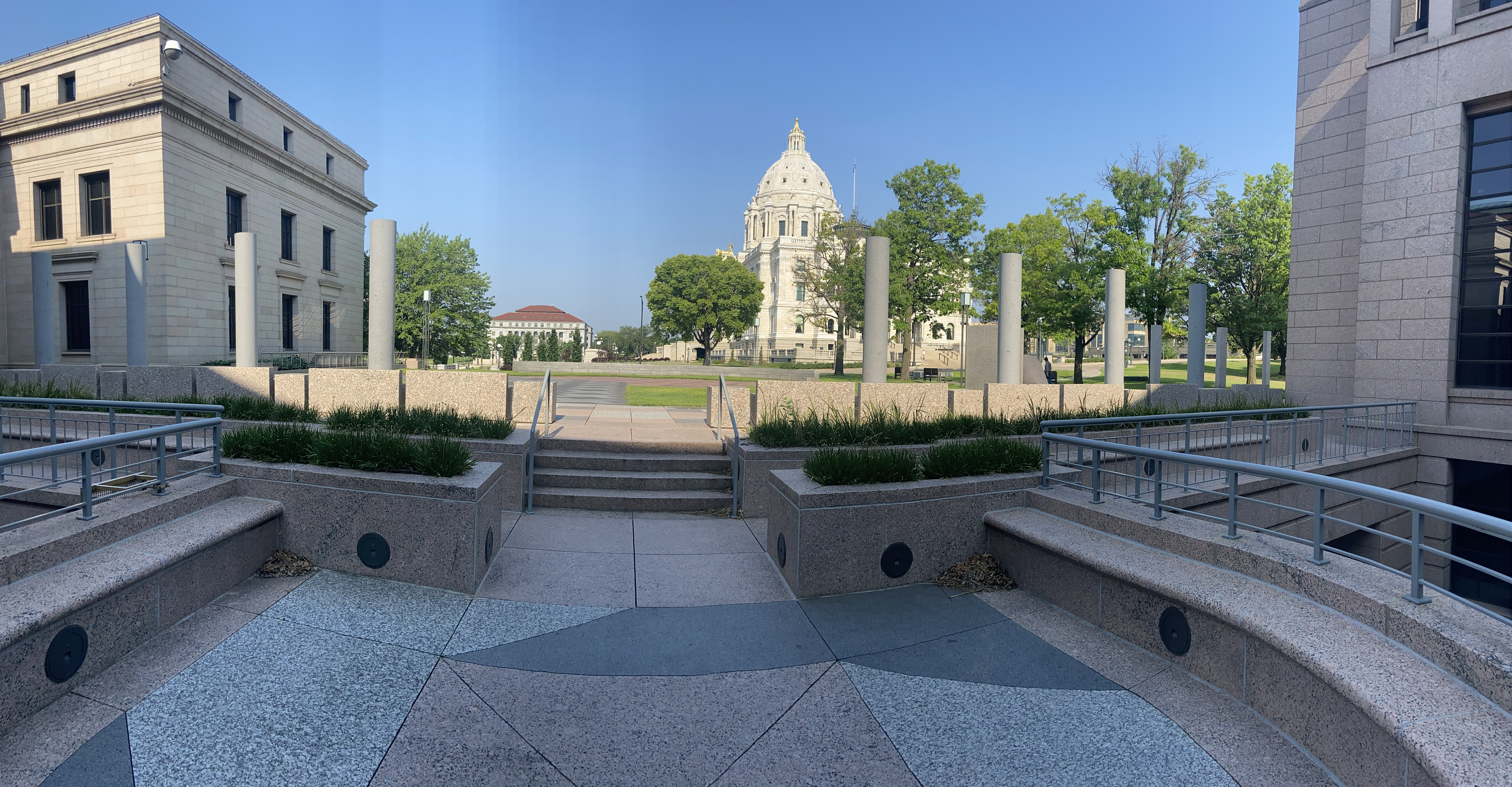
Judicial Plaza, looking towards the Minnesota State Capitol

Judicial Center Plaza is a public space with abstract pieces of granite scattered about the yard representing Greek ruins. The plaza consists of benches, columns, fixtures, a small amphitheater and a memorial wall.

- Sculptor: Richard Fleischner
- Title: Untitled
- Media: Granite, bronze and stone
- Created: 1990

=== Floyd B. Olson Memorial ===
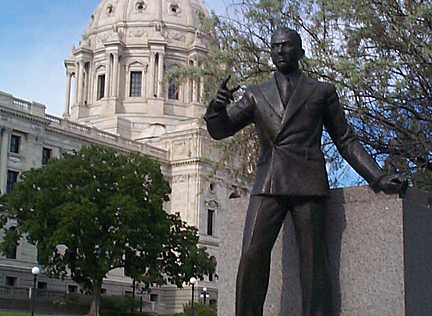
Floyd Olson Memorial

Floyd B. Olson was the Minnesota governor from 1931 to 1936. As a leader of the Farmer-Labor Party (later to merge with the Democratic Party and form the Minnesota Farmer-Labor Party) he was the first of its members to win the office of governor. As Minnesota's first Farmer-Labor Party governor, Olson pursued an activist agenda aimed at easing the impact of the Great Depression. Olson was elected to a 3rd term as governor in 1934. But his term was cut short when he of stomach cancer on August 22, 1936 at the age of 44.

- Sculptor: Carlo Brioschi and Amerigo Brioschi
- Dedicated: 1958 (during the Statehood Centennial)

=== John Johnson Memorial ===
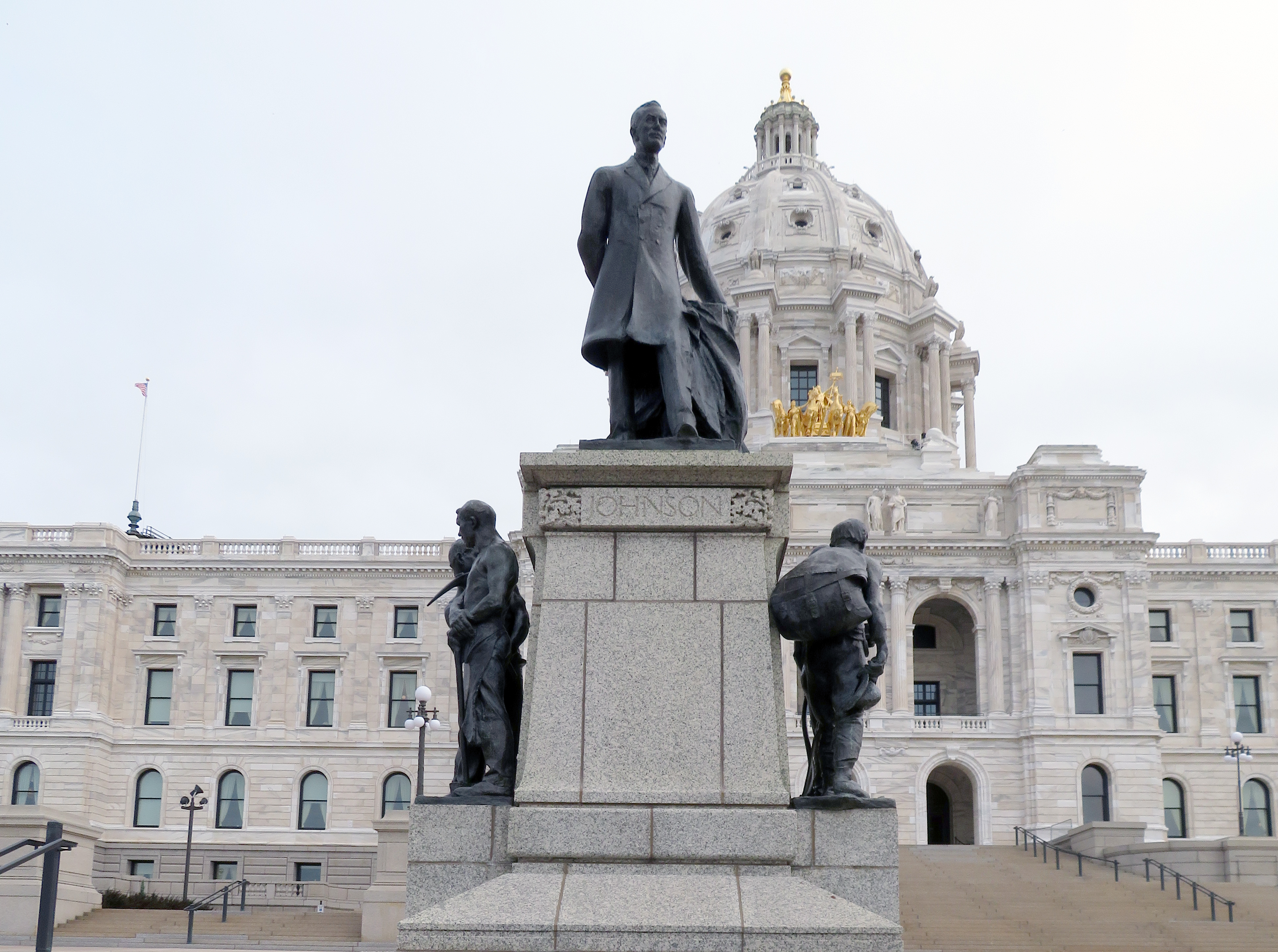
John Johnson Memorial

This was the first monument on the mall. John Albert Johnson Was elected to serve as governor in 1905 and died while in office suddenly on September 21, 1909, at age 48 in Rochester, Minnesota following surgery. Johnson was the first Minnesota native-born governor. At the 1908 Democratic Convention Johnson also was the first Minnesota governor to seek the presidential nomination but lost to William Jennings Bryan. The bronzes on the pedestal reflect the first major industries in Minnesota: agriculture, iron mining, lumbering and manufacturing.

- Sculptor: Andrew O'Connor
- Dedicated: 1912

=== Knute Nelson Memorial ===
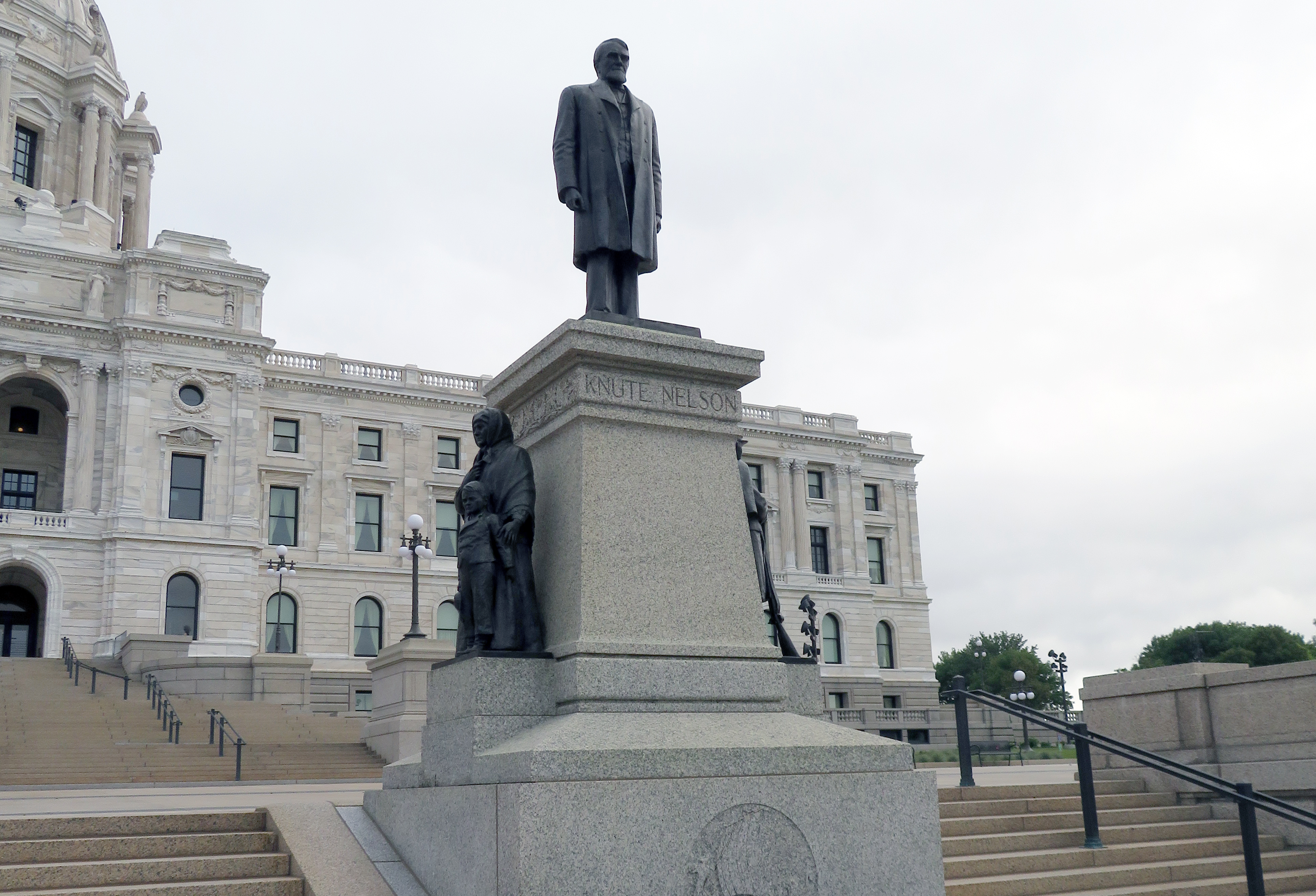
Knute Nelson Memorial

Knute Nelson was born in Evanger, Voss, Norway, on February 2, 1843. He is Minnesota's first foreign-born governor. During the American Civil War he served in the 4th Wisconsin Volunteer Infantry (1861–1864). Nelson was governor of Minnesota from January 4, 1893, to January 31, 1895. He resigned from the governorship in 1895 to successfully run for US Senate. He died in office, April 28, 1923, during his 5th senatorial term. The pedestal's bronze figures show him with his Norwegian mother as a child and as a soldier in the U.S. Civil War. This was the first of three sculptures on the mall done by artist John Karl Daniels.

- Sculptor: John Karl Daniels
- Dedicated: 1928

=== Hubert H. Humphrey Memorial ===
Hubert H. Humphrey was the Mayor of Minneapolis from 1945 to 1948, where he established the city's fair-employment commission and challenged the city's ingrained discrimination against Jews. In 1948 he is elected to the U.S. Senate serving three consecutive Senate terms. At the 1948 Democratic National Convention his address on civil rights won broad liberal acclaim and caused a walkout by Southern segregationist delegates. He was selected by President Lyndon Johnson as his running mate, and was elected vice-president in November 1964 and served from 1965 to 1969. In 1968 at Democratic National Convention Humphrey won his party's nomination for the Democratic candidate for President. In the general election, he lost narrowly to Richard Nixon. Humphrey is reelected to the Senate in 1971 and service until his death while in office in 1978. Near the end of his career, a poll of one thousand congressional staff named him the most effective U.S. senator of the previous fifty years.

- Sculptors: Jeff Koh Varilla and Anna Koh Varilla
- Site Design: Jeff Martin, DSU
- Dedicated: August 4, 2012

=== Minnesota Woman Suffrage Memorial ===
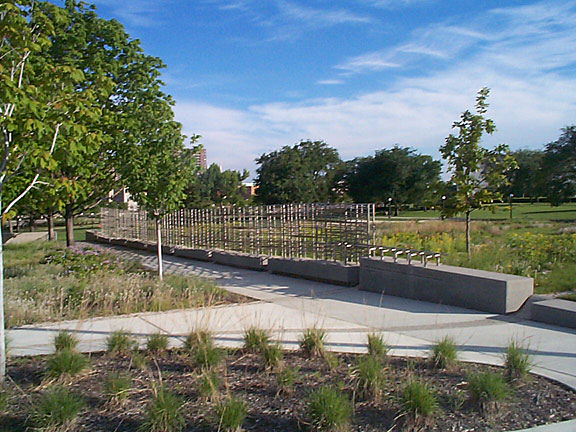
Minnesota Woman Suffrage Memorial

The Minnesota Woman Suffrage Memorial incorporates a trellis with the names of 25 women whose achievements were important in the national struggle to win the vote and quotes from suffrage leaders. The memorial consists of a garden entitled "Garden of Time: Landscape of Change" and features a timeline series of aluminum signs, each one of which describes an event in the United States women's suffrage campaign.

- Sculptor: Raveevarn Choksombatchai and Ralph Nelson
- Landscape Designer: Roger Grothe
- Dedicated: August 26, 2000

=== Charles Lindbergh Memorial "The Boy and the Man" ===
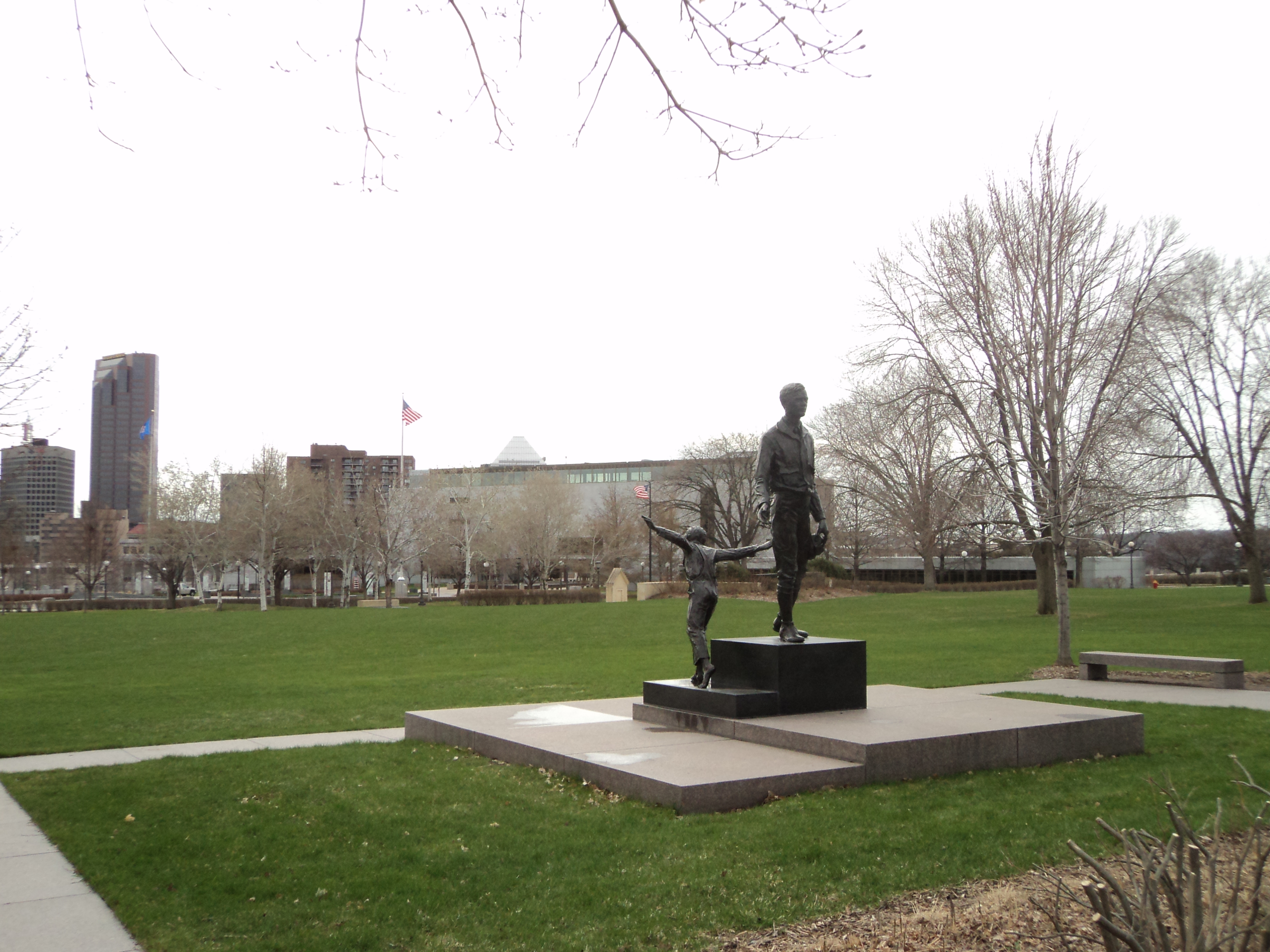
Charles Lindbergh Memorial

The bronze statue memorializes the Minnesota aviator Charles A. Lindbergh who completed the first solo, nonstop transatlantic flight, flying his plane, Spirit of St. Louis from Long Island, New York, to Paris, France. Bronze sculpture group depicts Charles Lindbergh, who grew up on a farm near Little Falls as a boy dreaming of flying and as a man with that dream having become a reality. While most reactions to the sculpture were positive, some were concerned with its place of honor in light of Lindbergh's antisemitic comments leading up to World War II.

- Sculptor: Paul T. Granlund
- Dedicated: 1985

=== Roy Wilkins Memorial "Spiral for Justice" ===
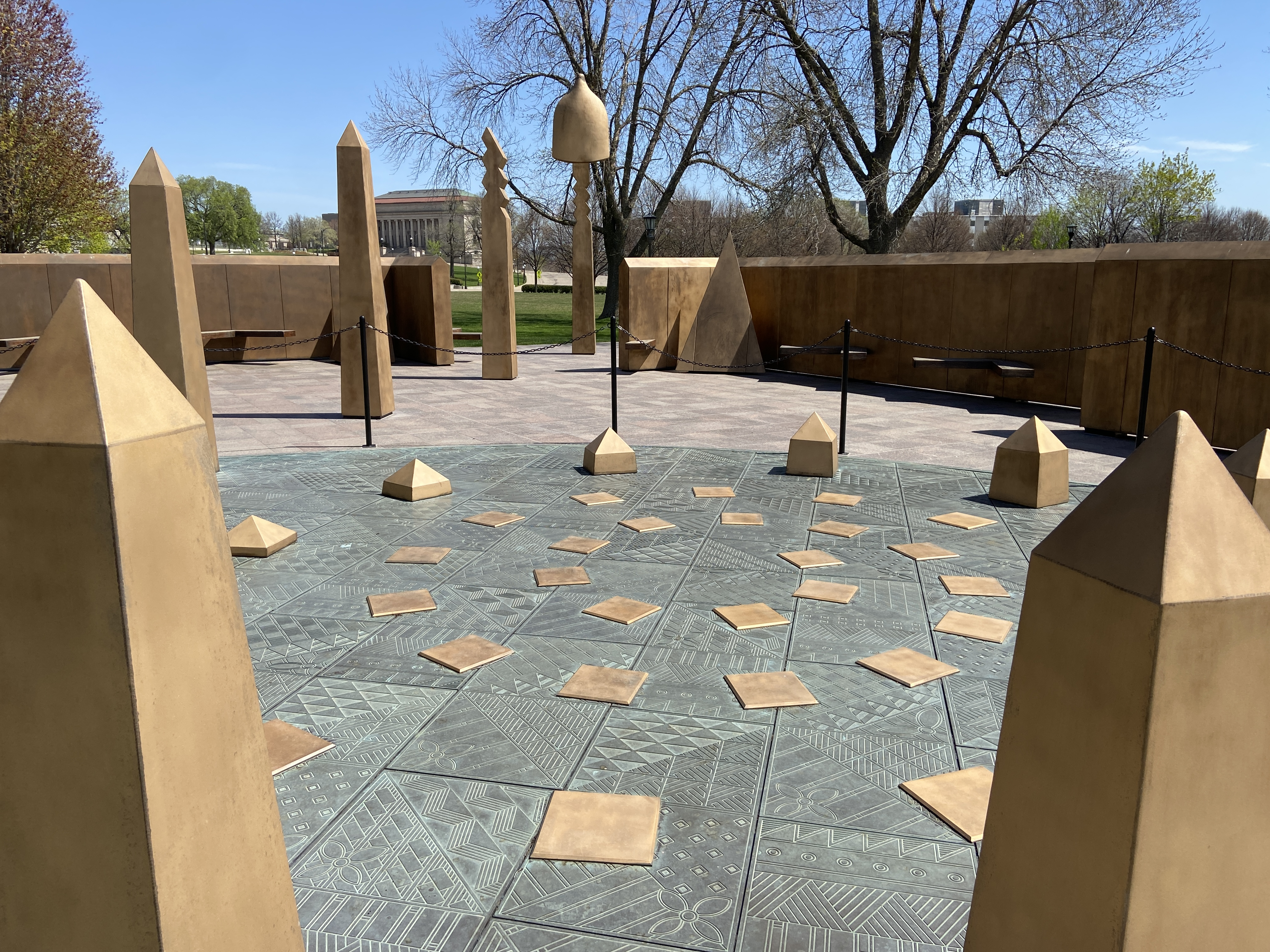
Roy Wilkins Memorial

The memorial includes 46 elements to represent the 46 years from 1949 to 1977 Roy Wilkins' directorship of the National Association for the Advancement of Colored People (NAACP) helped achieve the greatest civil rights advancements in U.S. history. The wall symbolizes barriers created by racial segregation and other impede the progress towards racial equality, the spiral ascends above and through those walls, along with a obelisk adorned with an African reliquary, a reference to Africans honoring their ancestors.

- Sculptor: Curtis Patterson
- Dedicated: November of 1995

=== Special Forces in Laos Memorial ===
The Memorial honors and recognizes the service and sacrifice Hmong and Lao veterans who served and fought for the U.S. in Southeast Asia during the Vietnam War.

- Sculptor: Marjorie Pitz
- Site Design: Kathryn Ryan and Greg Brown
- Dedicated: June 11, 2016

=== Minnesota Vietnam Veterans Memorial "Lakefront DMZ" ===
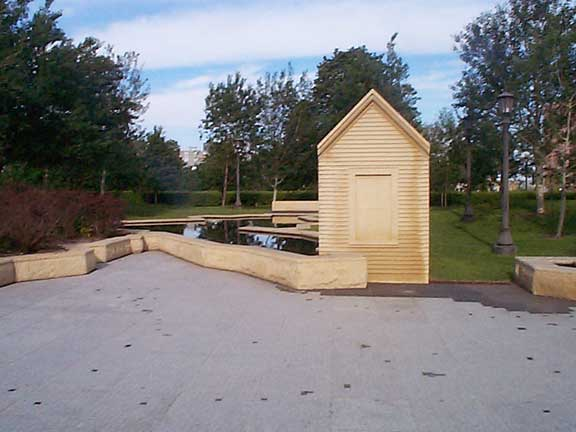
Minnesota Vietnam Veterans Memorial

A red granite map of Indochina forms the entrance to the memorial. A winding concrete pathway metaphorically brings you home from Southeast Asia. The granite wall is engraved with all 1,120 names of Minnesota's Vietnam War KIAs and MIAs. The main plaza is surfaced with 68,000 granite squares, each representing a Minnesotan who served. 1,120 of the squares are dark green and represent the hometowns of soldiers killed or missing. A limestone house facade introduces representation of theme of homecoming while pools, streams, and native Minnesota trees and shrubs further adds to that sense.

- Designers: Nina Ackerberg, Stanton Sears, Jake Castillo and Rich Laffin
- Dedicated: September 26, 1992

=== Court of Honor ===
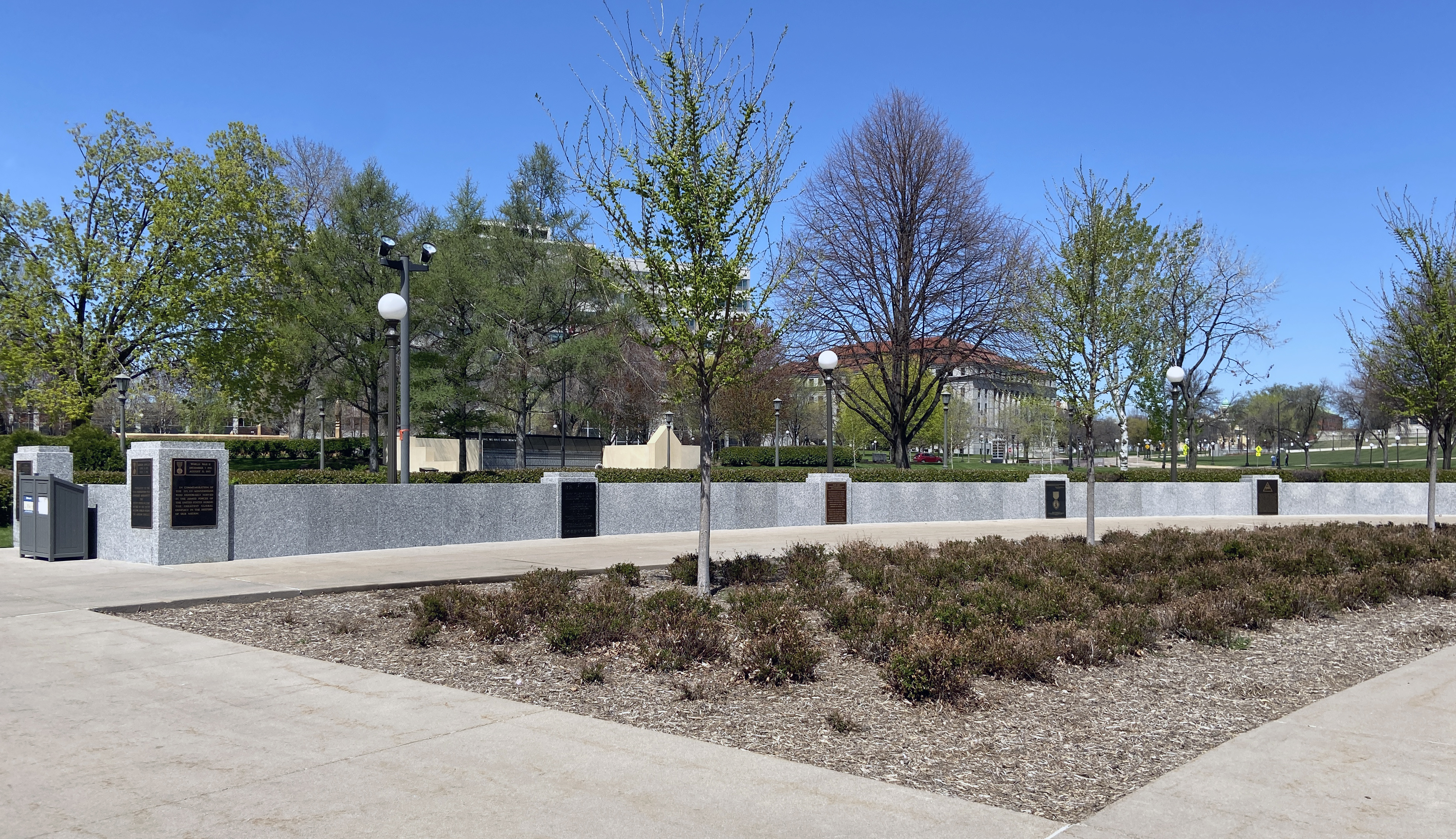
Court of Honor

Since WWII, the Court of Honor has been a tribute to veterans and forms a circular area on the mall north of the Veteran Services Building. The walls of the memorial are lined with bronze plaques honoring the soldiers who gave their lives in wars the U.S has fought in

=== Minnesota Korean War Veterans Memorial ===
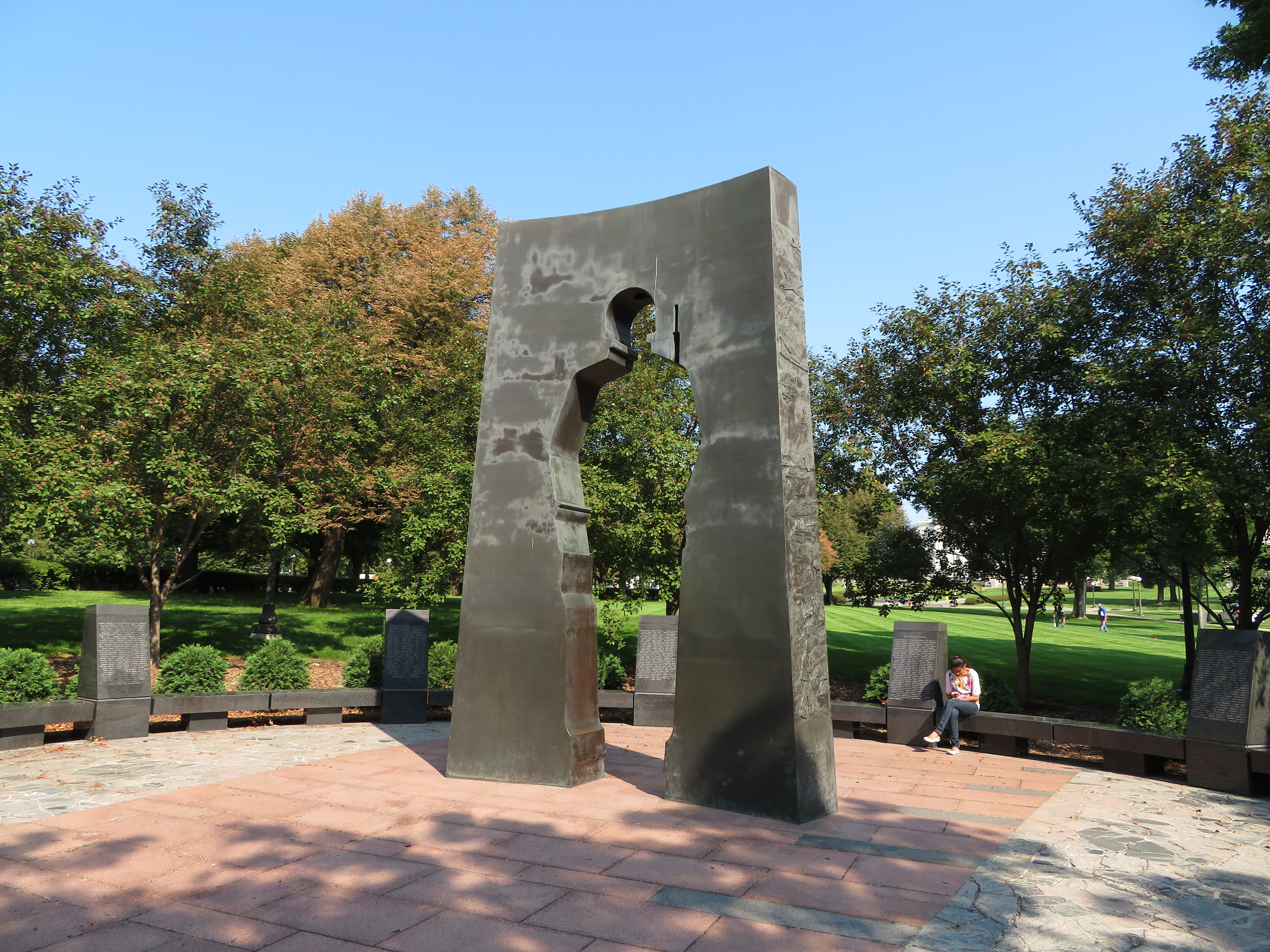
Korean War Veterans Memorial

A larger-than-life bronze figure represents a soldier searching for his lost unit and comrades. The granite silhouette of a soldier is intended to represent the missing in action from the Korean War. Columns on the site list the names of the 748 Minnesotan Korean War dead.

- Sculptor: Art Norby
- Landscape architects: Bob Kost and Dean Olson
- Dedicated: September 18, 1998

=== Minnesota Workers Memorial Garden ===
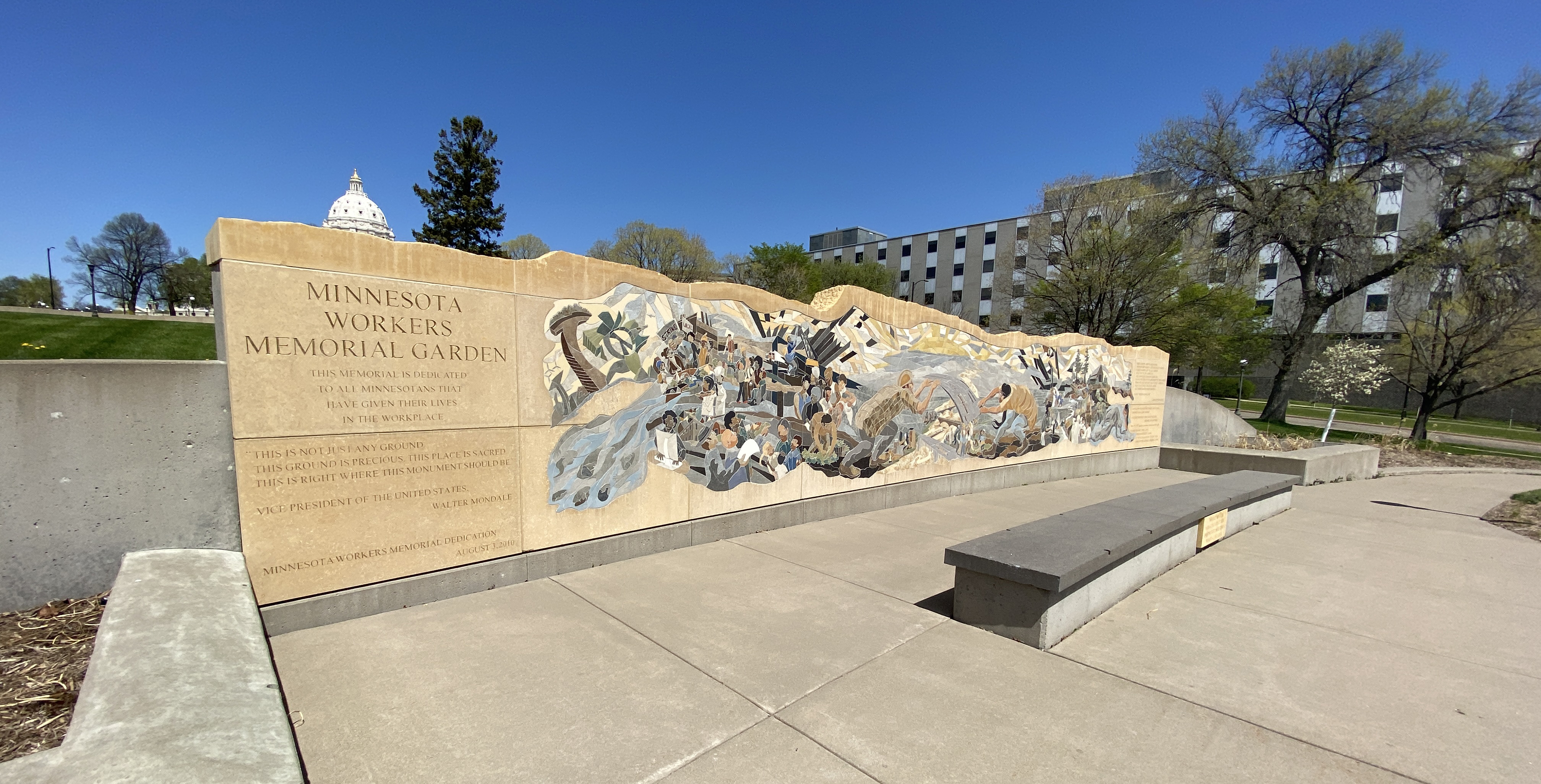
Minnesota Workers Memorial Garden

Inscribed on a limestone panel are the words "THIS MEMORIAL IS DEDICATED TO ALL MINNESOTANS THAT HAVE GIVEN THEIR LIVES IN THE WORKPLACE". The mural on the memorial depicts workers of all races and genders in many occupations. Minnesota's labor leaders gather at the memorial to observe Workers Memorial Day on April 28 and to honor workers who died that year in accidents while on the job or from injuries related to work.

- Mural Design: Craig David
- Sculptor: Mark Wickstrom
- Landscape Architects: Jean Garbarini and Jennifer Germain
- Dedicated: August 3, 2010
- Re-dedicated: 2016

=== Military Family Tribute ===
==== Gold Star Table ====
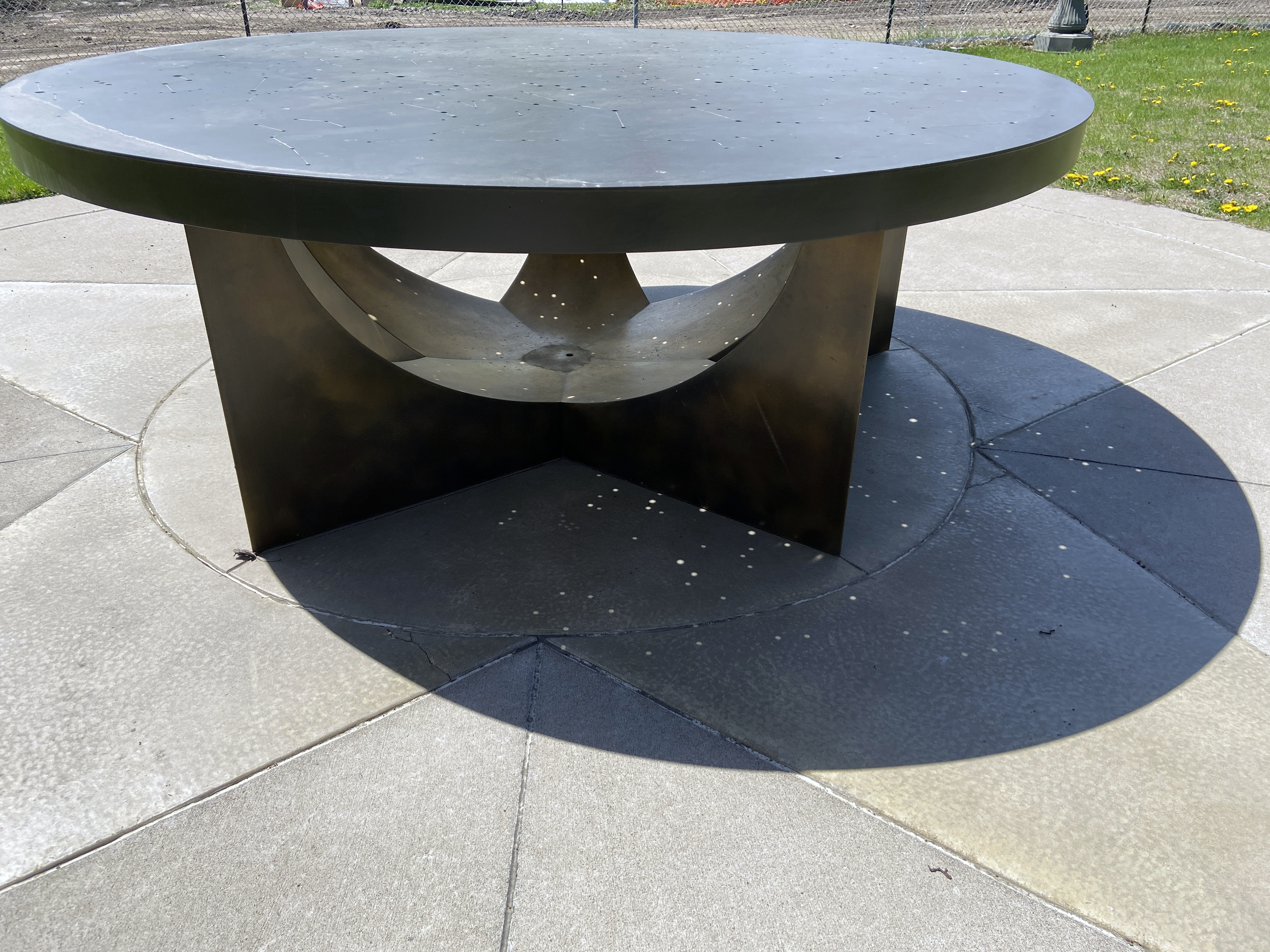
Gold Star Table

The tables five legs lead to five points of a gold star, signifying the Gold Star, which since 1917 it is a symbol used to recognize the loss of a loved one in military service. The table top features a polished surface and light shines though holes to form the Northern hemisphere constellations. Polaris-the North Star, is highlighted as a persistent navigational guide to home and also refers to Minnesota's state motto: "L'toile du Nord", (Star of the North). The Minnesota Military Family Tribute honors the Minnesota family members of a fallen service member who died while serving. The Gold Star Table recognizes the ultimate sacrifice by Gold Star Families.

- Designer: Theodore Lee
- Fabricator: MG McGrath
- Dedicated: June 13, 2015

==== Story Stones ====
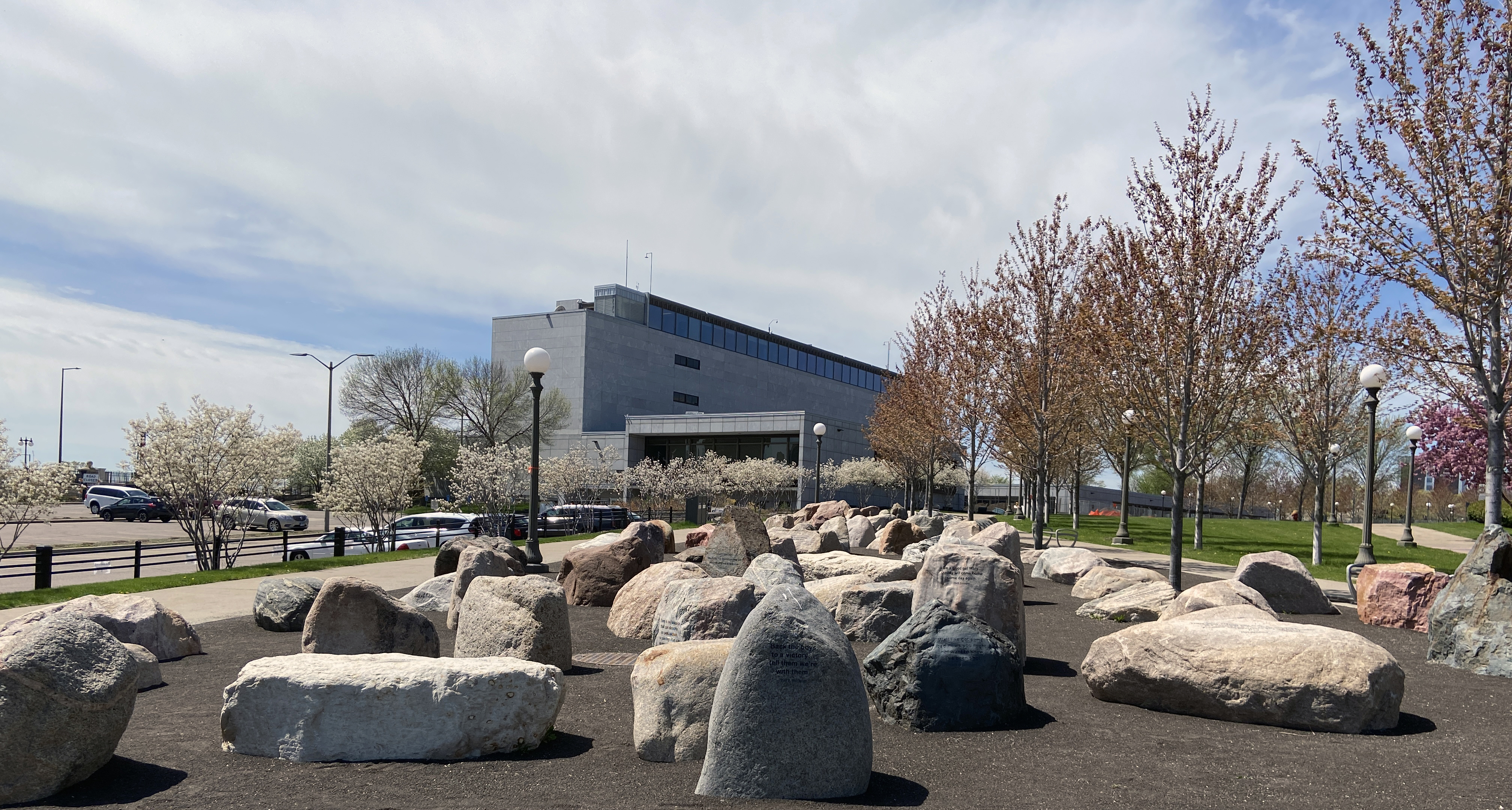
Story Stones

The 87 stones in the memorial represent each of the Minnesota's 87 counties. Etched onto these stones are excerpts from letters sent between soldiers and their loved ones at home and the identify the county of the sender and recipient. Story Stones represents connections between soldiers deployed for active military duty and their loved ones at home through the correspondence of letters from the American Civil War to the present sent between them. Example: "Be a good girl Mary" "Daddy will come home some day again." -1945 Stearns (county)

- Designer: Theodore Lee
- Dedicated: June 13, 2015

=== Minnesota World War II Veterans Memorial ===
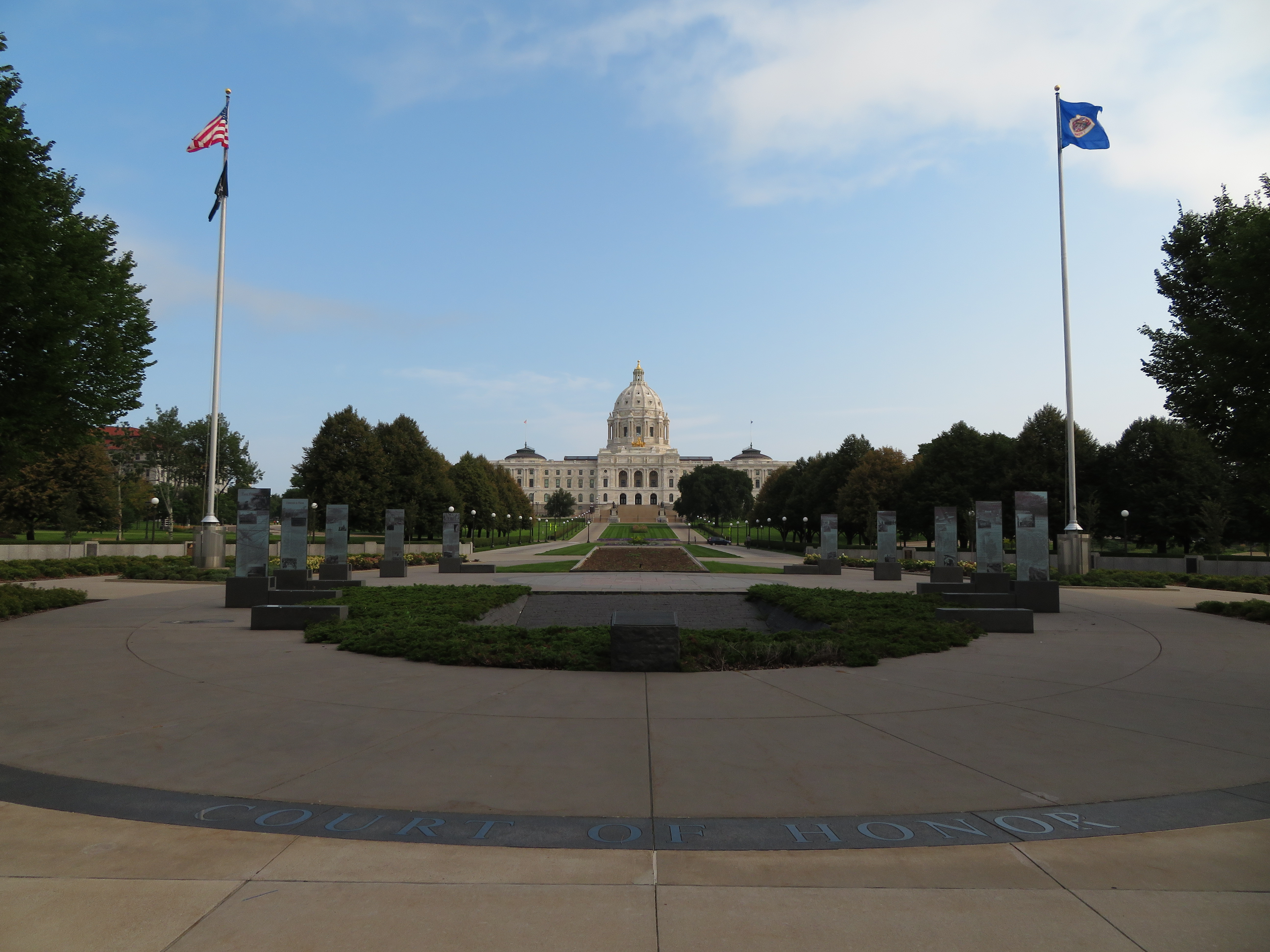
Minnesota World War II Veterans Memorial

The memorial features ten glass panels etched with text and scenes from World War II, within a plaza area at the foot of a mall leading to the front entrance to the Capitol. The glass panels are three feet wide, eight feet tall, and mounted on Minnesota granite.

- Designers: Ben Sporer, Todd Hallunes, Andrea Myklebust and Stanton Sears; Landscape Architect: * Bryan D. Carlson
- Dedicated: June of 2007

=== Minnesota Fallen Firefighters Memorial ===
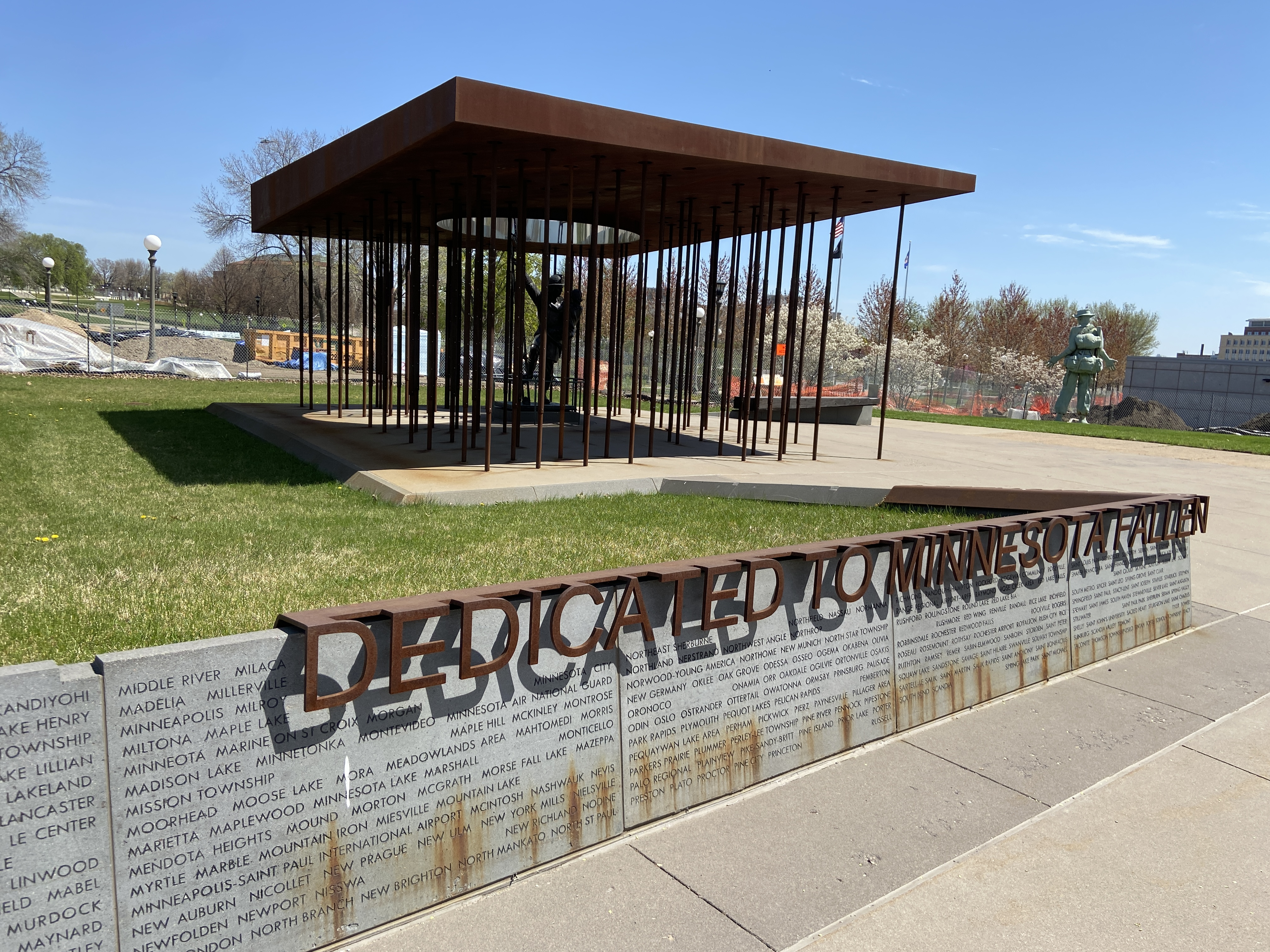
Minnesota Fallen Firefighters Memorial

The statue was originally at the Minneapolis-Saint Paul International Airport but was later moved to the Minnesota State Capitol mall. A granite wall greets visitors to the memorial lists the names of the 791 Minnesota fire departments. Columns list with names of the 217 Minnesota firefighters who were fatalities in the line-of-duty since 1881. The rusting/weathering steel of the columns are meant to symbolize the oxidation of fire.

- Sculptor: Douglas O. Freeman
- Architect: Leo A Daly
- Engineer: Westwood Professional Services
- Dedicated: September 30, 2012

=== Monument to the Living ===
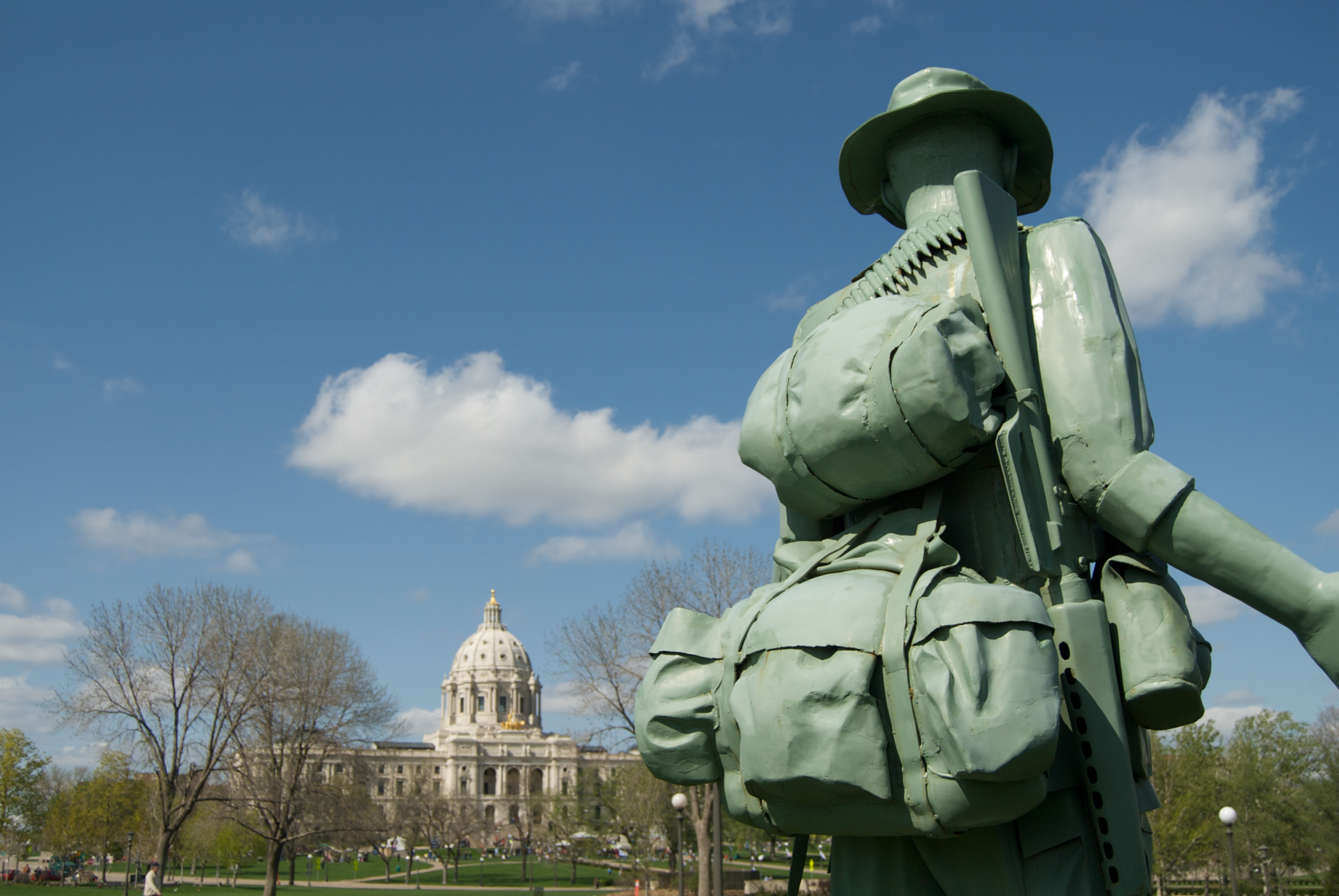
Monument to the Living

Dedicated ten years before the Vietnam memorial is the monument, entitled "Monument to the Living" and created by a Vietnam veteran out of 1,500 hammered pieces of steel, and funded mostly by VFW chapters. The nearly 12 foot tall figure of welded steel portrays a 19 year-old soldier in combat gear, asking the question "Why do you forget us?".

- Sculptor: Rodger M. Brodin
- Dedicated: May 22, 1982

=== Medal of Honor Memorial ===
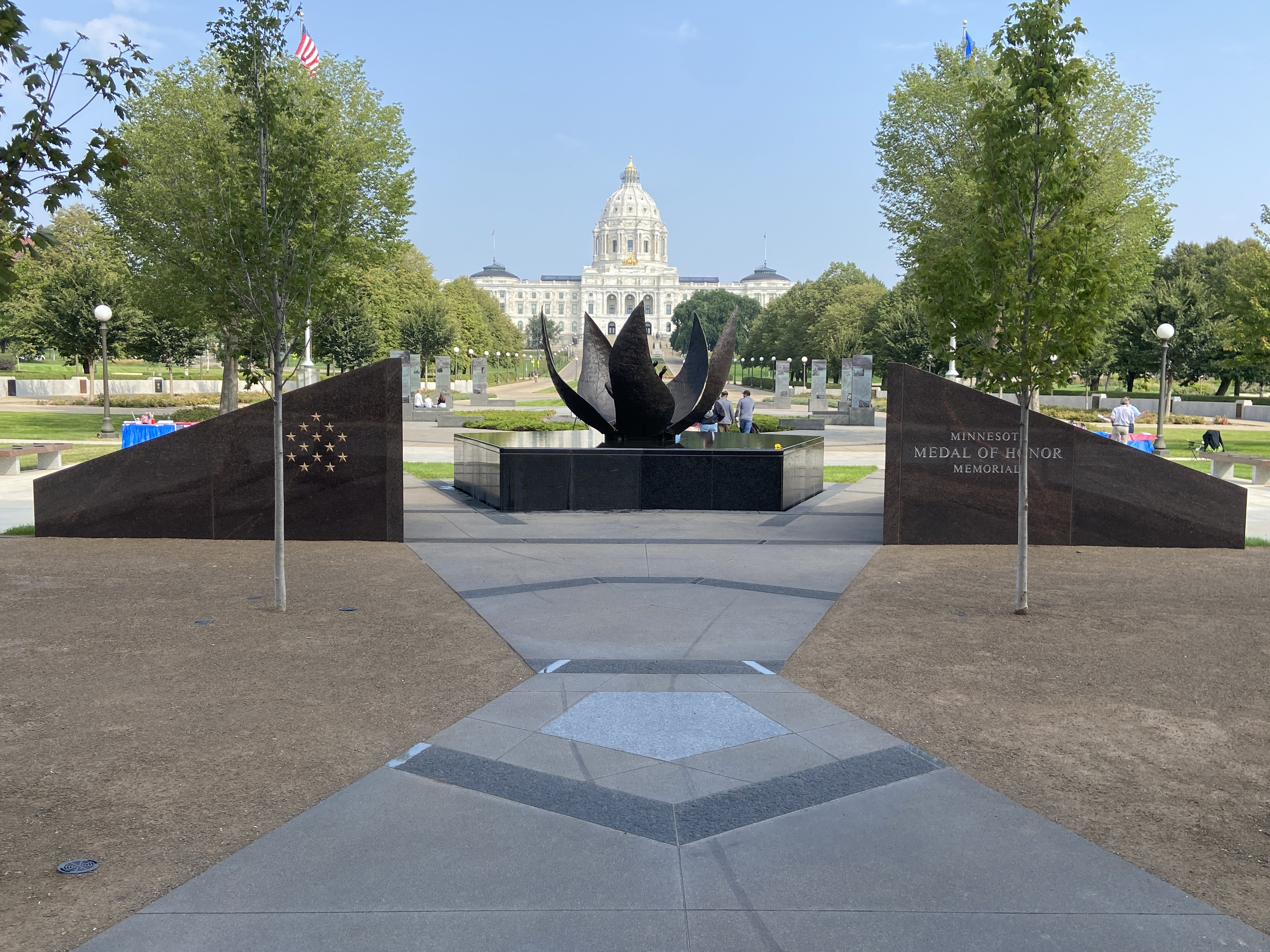
Medal of Honor Memorial

The Minnesota Medal of Honor Memorial, unveiled on September 22, 2022, is dedicated to Minnesota's Medal of Honor recipients. Situated at the main entrance of the Capitol Mall, it connects with other veterans' memorials and tributes while offering views of the Capitol building. Its design creates a connection to the adjacent World War II Memorial and the Court of Honor. The memorial incorporates the "Promise of Youth" sculpture that previously occupied the space.

- Dedicated: September 22, 2022
- Designer: HGA
- Sculptor: Alonzo Hauser
- Dedicated (Promise of Youth): 1958

=== U.S.S. Ward Gun ===
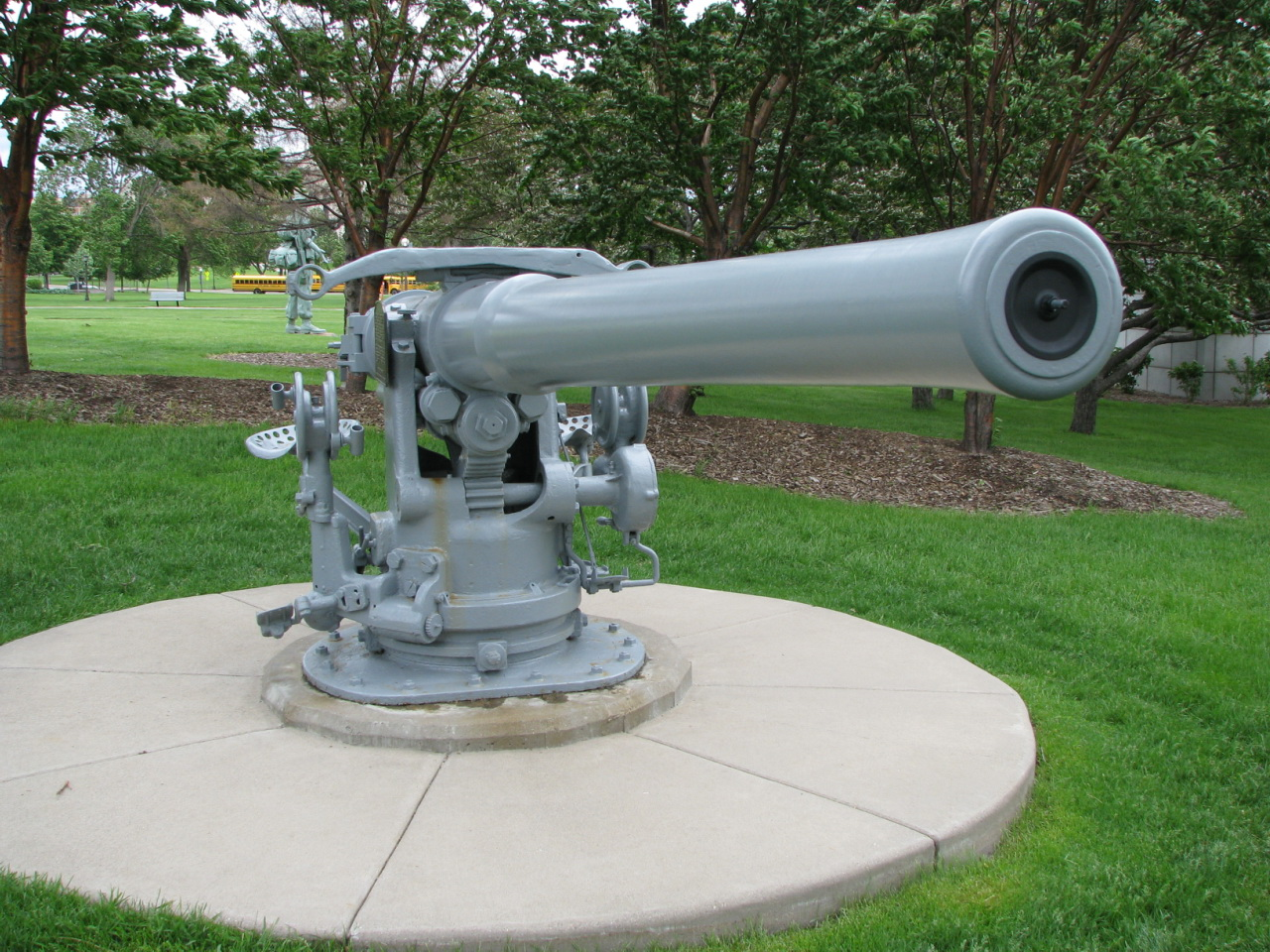
U.S.S. Ward Gun

Operated by a Minnesota Naval Reservists crew, the destroyer U.S.S. Ward earned an historic chapter in military history when on December 7, 1941, it caused the first American-caused casualties in the defense of the US in the Second World War, sinking an enemy Japanese Ko-hyoteki-class, two-man midget submarine off Pearl Harbor, Hawaii. The gun was gifted to the state by the U.S. Navy during Statehood Week, May 10, 1958, the centennial year of Minnesota's Statehood.

- Acquired from: U.S.S. Ward Gunship
- Dedicated: May 10, 1958

=== Peace Officers Memorial ===
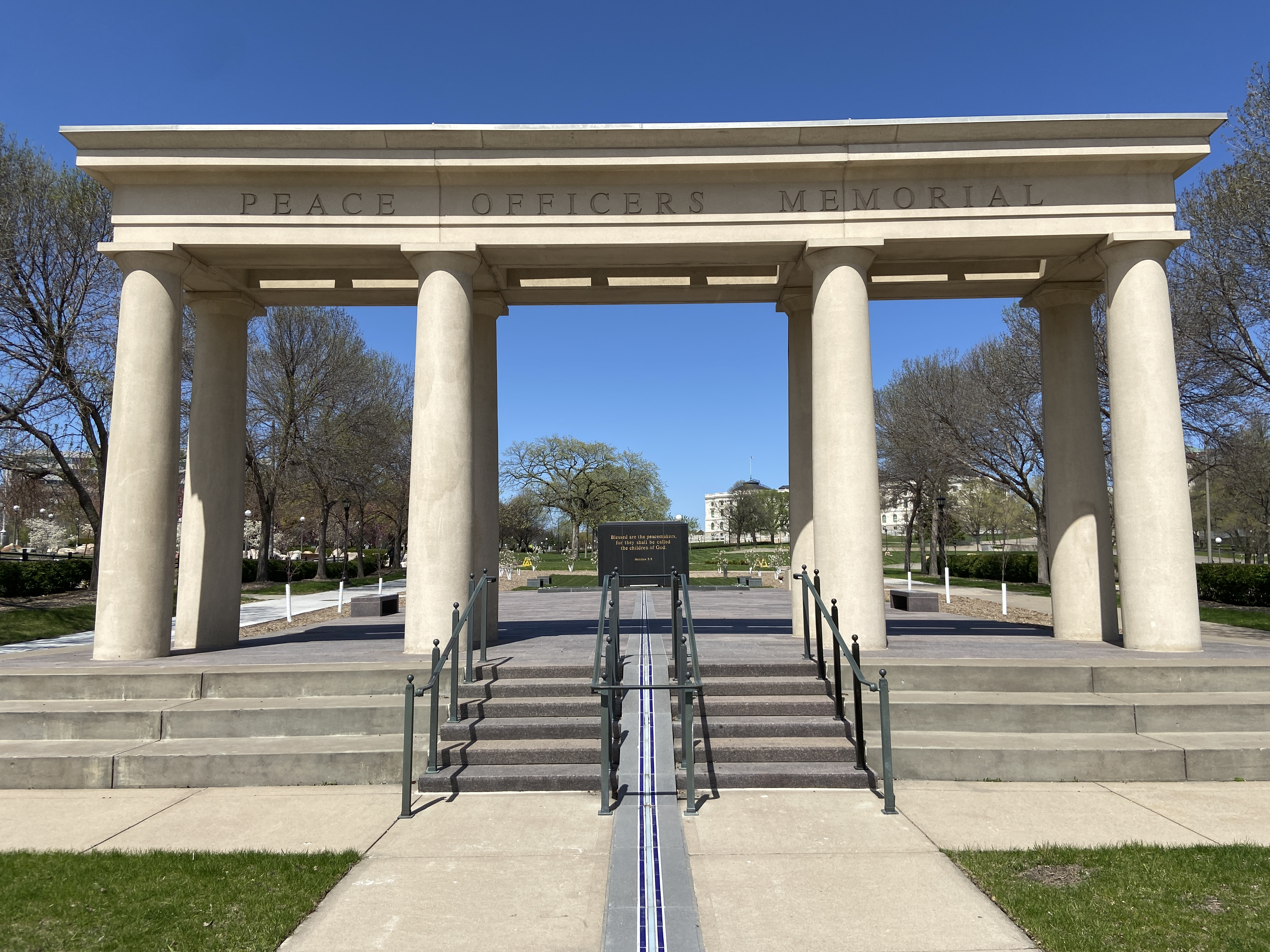
Peace Officers Memorial

The Peace Officers Memorial honors the Minnesota officers who have lost their lives in the line of duty.The inside on quote on the granite marker reads, "Blessed are the peacemakers for they shall be called the children of God. Matthew 5:9".

- Designers: Fred Richter and Mark Wentzell
- Dedicated: June 1995

=== Earthbound Monument ===
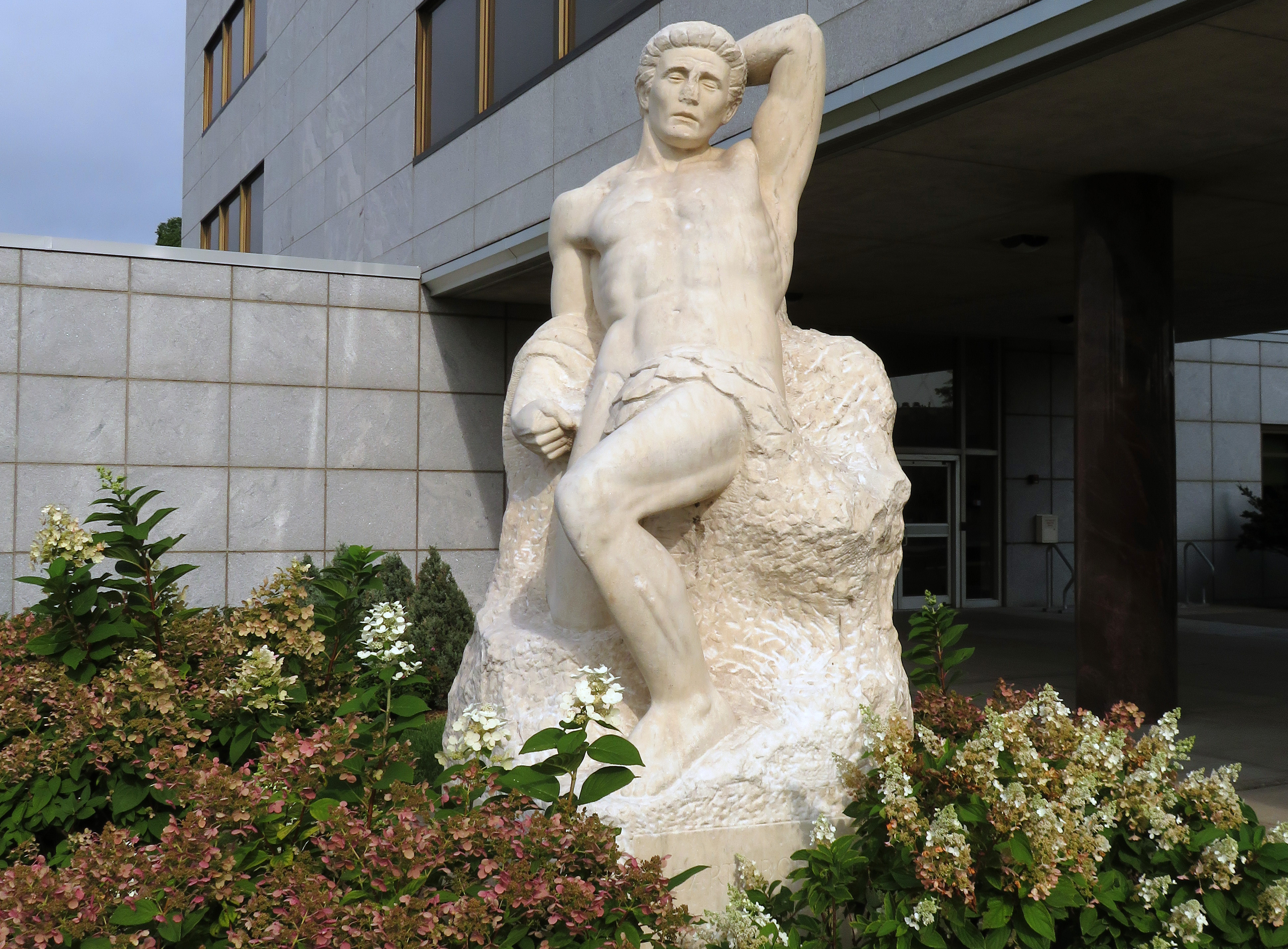
Earthbound Monument

"Earthbound, Made Captive, Yet Deserving Freedom More". - John Milton, English poet (engraved on the statue's base). This marble sculpture is of a man bound by stone and memorializes those veterans who served in war. It was carved in a shed on the Capitol grounds from a block of Vermont marble from July 1954 until June 1956. According to the artist, the statue symbolizes "mankind's everlasting struggle for freedom."

- Sculptor: John Karl Daniels
- Dedicated: 1956.

=== Liberty Bell ===
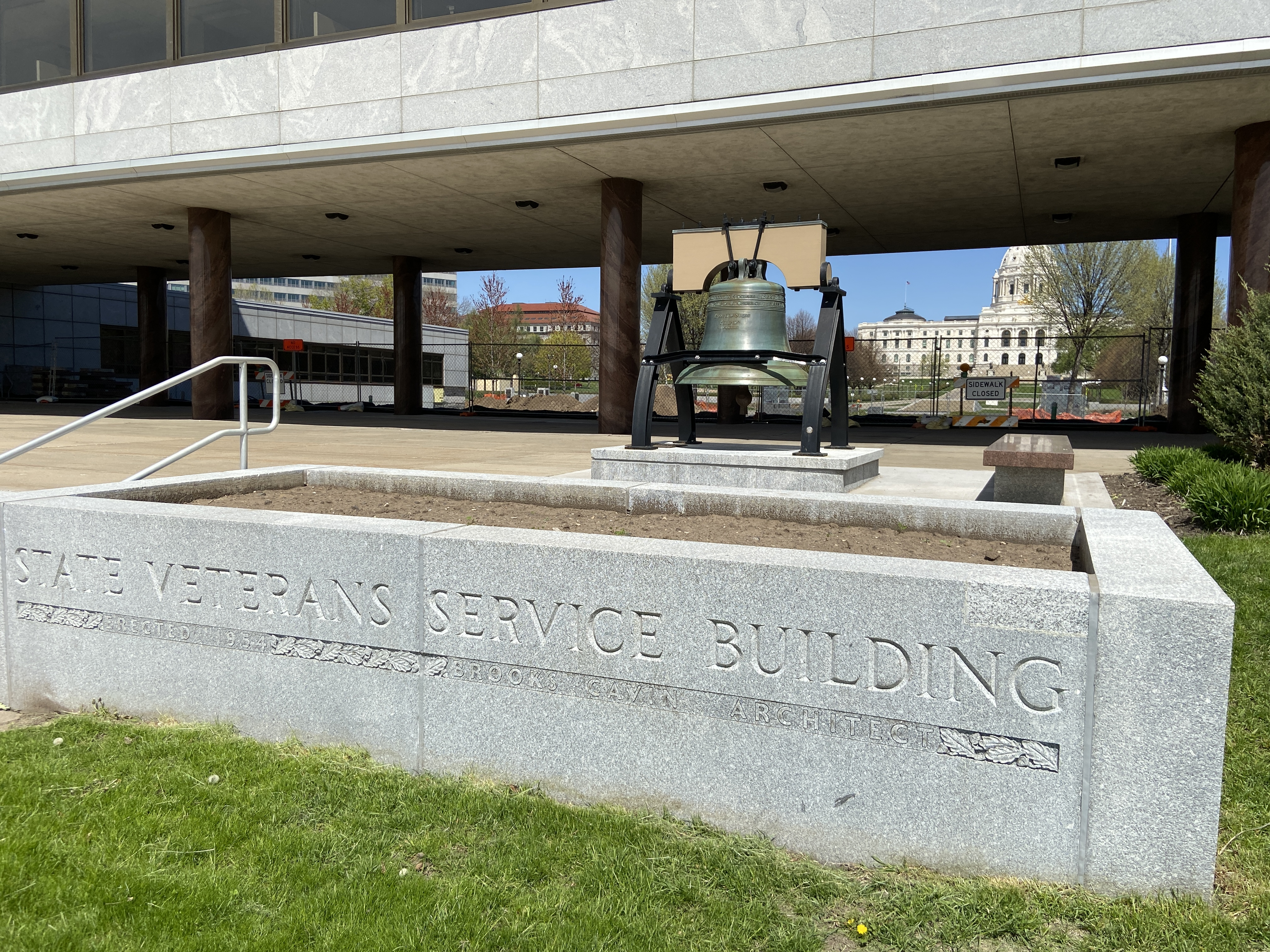
Liberty Bell

The Liberty Bell was one of 53 exact duplicates commissioned by the U.S. Treasury in 1950 as part of a United States Savings Bonds Drive and cast in France by the Paccard Bell Foundry. Made of cast copper and iron the bell weighs approximately 2,050 pounds. A faux crack was hand-painted on each bell. Bell and clapper are immobilized to prevent ringing.

- Dedicated: 1950.

=== Christopher Columbus Memorial ===
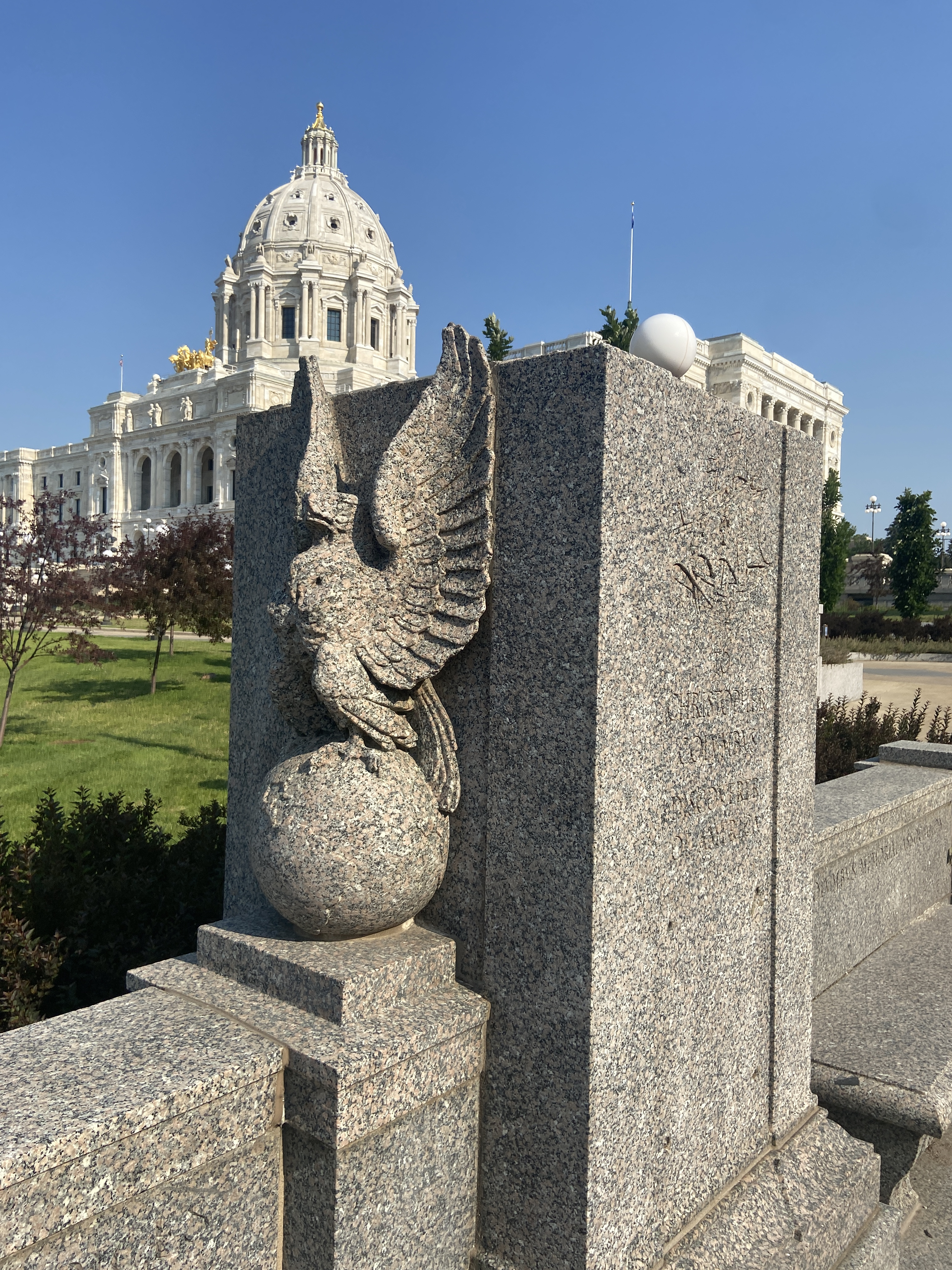
Christopher Columbus statue pedestal

Sculpted by an Italian immigrant, Carlo Brioschi and titled "With Ethnic Pride", the bronze sculpture of Christopher Columbus was presented as a gift from the Christopher Columbus Memorial Association to celebrate the achievement of an Italian during a period bigotry to recent Italian immigrants. To Native Americans the memorial promoted the myths of white supremacist and made no comment on the atrocities committed against Native Americans by Columbus. On June 10, 2020 members of the American Indian Movement tore down the 1931 Christopher Columbus statue located across from the Minnesota Judicial Center.

- Sculptor: Carlo Brioschi
- Dedicated: October 12, 1931
- Restoration: 1992

== See also ==
- Minnesota State Capitol
- Minnesota Governor's Residence
