= Martin Luther King (disambiguation) =

Martin Luther King Jr. (1929–1968) was a Christian minister and civil rights activist.

Martin Luther King may also refer to:

== People ==
- Martin Luther King Sr. (1899–1984), Baptist minister and father of Martin Luther King Jr.
- Martin Luther King III (born 1957), son of Martin Luther King Jr. and a former head of the Southern Christian Leadership Conference

== Places ==
- Martin Luther King station (disambiguation), stations of the name
- Martin Luther King Street, see List of streets named after Martin Luther King Jr.
  - Martin Luther King Jr. East Busway
  - Martin Luther King Jr. Avenue
  - Martin Luther King Jr. Boulevard (disambiguation)
  - Martin Luther King Jr. Drive (disambiguation)
  - Martin Luther King Jr. Expressway (disambiguation)
  - Martin Luther King Jr. Parkway (disambiguation)
  - Martin Luther King Jr. Way (disambiguation)
- Martin Luther King School
  - Martin Luther King High School (disambiguation)
  - Martin Luther King Middle School (disambiguation)
  - Lycée Martin Luther King (disambiguation)

== Film ==
- Martin Luther King (film), an Indian Telugu-language film

== Book ==
- Martin Luther King: The Assassination, a 1993 book by Harold Weisberg

== Others ==
- Bust of Martin Luther King (disambiguation)
- Statue of Martin Luther King (disambiguation)

== See also ==
- Martin Luther King Jr. Day
- Martin Luther (disambiguation)
- MLK (disambiguation)
