= Martin Luther King High School =

Martin Luther King High School may refer to:

- Martin Luther King High School (Davis, California)
- Martin Luther King High School (Riverside, California)
- Martin Luther King Jr. High School (Georgia) - DeKalb County, Georgia, Lithonia postal address
- Martin Luther King High School (Detroit), Michigan
- Martin Luther King High School (New York), New York
- Martin Luther King High School (Philadelphia), Philadelphia, Pennsylvania
- Martin Luther King Jr. College Preparatory High School, Memphis, Tennessee
- Martin Luther King Magnet at Pearl High School, Nashville, Tennessee
- Martin Luther King Jr. Academy, Gary, Indiana
- Martin Luther King High School (Chicago), Illinois
- Martin Luther King, Jr. High School (New York), Hastings-on-Hudson, New York
- Martin Luther King Jr. High School (Cleveland)

== See also ==
- Martin Luther King (disambiguation)
- Lycée Martin Luther King (disambiguation) for senior high schools/sixth-form colleges in France named after King
- Martin Luther King Middle School (disambiguation)
