= MLK (disambiguation) =

Martin Luther King Jr. (1929–1968) was an American civil rights activist.

MLK or mlk may also refer to:

- MLK, the Northwest Semitic spelling of Malik (king).
- MLK, the Phoenician spelling of the deity Moloch

== Transportation ==
- MLK, IATA airport code for Malta Airport (Montana), USA
- MLK, ICAO airline code for Nigeria's Millennium Air, see List of airline codes (M)
- MLK, on List of Amtrak stations, for Moses Lake, Washington, USA
- MLK, station code for Mooroolbark railway station, Melbourne, Victoria, Australia
- MLK Jr. station (Capital MetroRail), in Austin, Texas, USA
- MLK Jr. station (DART), in Dallas, Texas, USA

== People ==
- Manohar Lal Khattar (born 1954), Chief minister of Haryana; Indian politician
- Mary Louise Kelly, NPR reporter
- Martin Luther King Sr. (1899–1984), father of MLK II
- Martin Luther King III (born 1957), son of MLK II

== Other ==
- "MLK" (song), from the 1984 U2 album The Unforgettable Fire
- M.L.K.: Misery Loves Kompany (Tech N9ne album), 2007 album by Tech N9ne
- Ilwana language (ISO 639 code: mlk)
- Marxist–Leninist Struggle League, Marxist-Leninistiska Kampförbundet (MLK) in Swedish
- MLK, an alias of MAP3K13 enzyme

== See also ==
- Martin Luther King (disambiguation)
- List of streets named after Martin Luther King Jr.
