= Martin Luther King Jr. Freeway =

The following roads in the United States are named the Martin Luther King Jr. Freeway:

- Martin Luther King Jr. Freeway (Fayetteville)
- Martin Luther King Jr. Freeway (Portsmouth)
- Martin Luther King Jr. Freeway (Reno)
- Martin Luther King Jr. Freeway (San Diego)
- Martin Luther King Jr. Freeway (Greenville)
- Part of Ohio State Route 59 in Akron

== See also ==
- Martin Luther King, Jr., Boulevard (disambiguation)
- List of streets named after Martin Luther King Jr.
