= Martin Luther King Bridge =

There are many roads and bridges named after Rev. Dr. Martin Luther King Jr.

The Martin Luther King Bridge can refer to:

- Martin Luther King Bridge (St. Louis), over the Mississippi River
- Martin Luther King Jr. Memorial Bridge, in Petersburg, Virginia
- Martin Luther King Bridge (Port Arthur, Texas)
- Martin Luther King Bridge (Toledo, Ohio), over the Maumee River
