= Martin Luther King Jr. Parkway =

Martin Luther King Jr. Parkway may be:

- Martin Luther King Jr. Parkway (Jacksonville)
- Martin Luther King Jr. Parkway (Des Moines)

== See also ==
- List of streets named after Martin Luther King Jr.
- Martin Luther King Jr. Drive (disambiguation)
- Martin Luther King Jr. Expressway (disambiguation)
- Martin Luther King Jr. Boulevard (disambiguation)
- Martin Luther King Jr. Parkway (disambiguation)
- Martin Luther King Jr. Way (disambiguation)
