= Dr. Martin Luther King Jr. Expressway =

Dr. Martin Luther King Jr. Expressway may refer to:

- Martin Luther King Jr. Expressway (Portsmouth)
- New York State Route 440
- Interstate 65 in Kentucky
- Interstate 110 (Louisiana)
- Interstate 244

== See also ==
- List of streets named after Martin Luther King Jr.
- Martin Luther King Jr. Boulevard (disambiguation)
- Martin Luther King Jr. Drive (disambiguation)
- Martin Luther King Jr. Parkway (disambiguation)
- Martin Luther King Jr. Way (disambiguation)
