= Martin Luther King Jr. Way =

Martin Luther King Jr. Way may be:

- Martin Luther King Jr. Way (Berkeley)
- Martin Luther King Jr. Way (Seattle)

== See also ==
- List of streets named after Martin Luther King Jr.
- Martin Luther King Jr. Boulevard (disambiguation)
- Martin Luther King Jr. Drive (disambiguation)
- Martin Luther King Jr. Expressway (disambiguation)
- Martin Luther King Jr. Parkway (disambiguation)
