= Martin Luther King Jr. Drive =

Martin Luther King Drive may refer to:

- Martin Luther King Drive (Jersey City)
- Martin Luther King Drive (Chicago)
- Martin Luther King Jr. Drive (Philadelphia)
- Martin Luther King Jr. Drive (Atlanta)
- Martin Luther King Jr. Drive (Cleveland)
- Martin Luther King Jr. Drive (St. Louis)

== See also ==
- List of streets named after Martin Luther King Jr.
- Martin Luther King Jr. Boulevard (disambiguation)
- Martin Luther King Jr. Expressway (disambiguation)
- Martin Luther King Jr. Parkway (disambiguation)
- Martin Luther King Jr. Way (disambiguation)
