= Martin Luther King Jr. Boulevard =

Martin Luther King Jr. Boulevard may refer to:

== Streets ==
- Martin Luther King Jr. Boulevard (Fayetteville, Arkansas)
- Martin Luther King Jr. Boulevard (Las Vegas), Nevada
- Martin Luther King Jr. Boulevard (Los Angeles), California
- Martin Luther King Jr. Parkway (Jacksonville), Florida
- Martin Luther King Jr. Boulevard (Savannah), Georgia
- Martin Luther King Jr. Boulevard (New Orleans), Louisiana
- Martin Luther King Jr. Boulevard (Baltimore), Maryland
- Martin Luther King Jr. Boulevard (Atlantic City), New Jersey
- Martin Luther King Jr. Boulevard (Manhattan), New York City
- Martin Luther King Jr. Boulevard (Portland), Oregon
- Martin Luther King Jr. Boulevard (Eugene), Oregon
- Martin Luther King Jr. Boulevard (Austin), Texas
- Martin Luther King Jr. Boulevard (Lubbock), Texas
- Martin Luther King Jr. Boulevard (Miami), Florida
- Martin Luther King Jr. Boulevard (Worcester), Massachusetts
- Martin Luther King Jr. Boulevard (Yakima), Washington
- Part of Ohio State Route 59 in Akron

== See also ==
- List of streets named after Martin Luther King Jr.
- Martin Luther King Jr. Drive (disambiguation)
- Martin Luther King Jr. Expressway (disambiguation)
- Martin Luther King Jr. Freeway (disambiguation)
- Martin Luther King Jr. Parkway (disambiguation)
- Martin Luther King Jr. Way (disambiguation)
- Martin Luther King station (disambiguation)
