= List of streets named after Martin Luther King Jr. =

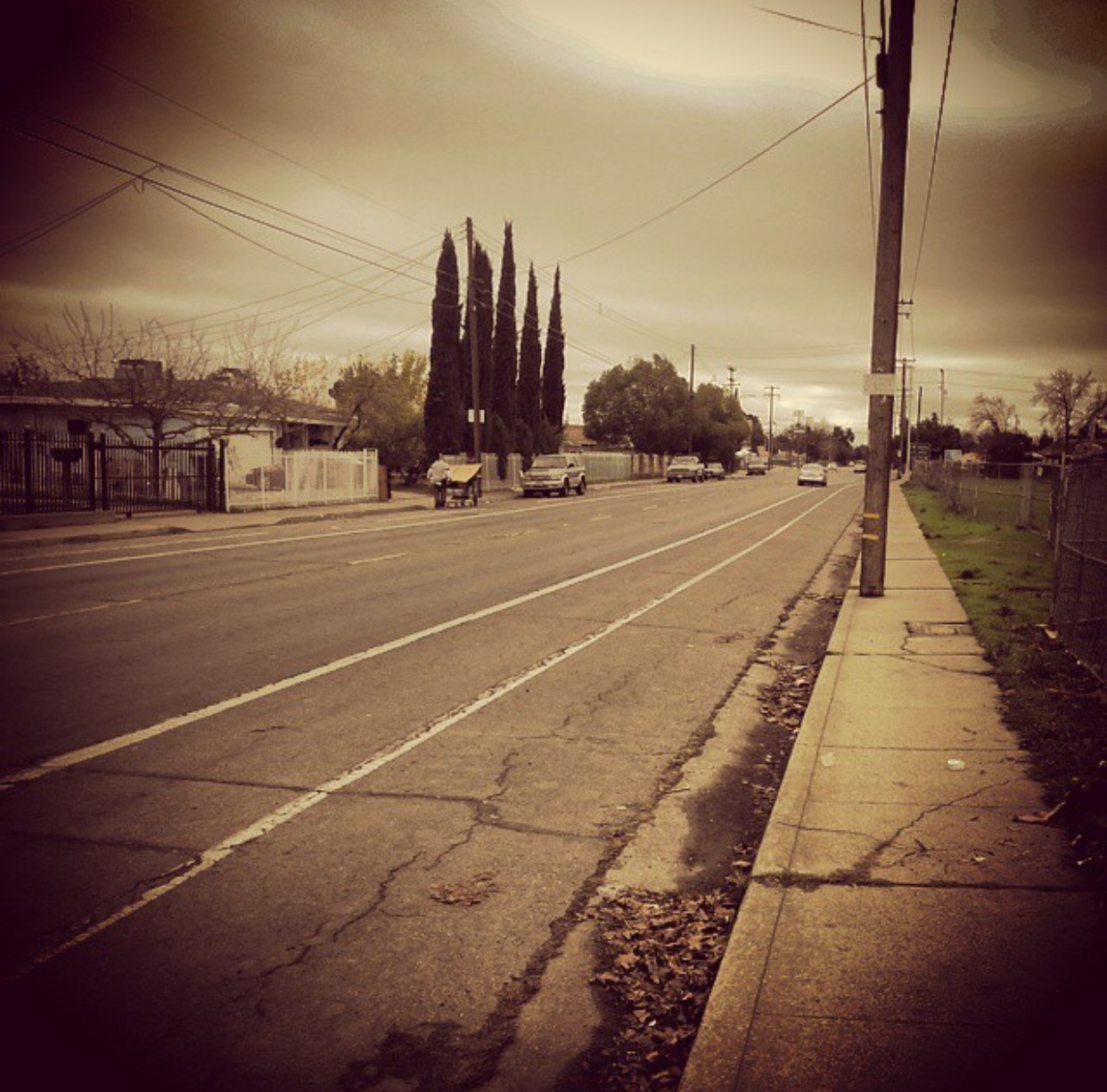
Martin Luther King Jr. Blvd. in Oak Park, Sacramento, California (December 2014)

Streets named after Martin Luther King Jr. can be found in many cities of the United States and in nearly every major metropolis. There are also a number of other countries that have honoured Martin Luther King Jr., including Italy and Israel. The first street in the United States named in his honor was Dr. Martin Luther King Jr. Drive in Chicago in 1968. The number of streets named after King is increasing every year, and about 70% of these streets are in states which were members of the Confederate States of America during the American Civil War: Alabama, Florida, Georgia, Louisiana, Mississippi, North Carolina, and Texas. King's home state of Georgia had the most, with 75 streets as of 2001; this had increased to 105 as of 2006.

As of 2003, there were over 600 American cities that had named a street after King. By 2004, this number had grown to 650, according to NPR. In 2006, Derek Alderman, a cultural geographer at East Carolina University, reported the number had increased to 730, with only 10 states in the country without a street named after King (Alaska, Hawaii, Maine, Montana, Nebraska, New Hampshire, North Dakota, Rhode Island, South Dakota, and Vermont). In 2014 he estimated that there were over 900 streets named after King in 41 states, Washington, D.C., and Puerto Rico. In 2019, National Geographic published an interactive mapping of more than 1,000 streets around the world named after King.

Business owners in the affected parts of cities have often filed objections (and in the case of Kansas City, voted in a referendum to reverse a designation) against streets named for King, arguing that naming a street after Martin Luther King would cause a severe decline in their businesses, associating violent crimes and homicides with a re-naming and claiming it makes the neighborhoods a King-named road passes through dangerous by proxy, though in many cases there is no correlation with that occurring.

The following is a list of streets named after King in the United States.

== Alabama ==
- Andalusia: A concurrency with US-29 and US-84 is designated Dr. Martin Luther King Jr. Expressway.
- Atmore: A 2.2-mile-long (3.5 km) thoroughfare on the east side of town is named Martin Luther King Avenue.
- Auburn: A section of Alabama State Route 14 is called Martin Luther King Drive, also known interchangeably as Loachapoka Road.
- Bay Minette: A portion of County Road 138 is labeled Dr. Martin Luther King Jr. Boulevard.
- Dothan: The portion of US 431 between Ross Clark Circle and its conjunction with US 231 is referred to as Martin Luther King Jr. Boulevard
- Huntsville: Dr. Martin Luther King expressway, located in North Huntsville and part of the Northern bypass. Also known as Alabama State Route 255 from Alabama State Route 53 to Pulaski Pike.
- Mobile: On Mobile's northside area, Dr. Martin Luther King Jr. Avenue runs from Congress Street in downtown Mobile up to the intersections of Craft Highway and Saint Stephens Road. The section was formerly known as Davis Avenue from Congress Street to Bizell Avenue, and Stone Street from Bizell Ave. to Saint Stephens Road.
- Montgomery: Dr. Martin Luther King Jr. Expressway is I-85 from Eastern Boulevard to the I-65 interchange.
- Opp: Dr. Martin Luther King Drive runs from College Street to Maloy Street.
- Prichard: A portion of Craft Highway between the intersections of New Bay Bridge Road and Wilson Avenue is designated Dr. Martin Luther King Jr. Drive.
- Scottsboro: Dr. Martin Luther King Jr. Street in Scottsboro runs north–south on the northwest side of town.
- Selma: In 1976, Sylvan Street was renamed Martin Luther King Street. King spent many days along Sylvan Street working for civil rights in the 1960s, especially by speaking at First Baptist Church and Brown Chapel. Brown Chapel is the background in a famous Time magazine photograph of King in the 1960s. Today, there is a monument honoring King in front of Brown Chapel. Brown Chapel was also the beginning of the route of the infamous Bloody Sunday march. Ironically, the street crosses Jefferson Davis Avenue, named after the president of the Confederacy.

== Alaska ==
- Anchorage: A 1.19-mile-long (1.92 km) thoroughfare running from Elmore Road to East Tudor Road was built and given the name of Dr. Martin Luther King Jr. Avenue in 2010. This idea surfaced in the late 20th century. Initially, some advocates aimed for renaming portions of 9th Avenue, however this proposal resulted in rejection in the hands of a city-wide vote. Some attempted to name the performing arts center after King but failed as well. Despite both of these failures, some proponents were persistent and still desired a street in Anchorage named after King and were successful in 2006 when the Anchorage Assembly approved the proposal of dedicating a street after him. Dr. Martin Luther King Jr. Avenue is seen as a reminder of King's legacy and position as a civil rights leader. Ten years after the opening of the street, in 2020, plans were announced to expand the avenue to Piper Street.

== Arizona ==
- Eloy: A three-block-long portion of West Second Street was renamed by the city council to Dr. Martin Luther King Jr. Street.
- Glendale: Maryland Avenue from 91st to 95th Avenue was renamed Martin Luther King Jr. Boulevard by the city of Glendale in 2016.
- Maricopa: M. L. K. Jr. Boulevard runs by the Copper Sky Recreation Center.
- Mesa: Martin Luther King Jr. Way runs along the Mesa Amphitheater between Center St & Centennial Way.
- Phoenix: Phoenix was one of the last major cities not to have a major street named after Martin Luther King, Jr. In 2015, a 13-mile (21 km) stretch of Broadway Road in the predominately Black and Hispanic South Phoenix neighborhood was unofficially renamed Dr. Martin Luther King, Jr. Boulevard between 67th Avenue and 48th Street. Broadway retains its original name, as the MLK Boulevard street signs are mainly posted at intersections with a traffic light.
- Sierra Vista: Martin Luther King Jr. Parkway runs east to west between Moorman and Arizona State Route 90, passing Veteran's Memorial Park.
- Tucson: M L King Jr. Way at the UA Tech Park at The Bridges (Tech Parks Arizona), south of 36th Street near Kino Parkway.

== Arkansas ==
- Bentonville: S.E. Martin Luther King Jr. Pkwy. runs approx. 0.7 mi. from S.E. 5th St. at its southern end, crossing E. Central Ave. (AR-72) and becoming N.E. Martin Luther King Jr. Pkwy., ending at N.E. John Deshields Blvd. at its northern end.
- Fayetteville: Fayetteville City Council voted in January 2008 to officially rename Sixth Street, which passes through the city's historically black neighborhood as well as the southern boundary of the University of Arkansas campus, to Martin Luther King Jr. Boulevard. Part of the road is designated as Arkansas Highway 180.
- Forrest City: The former Honeysuckle Lane in Forrest City was renamed Martin Luther King Drive.
- Hot Springs: Sections of US 270 and US 70 are named Dr. Martin Luther King Jr. Expressway.
- Jonesboro: Commerce Drive (Arkansas Highway 18 Spur/U.S. Route 78) between East Highland Drive (Arkansas Highway 18) and Interstate 555 (Joe N. Martin Expressway) was officially renamed Dr. Martin Luther King Jr. Drive in December 2019. Future extensions of Commerce Drive will be renamed in MLK's honor. An overpass on Red Wolf Blvd/Stadium Blvd (US Highway 49/Arkansas Highway 1) interchange over Interstate 555 was also named for Dr. Martin Luther King Jr. in August 2011.
- Kensett: East and West MLK Drive runs northwest–southeast through most of Kensett.
- Little Rock: In 1992, High Street was renamed Martin Luther King Jr. Drive. The street, which begins next to the Arkansas State Capitol building, is home to parades and community events. Martin Luther King Jr. Interdistrict Magnet Elementary School is located on the street.
- Malvern: US 270 Business Loop is named Dr. Martin Luther King Jr. Boulevard. It becomes Oliver Lancaster Boulevard when crossing into the neighboring city of Rockport. As the cities' boundaries meet multiple times, a driver can be on MLK Jr. Blvd., then Lancaster Blvd., then back on MLK Jr. Blvd. without ever turning off the highway.
- Texarkana: See Texarkana, Texas.
- West Memphis: Martin Luther King Drive runs from US 70 to Mound City Road. It junctions with I-55 and I-40 and is also where all the truck stops in West Memphis are.

== California ==
- Bakersfield: Dr. Martin Luther King Jr. Boulevard travels from California Avenue south to Brundage Lane.
- Chico: Dr. Martin Luther King Jr. Parkway travels north–south from a dead end north of East 20th Street to East Park Avenue.
- Fresno: South Martin Luther King, Jr. Boulevard in South Fresno begins at California Street (now Cesar Chavez Boulevard) where the street itself continues from Pottle Avenue and runs south to North Avenue. At this point upon leaving Fresno city limits into unincorporated Fresno County, it becomes South Fig Avenue, which was the previous street name in Fresno proper before it was renamed to MLK, Jr. Boulevard.
- Hayward: Martin Luther King Drive in Hayward travels north–south from Cannery Park to Winton Avenue.
- Long Beach: Martin Luther King, Jr. Avenue (shortened as Martin L. King Avenue) runs north–south in the Eastside of Long Beach between East 7th Street and East 21st Street. This portion was originally named California Avenue, although the former name is still in use; Martin L. King Avenue continues as California Avenue once it enters the enclave of Signal Hill before re-entering Long Beach, retaining the original name.
- Los Angeles: In 1983, Santa Barbara Avenue in the South Region of Los Angeles was renamed Martin Luther King Jr. Boulevard, three years before U.S. President Ronald Reagan signed a law to declare Martin Luther King's birthday a national holiday. That event was celebrated by the first ever Kingdom Day Parade; years later the event was made an annual tradition. It is typically held on the street between Crenshaw Boulevard and Western Avenue. Due to the length of Dr. King's name, the roadway name is often abbreviated as King Blvd. on its traffic signs and sometimes called MLK Blvd. Running east–west, MLK Boulevard begins as a major thoroughfare at Obama Boulevard (formerly Rodeo Road), running until Central Avenue. From Central Avenue, it continues as a residential street in two discontinuous segments due to the presence of Jefferson High School: between Central and Hooper avenues, and then from Compton Avenue to Alameda Street.
- Lynwood: A portion of Century Boulevard was renamed Martin Luther King, Jr. Boulevard within the Lynwood city limits.
- Merced: Formerly J Street, Martin Luther King, Jr. Way is the north–south State Route 59.
- Modesto: runs east–west from a dead end as Elm Avenue, then curves to run north–south as Martin Luther King Drive and sometimes abbreviated to S M.L.K. Dr. to change name to Sutter Avenue after crossing Paradise Road to a dead end on the west side.
- Oakland and Berkeley: Grove Street, which stretched for several miles north from Downtown Oakland into North Berkeley, was renamed Martin Luther King, Jr. Way in 1983–1984. Berkeley made the change by resolution of the city council on November 8, 1983. The street had once represented the dividing line between neighborhoods where minorities could and could not live or buy property. The street begins shortly before Embarcadero West in Oakland near the city's port, and continues through Berkeley until crossing over Codornices Creek, where it becomes The Alameda.
- Riverside: In November 1993, the Riverside City Council voted to rename a portion of Pennsylvania Avenue and Box Springs Boulevard to Martin Luther King Boulevard. It runs from Kansas Avenue to Interstate 215.
- Sacramento: Martin Luther King Jr. Boulevard travels from Broadway south to Franklin Boulevard. It is crossed by SR 99. It was originally named Sacramento Boulevard.
- San Diego:
  - Market Street was briefly renamed Martin Luther King Jr. Way by San Diego City Council in 1986, before being reverted to its previous name by ballot measure a year later.
  - In 1989, a portion of SR 94 was renamed the Martin Luther King Jr. Freeway, designated between I-5 and SR 125.
  - In 2010 members of the Broadway Heights community in San Diego renamed Weston Street after King. Martin Luther King Jr. Way is a one-block street connecting Charlene and Tiffin avenues.
- San Francisco: Martin Luther King Drive is one of two roads that run virtually the entire length of San Francisco's famous Golden Gate Park—the other is John F. Kennedy Drive. It was renamed from South Drive.
- Stockton: Dr. Martin Luther King Jr. Boulevard, a major east–west corridor. It runs from I-5 on the west to Main Street on the east near SR 99. West of I-5, it is still known by its former name, Charter Way. Charter Way got its name in honor of the charter of the City of Stockton. Before the street was Charter Way, the street was known as South Street.

== Colorado ==
- Colorado Springs: A freeway segment of US Route 24 is named Martin Luther King Jr. Bypass.
- Denver and Aurora: Martin Luther King Jr. Boulevard is a major street running through the eastern part of Denver, terminating on the west at Downing Street. It is a divided parkway that was formerly East 32nd Avenue. East of Quebec Street the street shifts slightly southward into the alignment of the former East 30th Avenue, passing through the Central Park neighborhood. At its eastern terminus, it follows the south edge of Bluff Lake Nature Park and then turns south into the alignment of East 26th Avenue, straddling the border between Denver and Aurora on its final two blocks before reaching its eastern terminus at Peoria Street.

== Connecticut ==
- Middletown: Dr. Martin Luther King Jr. Way is a one-block-long street in the heart of Middletown.
- New Britain: Martin Luther King Drive is the name for the section of Connecticut Route 71 between Main Street and Stanley Street.
- New Haven: Reverend Dr. Martin Luther King Jr. Boulevard, formerly North Frontage Road, is a westward one-way main entrance into New Haven, home of Yale University. The name was successfully dedicated in 2011 through continuous efforts by New Haven's Muslim alderman Yusuf Shah. Exits off of I-91 and I-95 take drivers onto the boulevard into downtown New Haven, which then terminates at West River Memorial Park. The road is also designated as Connecticut Route 34.
- Norwalk: Dr. Martin Luther King Jr. Drive is located in South Norwalk. It is one of the busiest streets in the area and many popular places are located on it, notably the South Norwalk train station.

== Delaware ==
- Dover: Martin Luther King Jr. Boulevard begins at Federal Street as a one-way pair that passes Delaware Legislative Hall before becoming a four-lane divided highway that crosses the St. Jones River and heads east to intersect US 13 before ending at Bay Road a short distance later, where the road becomes South Little Creek Road. On January 19, 2013, the city of Dover renamed Court Street, Duke of York Street, and William Penn Street near Delaware Legislative Hall to Martin Luther King Jr. Boulevard. Originally Delaware Route 8 (Division Street) was to be renamed Martin Luther King Jr. Boulevard, but merchants opposed.
- Lewes: West Fourth Street is co-signed as Dr. Martin Luther King Jr. Way. On February 28, 2020, the honorific street signs were unveiled in a ceremony.
- Wilmington: Martin Luther King Jr. Boulevard connects Lancaster Avenue to Front Street, traveling from I-95 to the Wilmington Amtrak Station at US 13 Business. It provides a gateway for the New Castle County suburbs to Wilmington's waterfront, downtown, and the transit hubs from I-95. Eastbound (inbound) lanes connect with Lancaster Avenue and form part of eastbound Delaware Route 48 (with the westbound direction of the route along Second Street), and are therefore able to draw from both exit 6 off of I-95, and the surrounding urban neighborhoods of Wilmington that lie west of downtown. Westbound (outbound) lanes of MLK Jr. Boulevard terminate at, and merge directly with I-95, providing a direct link between city and highway only. Wilmington Boulevard was renamed Martin Luther King Boulevard in 1989.

== Florida ==
- Bartow: Martin Luther King Jr. Blvd is a short two-way street that runs from South L. B. Brown Ave, crosses U.S. Route 17/98, and ends at Oaklawn Dr.
- Bonifay: Martin Luther King Jr. Avenue is a four-block-long residential street on the northeast side of Bonifay.
- Brooksville: Martin Luther King Junior Boulevard (formerly Summit Street) is entirely former County Road 581A (Hernando County, Florida) from US 41 to US 98/State Road 50A.
- Chipley: Martin Luther King Drive is in the northern part of Chipley.
- Clearwater: Martin Luther King Jr Avenue runs north–south in Downtown Clearwater, from Harbor Drive to Jasper Street. North of the Cleveland Street intersection, it is North Martin Luther King Jr. Avenue and south of the intersection it is South Martin Luther King Jr. Avenue.
- Crestview: Martin Luther King Jr Avenue runs east–west in Downtown Crestview, from Lloyd Street to Main Street. The street turns into Chestnut Ave, once east of Main Street.
- Dade City: Martin Luther King Jr. Boulevard was originally East Main Avenue from 14th Street to the Moore-Mickens Education Center.
- Fort Myers: Dr. Martin Luther King Boulevard (formerly Anderson Avenue) is Florida State Road 82, from US 41 near the Caloosahatchee River bridge east to I-75.
- Fort Pierce: M L King Jr Blvd (25th Street) is Florida State Road (SR) 615/N 25 Street/ M.L. King Jr. Boulevard.
- Fort Walton Beach: Martin Luther King Jr. Boulevard loops around the west side of Fort Walton Beach, ending near Northwest Florida State College.
- Gretna: Gadsden County Road 270 is Martin Luther King Boulevard for five blocks as it passes through Gretna.
- Inverness: Dr. Martin Luther King Jr. Avenue emerges from US 41 and lasts approximately 0.3 miles (0.5 km).
- Jacksonville: The Martin Luther King Jr. Parkway is a freeway bypass around downtown Jacksonville, carrying US 1 Alternate.
- Kissimmee: M.L.K. Jr. Boulevard, built in 2013, runs east–west from the end of Neptune Road to the Kissimmee Gateway Airport.
- Lakeland: Martin L. King Jr. Avenue replaced North Dakota Avenue, and is designated Florida State Road 563 between Sikes Road at Florida State Road 539 and U.S. Route 92.
- Miami area: North 62nd Street (East 9th Street in Hialeah) is called Martin Luther King Boulevard since he gave speeches all across the South, including the city of Miami. It is unknown when the road got this name. But some Hialeah residents say it was in the middle of the 1970s.
- Melbourne: Airport Blvd was renamed Dr. Martin Luther King Jr. Blvd between W New Haven Ave (US192) and S Apollo Blvd.
- Mulberry: NE 9th Ave becomes SE Dr. MLK Jr. Ave south of E Canal St. for about one-quarter mile (0.4 km) until it becomes SE 5th St.
- Panama City: Martin Luther King Boulevard replaces parts of Cove Boulevard and State Road 77.
- Port St. Joe: In the northern part of Port St. Joe, Martin Luther King Boulevard is a residential street running north–south for nine blocks. It forms an extension of David Langston Drive.
- Punta Gorda: In the most eastern portion of the town running north to south Featuring the Blanchard House Museum.
- Riviera Beach, Florida: In 1994, Riviera Beach City Councilwoman Bertha Orange, led the original effort to rename Blue Heron Blvd. as Dr. Martin Luther King Jr. Blvd., by collecting more than 2,500 signed petitions. Ultimately, the decision was made to rename 8th Street. On April 2, 1994, a ceremony was held to rename 8th Street to Dr. Martin Luther King Jr. Blvd. Since 2015, the highway intersects with renamed, President Barack Obama Highway. This marks the first intersection of these roadway names in America.
- Safety Harbor: 4th Street in Safety Harbor has been renamed Dr. Martin Luther King Jr. Street North, although it is an east–west street running about one mile (1.6 km) across town.
- St. Augustine: Martin Luther King Avenue runs from north to south through southwestern St. Augustine.
- St. Petersburg: The St. Petersburg City Council gave Ninth Street the additional name of M.L. King Jr. Street in 1987; in 2003, the street was fully renamed Dr. Martin Luther King Jr. Street.
- Sanford: Bevier Road in Sanford was renamed to Martin Luther King Jr. Boulevard in 2008.
- Sarasota: Martin Luther King Boulevard runs east from North Tamiami Trail to Tuttle Avenue.
- Springfield: 18th Street in Springfield is named Martin Luther King Jr. Drive. It runs north–south through about two-thirds of Springfield from Washington Street on the north, to Morgan Avenue at its south end.
- Stuart: SE M.L.K. Jr. Boulevard runs east-west through downtown Stuart.
- Tallahassee: Martin Luther King Jr. Boulevard runs north–south through Tallahassee, Florida. A portion of S. Martin Luther King Jr. Boulevard runs just blocks west of the State Capitol.
- Tampa: On April 11, 1968, one week after the assassination, Tampa became the first city to rename a street, with the city council voting unanimously "to change the name of Main Street, between North Boulevard and MacDill Avenue to Dr. Martin Luther King Boulevard in honor of the assassinated Negro leader." In 1989, the name was extended further eastward to include the entire stretch of Buffalo Avenue from Drew Park to Plant City was renamed "Dr. Martin Luther King Jr. Boulevard", also designated as State Road 574. Notable attractions include Raymond James Stadium.
- Tarpon Springs: Martin Luther King Jr. Drive runs across Tarpon Springs, from US 19 west to Whitcomb Bayou.

== Georgia ==
- Americus: US 19 through Americus is named Martin Luther King Boulevard. The city was reluctant to grant the name, until black community leaders threatened to boycott Americus businesses.
- Arlington: M. L. King Drive is a residential street running east to west nearly the entire length of Arlington.
- Atlanta: Martin Luther King Jr. Drive in Atlanta (King's hometown) runs east–west through the city. Beginning at the Chattahoochee River, it continues from Mableton Parkway in Cobb County, then runs through unincorporated Fulton County before entering the city limits. In Atlanta, ML King Drive goes through the West side, West End and downtown before reaching its east end at Oakland Avenue near Oakland Cemetery. The alignment of ML King Drive follows what was originally Gordon Road (SR 139), Mozley Drive and then Hunter Street. It is a major landmark for tourism, as it borders the Atlanta University Center, a conglomerate of historically black colleges and universities that includes King's alma mater Morehouse College.
- Athens: The Dr. Martin Luther King Parkway runs alongside a park along the North Oconee River in Athens. A previous plan to rename Reese Street after King was rejected by African American residents of Athens, who opposed having King's name associated with what they described as a "drug-infested" street.
- Augusta: Martin Luther King Jr. Boulevard serves as a connector, linking Georgia State Route 4 (known as Milledgeville Road southwest of this intersection and 15th Street/Ruth B. Crawford Highway north-northeast of it) with Old Savannah Road and Twiggs Street.
- Bainbridge: Planter Street is named Martin Luther King Drive, running east out to Old Whigham Road.
- Blakely: The Georgia State Route 39 bypass of Blakely is named Martin Luther King Jr. Boulevard.
- Butler: Georgia State Route 137 running north out of Butler is Martin Luther King Boulevard.
- Cartersville: M.L.K. Jr. Drive is an east–west street that crosses Joe Frank Harris Parkway north of the Market Square shopping plaza.
- Cedartown: US 278/SR 6 is named Martin Luther King Jr. Boulevard between US 27 Bus. and US 27.
- Columbus: Martin Luther King Jr. Blvd (most of which was renamed from Brookhaven Blvd in 1978) runs from 10th Ave (where it turns into 10th St) to Lawyers Lane, in which the road turns into Brookhaven Blvd.
- Davisboro: In Davisboro, 5th street is also marked "M. L. King Jr. Street".
- Donalsonville: Crawford Street east of Tenille Avenue becomes MLK Jr. Drive, running east–west out the east side of town.
- Gainesville: The portion of Myrtle Street through the center of Gainesville was renamed Martin Luther King Junior Boulevard in 2000 after women activists in town petitioned for the change. Businesses along the street had blocked this change three times previously.
- Griffin: US 41 is co-designated as Martin Luther King Jr. Parkway when it enters Spalding County from Pike County at the rural junction with County Line Road, southwest of Griffin's city limits, continuing north through the westside of Griffin, reverting to the single designation US 41 as it passes the junction with SR92 in northwest Griffin
- Ideal: Macon County Route 69 running west out of Ideal is named Martin Luther King Jr. Drive.
- LaGrange: A cul-de-sac residential street off of Colquitt Street is named Martin Luther King Jr. Court.
- Lexington: A cul-de-sac running north off Fairground Road is named Martin Luther King Drive.
- Macon: US 80 is designated Martin Luther King Boulevard, south of the Ocmulgee River.
- Milledgeville: Martin Luther King Jr Drive runs east–west one mile (1.6 km) north of the downtown area, running from Georgia State Route 22 (Glynn Street) to Elbert Street.
- Montezuma: Montezuma boasts a Martin Luther King Jr. Drive, a residential street running for three blocks on the west side of town.
- Perry: Martin Luther King Drive is a semi-rural residential street running north–south between US 41 and SR 224. It continues south out of Perry as Elko Road.
- Rockmart: Martin Luther King Jr. Street extends from Morgan Valley Road to West Elm Street.
- Rome: Georgia State Route 293 from Broad Street NE to Mimosa Drive SE is designated as Martin Luther King Jr. Boulevard SE.
- Savannah: Martin Luther King Jr. Boulevard is a major north–south thoroughfare on the west side of Savannah, running from River Street south to Exchange Street. It was renamed from West Broad Street in 1991, and was significant as being the hub of Black-owned businesses serving Savannah. A memorial bust of Martin Luther King, Jr., which was approved by the King family, was officially unveiled at Martin Luther King, Jr. Park at Plant Riverside District in Savannah, Georgia on January 15, 2022. The memorial is located at the terminus of Martin Luther King, Jr. Blvd., overlooking the Savannah River.
- Social Circle: Martin Luther King, Jr. is the name of the south-side section of Social Circle Highway.
- Sylvester: When Georgia State Route 256 enter into southeast Sylvester, it is co-designated East Martin Luther King Jr. Drive. While SR 256 terminates at Sylvester's Main Street, the Martin Luther King Jr. Drive designation continues as a Sylvester residential street for a further five blocks to the west.
- Thomasville: Martin Luther King Drive is a main residential street running north–south on the west side of Thomasville.
- Thomson: Martin Luther King Jr. Street is a main residential street in Thomson, running north–south, parallel to US 78.
- Valdosta: Martin Luther King Circle is a residential cul-de-sac about half a block long, off Bunche Drive.
- Warner Robins: Martin Luther King Jr. Boulevard runs from the Middle Georgia State University satellite campus east to US 129. It continues as Martin Luther King Jr. Boulevard east onto Robins Air Force Base.

== Idaho ==
- Pocatello: Martin Luther King Jr. Way runs through the center of the Idaho State University campus.

== Illinois ==
- Bloomington-Normal: Martin Luther King Jr. Drive connects Market Street (US 150 & Illinois 9) to Cottage Avenue, intersecting White Oak Road.
- Cairo: Walnut Street is also named Dr. Martin Luther King Avenue in Cairo. It runs from St. Mary's Park southeast to Jefferson Avenue.
- Chicago: Dr. Martin Luther King Jr. Drive (formerly South Park Way, and originally Grand Boulevard) features a tribute to the Great Northern Migration (a statue honoring the tens of thousands of Blacks who migrated from the Southern United States to Chicago) and a Victory Monument for the Eighth Regiment (featuring a statue of a World War I Black soldier). Simply referred to as King Drive by locals, it runs from Cermak Road (22nd Street) to 115th Street in the South Side. On the Chicago grid, it runs at 400 east. On the Stevenson Expressway (I-55), the exit before its split into Lake Shore Drive, Exit 293D, leading to McCormick Place is labeled Martin L King Drive. It was named in 1968.
- Decatur: Martin Luther King Jr. Drive runs north to south through the city of Decatur, paralleling Bus. US 51, a few blocks east.
- East St. Louis: US 67 is designated as Martin Luther King Drive over most of its length.
- Elgin: Elgin Bypass through the city of Elgin was named by State legislators "Dr. Martin Luther King Jr. Memorial Highway" in 2009.
- North Chicago: 22nd Street is named Martin Luther King Jr. Drive from Sheridan Road to Illinois Route 43 (Waukegan Road). Martin Luther King Jr. Drive is just outside of Great Lakes Naval Training Center and near Recruit Training Command (U.S. Navy boot camp).
- Springfield: 18th Street is named Martin Luther King Jr. Drive, forming a major north–south residential street in Springfield.
- Waukegan: Martin Luther King Jr. Avenue runs through downtown Waukegan between Belvidere Road and Julian Street.

== Indiana ==
- Anderson: Dr. Martin Luther King Jr. Blvd in Anderson runs north–south from Brown St in Downtown Anderson to I-69 in South Anderson
- East Chicago: Martin Luther King Jr. Drive, formerly Guthrie Street, runs from Michigan Street to Cline Avenue.
- Elkhart: Dr. Martin Luther King Jr. Drive in Elkhart runs east–west from Main Street to S. 6th Street.
- Evansville: Martin Luther King Jr Blvd. runs northwest–southeast from downtown in Evansville. The Ford Center is at the corner of MLK Jr. Blvd and Main Street.
- Gary: Martin Luther King Drive runs north–south on the east side of the city, connecting Tennessee and Ohio Streets on the north with 37th Street at its south end.
- Indianapolis: Northwestern Avenue was renamed Dr. Martin Luther King Jr. Street in 1985. There have been recent proposals to extend the name much further, replacing Michigan Road.
- Lawrenceburg: Martin Luther King Drive is a one-and-a-half block residential street on the northeast side of town.
- Michigan City: Martin Luther King Drive runs east–west in Michigan City from North Karwick Road to US 12. It forms the northern edge of Pottawatomie Park.
- Muncie: Dr. Martin Luther King Jr. Boulevard runs north–south on the city’s north side, extending from McGalliard Road toward downtown and featuring a mix of small businesses and residential areas.
- South Bend: Since 2017, Dr. Martin Luther King Jr. Boulevard has followed the former St. Joseph Street from Western Avenue to Lasalle Avenue (Business US 20) and a former portion of Michigan Street from Lasalle Avenue to Marion Street. This is a part of the former northbound route of SR 933. From 2005 to 2017, Dr. Martin Luther King Jr. Drive followed the former Chapin Street from Washington Street to Lincoln Way West (Business US 20).

== Iowa ==
- Des Moines: Martin Luther King Jr. Parkway (formerly Harding Road) originally traveled from Madison Avenue in the North Central part of the city south to Ingersoll Avenue near Downtown. Later, a new bypass was built just south of Downtown and was also named Martin Luther King Jr. Parkway. To connect the original parkway to the new beltway, an extension of the original street was built south of Ingersoll by constructing an underpass at Grand Avenue, bridges over the Raccoon River, and a new "T" intersection at Fleur Drive and the new Martin Luther King Jr. Parkway (beltway section). A left turn (to travel eastbound) is required at Fleur Drive to continue on Martin Luther King Jr. Parkway (Fleur Drive continues south). The new beltway extension of Martin Luther King Jr. Parkway is an east–west route that currently ends at S.E. 30th Street, east of the downtown area.
- Waterloo: Martin Luther King Jr. Drive on the east side of town, converging from the one-way E 5th and E 6th Streets as one leaves downtown, converging into a two-way road past Walnut Street. The road connects downtown and various east side neighborhoods to various industrial plants, including those for John Deere, Ryder System, and Tyson Foods.

== Kansas ==
The "Dr. Martin Luther King Jr. memorial highway" includes various portions:

- Coffeyville: A portion of US 166
- Kansas City: A portion of US 24 Fifth Street in Kansas City is also designated the "Rev. Dr. Martin Luther King Jr. Memorial Highway".
- Manhattan: North/South from College Heights Rd. to Ft. Riley Boulevard, running past Ahearn Gymnasium where King gave his last speech at a university.
- Topeka: A portion of Interstate 470
- Wichita: A portion of Interstate 135.

Also:

- Bonner Springs: Martin Luther King Avenue is a two-block east–west residential street between S. 136th and 138th Streets.

== Kentucky ==
- Ashland: Twelfth Street is also designated Martin Luther King Jr. Boulevard.
- Frankfort: Frankfort's Martin Luther King Jr. Boulevard travels south from US 60 and is designated KY 1659.
- Fulton: Martin Luther King Jr. Drive is a street in Fulton, from KY 129 to US 45. About half of the street is part of KY 307.
- Henderson: Martin Luther King Jr. Avenue runs from O'Byrne Street to US 41/US 60.
- Hopkinsville: US 68 Bypass is named Dr. Martin Luther King Drive.
- Lebanon: Martin Luther King Avenue travels parallel to US 68 and one block north of it through the center of town.
- Lexington: Martin Luther King Boulevard travels northeast–southwest in Lexington, from East 6th Street to Euclid Avenue. It crosses east Main Street, which divides it into North and South Martin Luther King Boulevard.
- Louisville:
  - I-65 in Louisville is named the Dr. Martin Luther King Jr. Expressway.
  - The one block stretch of street in front of the Romano L. Mazzoli Federal Building is named Dr. Martin Luther King Jr. Place.
- Paducah: Martin Luther King Drive is US 60 Business in Paducah.
- Somerset: Consists of Monticello Street and South Main Street between Oak Hill Road and South Richardson Drive, the bridge over the Norfolk Southern Railway is also named in his honor.

== Louisiana ==
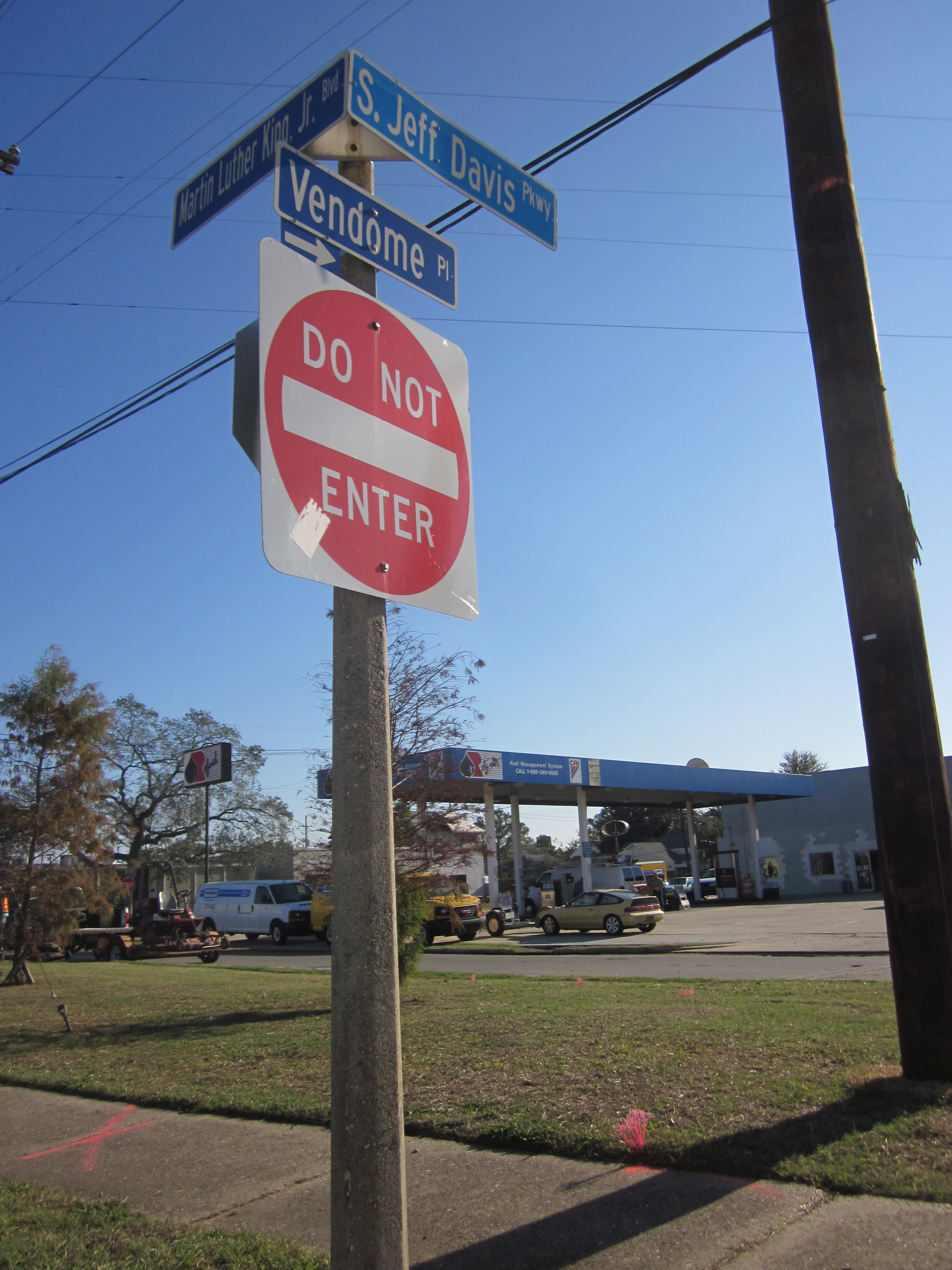
Intersection of Martin Luther King Jr. Boulevard and S. Jeff Davis Parkway in New Orleans

- Baton Rouge: Interstate 110 is named the Martin Luther King Jr. Expressway.

Deridder:Martin Luther King Dr, Deridder, LA 70634

- Farmerville: Martin Luther King Jr. Drive is a major north–south residential street in Farmerville.
- Hammond: Located in the infamous 212 neighborhood there is a residential block named Martin Luther King Jr Ave.
- Homer: The northernmost two blocks of Magnolia Street in Homer are named Dr. Martin Luther King Street.
- Lafayette: Martin Luther King Jr. Drive is an east–west street near the intersection of Interstate 10 and Interstate 49.
- Lake Charles: Named in 1982, the last few blocks of Louisiana Highway 14 are designated South Martin Luther King Highway, as it approaches its western terminus at a junction with U.S. Route 90 (Fruge Street). This junction is the southern terminus of North Martin Luther King Highway, which runs concurrent with U.S. Route 171. The highway runs thru northeastern Lake Charles, crossing I-10 and English Bayou, ending in Moss Bluff, where US 171 (there designated as Purple Heart Highway) continues north.
- Minden: Martin Luther King Drive is an eight-block-long residential street in Minden.
- Morgan City: Dr. Martin Luther King Jr. Blvd. Connects U.S. Route 90 to Louisiana Highway 182.
- New Orleans: Most of Melpomene Avenue was renamed Martin Luther King Jr. Boulevard. Several murals of King are painted along the boulevard. The boulevard is also near a King statue and memorial on Claiborne Avenue, and the boulevard is part of the route of New Orleans' annual Martin Luther King Jr. Day parade. The street is located in Central City, which is historically the city's largest African American commercial district and a major hub for the uptown African American community. The renamed section starts at its intersection with St. Charles Avenue where many Mardi Gras parades pass and ends at a 3-way intersection with Earhart Boulevard and S. Norman Francis Parkway (formerly Jefferson Davis Parkway). Melpomene Avenue between the Mississippi River and St. Charles Ave. retains its historical name, one of a series of streets named after the Muses of Greek mythology.
- Rayne: Martin Luther King Drive is the name of an east–west street in front of the city's Martin Luther King Jr. Community Center.
- Shreveport: Louisiana Highway 3194 is designated as Dr. Martin Luther King Drive. It runs east–west across the length of North Shreveport.

== Maryland ==
- Baltimore: Martin Luther King Jr. Boulevard begins at an exit on Interstate 395 and continues to Chase Street at Park Avenue. The original name of Martin Luther King Jr. Boulevard was Harbor City Boulevard. It was renamed in honor of King shortly after it opened. The boulevard separates the predominantly black neighborhoods of West Baltimore from the downtown central business district. It was mentioned as the dividing line of West Baltimore and Downtown in a Homicide: Life on the Street episode titled "Scene of the Crime".
- Prince George's County: Martin Luther King Jr. Highway begins at the DC–Maryland border at 63rd St in the District running from Seat Pleasant through Glenarden; also known as Maryland Route 704.

== Massachusetts ==
- Boston: Martin Luther King Boulevard travels 0.6 miles (1 km) between Washington and Warren Streets in Roxbury, Boston.
- Lowell: Martin Luther King Way runs from Tsongas Park at the Merrimac river to a traffic circle in Hall St. near the Western Canal.
- Worcester: In 2009, Worcester renamed East Central Street, the primary road connecting I-290 to the central business district, "MLK Jr. Boulevard". The highway signs for what had been the E. Central Street exit were replaced with MLK Jr. Boulevard signs on January 19, 2009, which was that year's observance of Martin Luther King Day.

== Michigan ==
- Benton Harbor: Northbound M-139 south of Main Street is designated Martin Luther King Drive.
- Detroit: Martin Luther King Jr. Boulevard (formerly Myrtle Street) travels approximately 2 miles (3.2 km) northeast to southwest from the M-10/John C. Lodge Freeway to West Grand Boulevard on the west side of Detroit.
- Flint: Martin Luther King Avenue in Flint begins in the downtown area (at 1st and Saginaw Streets) and travels north as a city street, then a four-lane thoroughfare to Carpenter Road, where it becomes Detroit Street.
- Grand Rapids: The former Franklin Street, a residential thoroughfare across most of the city's south side, was renamed Martin Luther King Jr Street in 2022.
- Lansing: The state capital of Michigan and also the childhood home of Malcolm X. A portion of the road is designated as M-99 or the Capitol Loop. Formerly called Logan Street (until 1994), Martin Luther King Boulevard travels north–south along the western side of Lansing.
- Pontiac: Martin Luther King Jr. Boulevard begins at Woodward Avenue (M-1) south of Pontiac, and runs around the city's east side, terminating northeast of the center of town, at Perry Street. It is divided into "north" and "south" sections, the dividing point being the intersection with Pike Street.
- Portage: Martin Luther King Drive in Portage is a three-block street connecting Constitution Boulevard with the Crossroads shopping mall.

== Minnesota ==
- Morris: Martin Luther King Jr Drive is located on the campus of University of Minnesota Morris.
- Saint Paul: Rev. Dr. Martin Luther King Jr. Boulevard travels in front of the Minnesota State Capitol. Renamed in 2002 from Constitution Avenue.

== Mississippi ==
- Amory: Amory's Martin Luther King Drive is a north–south street running alongside a residential area. It forms a northern extension of Gregory Road.
- Biloxi: Dr. Martin Luther King Jr. Boulevard is a mostly east–west street curving along its path and is located near the center of Biloxi. On its west end, it diverges from Reynoir Street, and on its east, it intersects with Howard Avenue and Dukate Street. Its distance from the beach varies, but the boulevard is mostly about one-half mile (0.8 km) from it.
- Carthage: Between Old Canton and Nollie roads, Martin Luther King Drive is a residential road, but becomes a rural road from Nollie Road to Chipley Road.
- Clarksdale: Martin Luther King Boulevard is a two-lane road extending from State Street on the east side of town westward through Clarksdale to Riverside Avenue, on the west bank of the Big Sunflower River.
- Cleveland: Dr. Martin Luther King Jr. Drive is a four-lane thoroughfare that runs north–south east of and parallel to US 278. South of White Street it is also known as Pearman Road.
- Columbus: Martin Luther King Jr. Drive is a north–south street running between 14th Avenue N and Military Road.
- Corinth: Martin Luther King Drive is a north-south residential street running from Wood to Meigg streets.
- Duck Hill: Martin Luther King Jr. Drive is a north-south residential street running from Main to Rosemont streets.
- Eupora-Bellefontaine: Martin Luther King Jr. Drive is a 10 mi road extending from Mississippi Highway 404 in Bellefontaine to Clark Street in Eupora.
- Greenville: Mississippi Highway 1 in Greenville is named Martin Luther King Jr. Boulevard.
- Gulfport: Martin Luther King Jr. Boulevard runs east to west, running through US 49. Approximately 2.5 miles (4 km) from the beach.
- Hattiesburg: A street one mile (1.6 km) in length that runs from an interchange with 6th Avenue, Eastside Avenue, and Hall Avenue to Bowling Street is designated Martin Luther King Avenue.
- Holly Springs: Mississippi Highway 178 is designated as Martin Luther King Jr Drive from Mississippi Highways 4 to 7.
- Indianola: US 49W through Indianola is named North Martin Luther King Drive.
- Jackson: Whitfield Mills Street, located in a predominantly African-American neighborhood, was changed to M.L.K. Jr Drive in the 1980s. This street, which intersects with Medgar Evers Boulevard at a Jackson landmark called Freedom Corner, is the site of one of the largest Martin Luther King Day parades in the nation.
- Lexington: A one-block portion of Cedar Street in Lexington has been renamed Martin Luther King Street.
- Moss Point: Martin Luther King Jr. Boulevard runs East to West, connecting Kreole Avenue and Magnolia Street, running through Mississippi Highway 63 and Mississippi Highway 613. It is also well known for gang activity and drug transactions.
- Ocean Springs: Martin Luther King Jr. Avenue stretches from its north point from a part of US 90 named Bienville Boulevard, and in its south extent it stops at Government Street.
- Oxford: Martin Luther King Boulevard runs north to south, in the heart of town, connecting Jackson Avenue to Molly Barr Road.
- Picayune: Martin Luther King Jr. Boulevard runs northwest/southeast from Jackson Landing Road to US 11.
- Rolling Fork: Mississippi Highway 16 in Rolling Fork is named Dr. Martin Luther King Street.
- Starkville: Mississippi Highway 182 through Starkville is named Dr. Martin Luther King Drive.
- State Line: Middle Road, running southwest out of State Line, is also known as Martin Luther King Drive.
- Tchula: US 49A through Tchula is designated as Martin Luther King Drive.
- Tupelo: The US 45 freeway bypass of Tupelo is named Martin Luther King Drive.
- Vicksburg: Martin Luther King Jr. Boulevard is a two-lane road circling the northern edge of Vicksburg, and ending on Confederate Avenue.
- Wiggins: Dr. Martin Luther King Jr. Avenue in Wiggins is a four-and-a-half-block-long residential street running east–west, just south of the center of town.
- Yazoo City: Dr. Martin Luther King Jr. Drive is a thoroughfare forming a northern extension of Main Street. As such, it runs north from 1st Street out into the adjoining rural area, passing Yazoo City High School and ending at Gordon Avenue.

== Missouri ==
- Kansas City: Paseo Boulevard was renamed to Martin Luther King, Jr. Boulevard in January 2019. After months of delay, Kansas City Council renamed The Paseo for Martin Luther King. On November 5, 2019, residents voted to remove the name and change it back to the historical Paseo.
  - There was also a failed proposal to rename Kansas City International Airport to M.L.K. International Airport.

As of April 2021 Kansas City, Missouri is no longer the largest U.S. city without a street named in honor of civil rights leader Dr. Martin Luther King Jr.

After a three-year battle, the city's parks board unanimously agreed to give Blue Parkway the MLK name Tuesday.

- Kinloch: Martin Luther King Boulevard in Kinloch runs north–south from North Hanley Road to Courtney Avenue.
- St. Louis: Dr. Martin Luther King Drive is a major east–west artery in St. Louis, running from America's Center west–northwest, becoming Missouri Route 180, St. Charles Rock Road, as it leaves the city. There is also a segment of it east of the Convention Center, near the Martin Luther King Bridge.
- Springfield: The Martin Luther King Jr. Bridge is located at North Benton Avenue.

== Nevada ==
- Las Vegas area: The section of Highland Drive north of Oakey Boulevard was renamed Martin Luther King Jr. Boulevard in the 1990s. The roadway connects the western edge of Downtown Las Vegas to the newer and more affluent parts of North Las Vegas. Via ramps to the road at the "Spaghetti Bowl" (I-15/US 93/US 95) freeway interchange near downtown, Martin Luther King Jr. Boulevard provides the most direct connection between the north-central Las Vegas Valley and the Las Vegas Strip. The road also passes through historic "West Las Vegas", an older and predominantly Black neighborhood. The city identifies the road as "Martin L. King Blvd.", omitting the Jr. and using L in place of Luther. Most residents in the Las Vegas Valley use the term MLK.
- Reno: In 1998, the stretch of US 395 passing through Reno was designated as the Martin Luther King Jr. Freeway, although, as late as 2020, there are concerns that there is inadequate signage with this name, such that the freeway is rarely referred to by it.

== New Jersey ==
- Atlantic City: Martin Luther King Jr. Boulevard runs from the Atlantic City Boardwalk to the intersection of US 30 and Route 87. The street was previously known as Illinois Avenue and featured in the board game Monopoly; it was renamed for King in the 1980s.
- Camden:
  - Interstate 676 through Camden between Interstate 76 and the Benjamin Franklin Bridge is called the Martin Luther King Jr. Memorial Highway.
  - Martin Luther King Jr. Boulevard is located in downtown Camden. The road travels from Riverside Drive on the Delaware River waterfront, with a view of the Philadelphia skyline, east to an interchange with Interstate 676.
- Egg Harbor Township: Martin L. King Avenue is a residential street spanning from West Jersey Avenue to Atlas Lane Road.
- Elizabeth: Martin Luther King Jr. Blvd. Across from City Hall. Elizabeth High School, Jefferson House is located on Martin Luther King Jr. Blvd.
- Jersey City: Martin Luther King made two speeches in Jersey City. Originally called Jackson Avenue, Martin Luther King Drive was named in his honor in 1976 and extends 26 blocks through the Jackson Hill and Greenville sections of the city. In 2000, a Martin Luther King Drive station of the Hudson–Bergen Light Rail was opened with Martin Luther King, Jr. Memorial and other public art related to King's life and the Civil Rights Movement.
- Lakewood: Dr. Martin Luther King Drive runs from Pine Street north to County Route 528 (Cedar Bridge Avenue).
- Morristown: Martin Luther King Avenue is a main residential street running north–south through central Morristown.
- Newark: Martin Luther King Jr. Boulevard traces the western edge of downtown Newark, separating the academic buildings of Rutgers and NJIT. MLK Boulevard extends from Bloomfield Avenue in the north to Clinton Avenue in the south. The street was previously named High Street.
- Trenton: Martin Luther King Jr. Boulevard carries southbound U.S. Route 206 between County Route 653 (Calhoun Street) and Route 31 (Pennington Avenue).
- Willingboro: Reverend Dr. Martin Luther King Jr. Drive runs from County Route 626 (Beverly-Rancocas Road) north to County Route 630 (Veterans Parkway).

== New Mexico ==
- Albuquerque: Dr. Martin Luther King Jr. Boulevard. A former section of Grand Avenue was renamed in 1994. The boulevard runs east–west between Broadway and University Boulevards (near the University of New Mexico campus).

== New York ==
- Albany: Dr. Martin Luther King Jr. Boulevard is a two-lane road running through Lincoln Park in the southern part of the city.
- Binghamton: Martin Luther King Jr. Promenade is a commercial street (formerly part of Henry Street) located in the city's downtown district, along the Chenango River.
- Hempstead: Martin Luther King Drive in Hempstead is a residential street of mostly multiple family dwellings, about four blocks long, from Circle Drive to South Franklin Street.
- Ithaca: Martin Luther King Jr. Street (also called State Street)

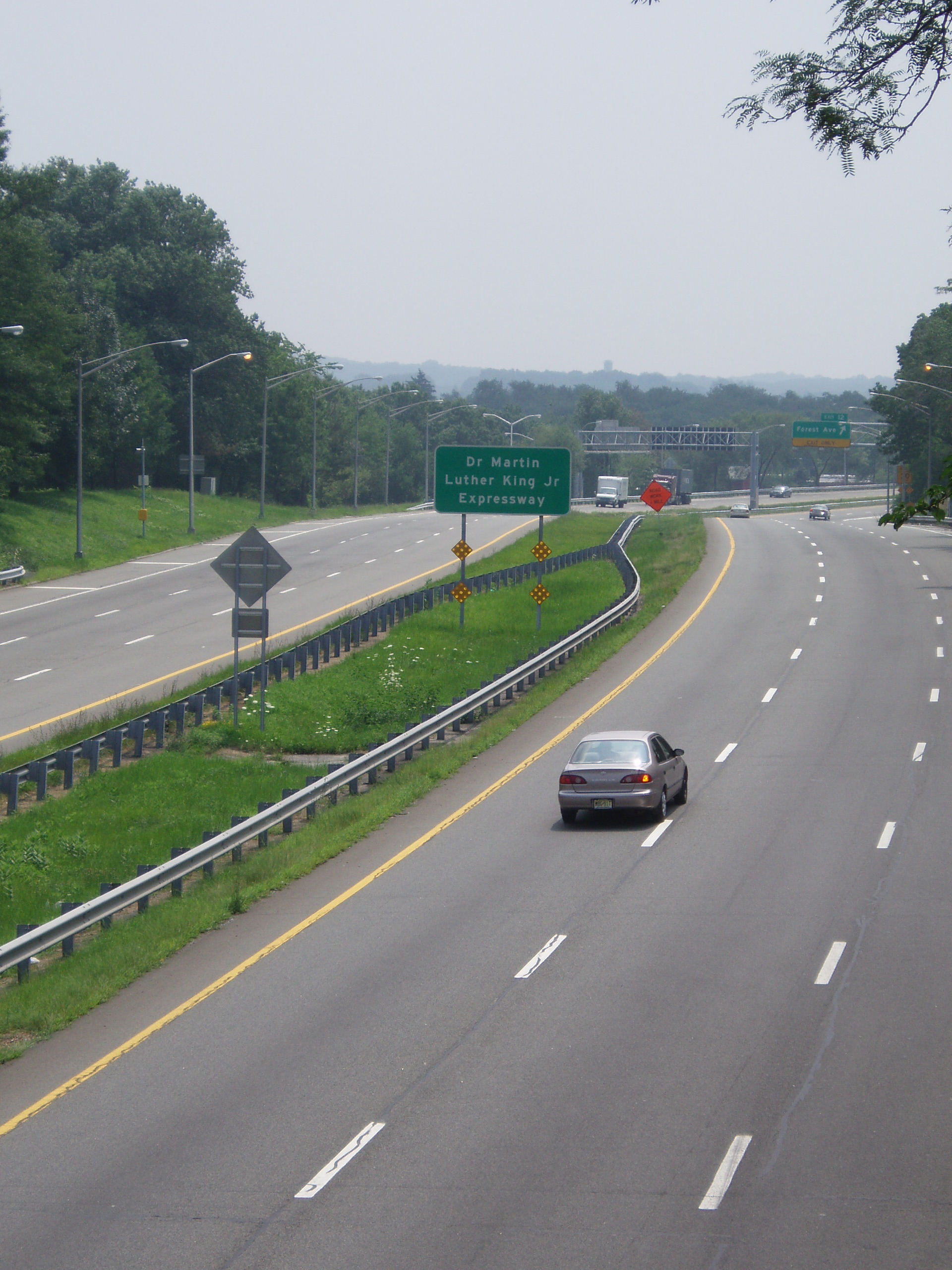
The Dr. Martin Luther King Jr. Expressway, Staten Island, New York

- Mount Vernon: Martin Luther King Boulevard is designated along East 3rd Street.
- Newburgh: Marine Drive, along the city's waterfront, was renamed Martin Luther King Jr. Boulevard during the 2000s.
- New York City:
  - 125th Street between First Avenue and 12th Avenue is designated Martin Luther King Jr. Boulevard (shortened by locals as MLK Jr. Boulevard). MLK Jr. Boulevard, which runs through Harlem, intersects with Malcolm X Boulevard at 125th Street and Lenox Avenue. The street features the Apollo Theater, a famous center for Black music and entertainment.
  - Martin Luther King Jr. Place in Bedford-Stuyvesant, Brooklyn
  - NY 440 in Staten Island, from the Bayonne Bridge to the Staten Island Expressway/I-278, is designated the Martin Luther King Jr. Expressway.
  - University Avenue in the Bronx, between Kingsbridge Road and Edward L. Grant Highway, is also designated Dr. Martin Luther King Jr. Boulevard.
- Syracuse: West Castle Street is designated as Dr. MLK Street West, from US 11 Salina Street west until it curves and becomes Hudson Street.
- Tuckahoe: Martin Luther King Boulevard (formerly Washington Street) runs from a dead end north to Main Street.
- White Plains: Dr. Martin Luther King Boulevard runs through the heart of the commercial district from Water Street to East Post Road in downtown White Plains.

== North Carolina ==
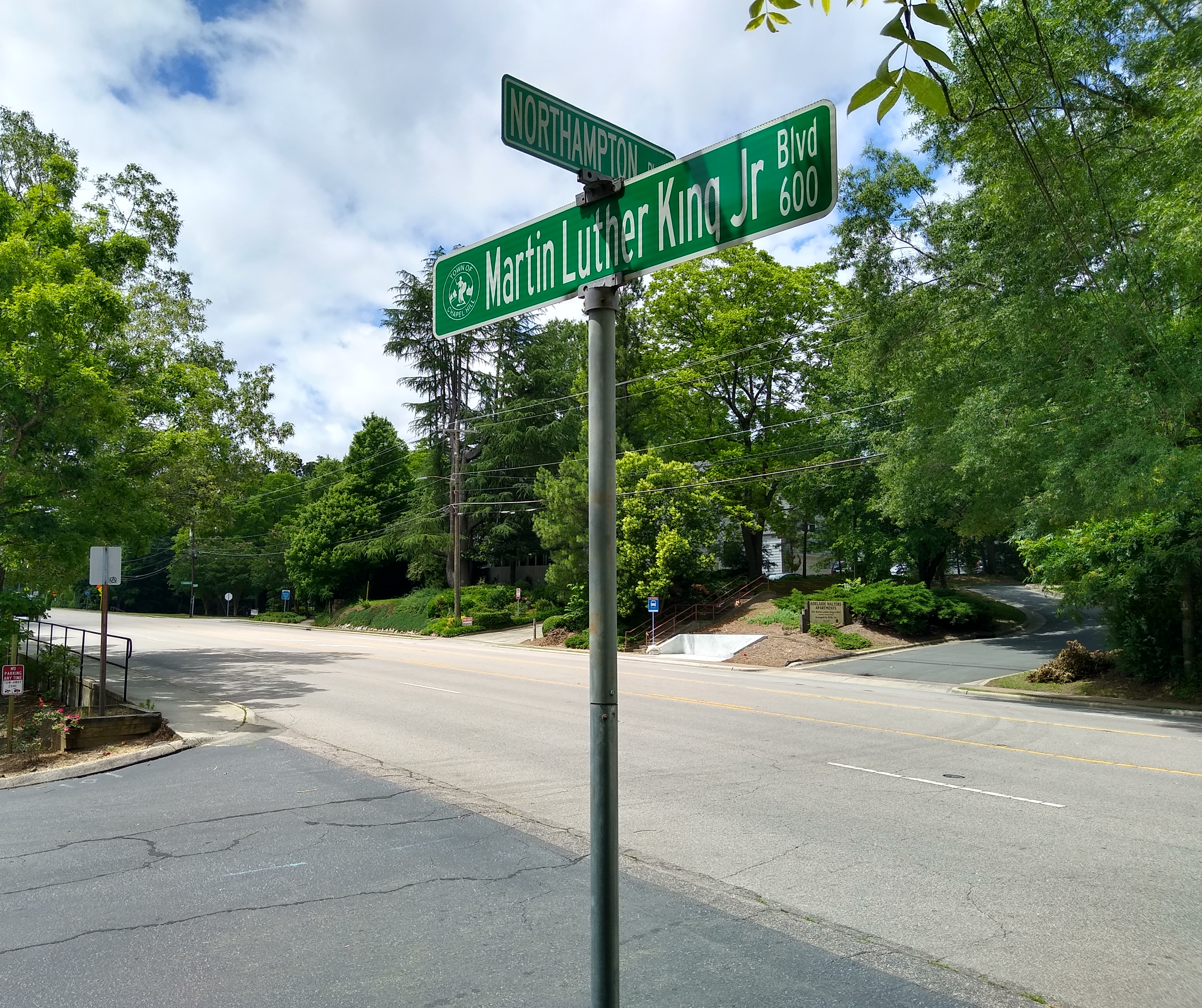
Martin Luther King Jr Blvd in Chapel Hill

- Asheboro: Martin Luther King Jr. Drive is a two-lane semi rural road which loops north from East Salisbury Street.
- Asheville: Martin Luther King Jr. Drive in Asheville is a southern extension of Town Mountain Road; it starts at US 74A and winds south through a semi-residential area to Charlotte Street.
- Ayden: A nine-block-long M.L.K. Jr. Street, running north–south.
- Chapel Hill: NC 86 north from the center of Chapel Hill is named Martin Luther King Jr. Boulevard. It was formerly named Airport Road. The street signs ingeniously list it as "Martin Luther King Jr. Boulevard" on a green background, with a subheading "Historic Airport Road" beneath, on a brown background, to show the road's previous name. In 2017, the "Historic Airport Road" sign was removed.
- Charlotte: In 2006, Second Street in Uptown was renamed to Martin Luther King Jr. Boulevard. It travels through what was once the predominantly Black neighborhood of Brooklyn, which was demolished in the 1960s to make way for expansion of the central business district.
- Clinton: Martin Luther King Blvd is located off Hwy 701/421.
- Durham: Martin Luther King Jr. Parkway is a four-lane divided road that travels 5.4 miles (8.7 km) from U.S. 15-501 to NC 55 across the southern portion of the city.
- Edenton: Dr. Martin Luther King Jr. Avenue in Edenton runs from the center of Edenton west to the US 17 bypass, forming a sort of business spur of US 17. It is Chowan County Road No. 1234.
- Enfield: Doctor Martin Luther King Street runs from the southernmost corner of Enfield, northeast for 13 blocks.
- Fair Bluff: A one-lane semi-paved cul-de-sac about a block and a half long, running off US 76 past some mobile housing.
- Fayetteville: The Martin Luther King Jr. Freeway, also known as the Central Business District Loop (CBD Loop), is a freeway in Fayetteville and the adjacent Gray's Creek Township. It is designated in part as US 401 and NC 87. This freeway has the credentials to be commissioned as an Interstate highway (such as I-395), but never has been designated as such.
- Gastonia: Dr. Martin Luther King Jr. Way forms the northern leg of Marietta Street. It runs north–south, from the center of town north to the city limits at the bridge over Long Creek.
- Greensboro: Martin Luther King Jr. Drive in Greensboro follows the route of old US 421 into the city from the south, ending at East McGee Street.
- Greenville: US 264 bypassing Greenville is designated the Martin Luther King Junior Highway.
- Lexington: In Lexington, West Martin Luther King Jr. Boulevard is actually on the southeast side of the city; it runs from the center of Lexington southeast to the East Center Street extension near an interchange with I-85. It is NC 8 for a part of its length, and Davidson County Road 2205 for the rest of its length.
- Maxton: US 74 Business in Maxton is Dr. Martin Luther King Jr. Drive.
- Monroe: NC 200, circling around the west side of Monroe, is designated as Martin Luther King Jr. Boulevard.
- New Bern: Dr. M. L. King Jr. Boulevard runs from Neuse Boulevard, in the center of New Bern, southwest to its junction with US 17. The boulevard forms part of US 17 Business in New Bern.
- Pinetops: Martin Luther King Street runs five blocks, from north to south.
- Raleigh: Martin Luther King Jr. Boulevard in Raleigh forms an eastern continuation of Western Boulevard, looping south of the downtown area, and going east to its terminus at Poole Road.
- Rocky Mount: Martin Luther King Drive is a residential street in eastern Rocky Mount, ending in a cul-de-sac.
- Rowland: Martin Luther King street is a major north–south residential street in Rowland.
- Selma: Dr. Martin Luther King Jr. Way in Selma is a residential street running four blocks near the center of town.
- Siler City: Martin Luther King Jr. Blvd is a two-lane road that begins in the city at 2nd Avenue and runs to 15th St. where it changes to Siler City Snow Camp Rd.
- Smithfield: Martin Luther King Jr. Drive runs from Broghden Road at its interchange with I-95, north for 11 blocks. It passes the south campus of Community High School, and ends at Harris Street.
- Tarboro: County Route 1518, running east out of Tarboro as East Baker Street, is also designated Martin Luther King Drive.
- Thomasville: Martin Luther King Drive is a semi-rural road running north–south on the west side of Thomasville.
- Walnut Cove: Martin Luther King Jr. Road is a short two-lane passageway through NC-65 and County Route 1908.
- Whiteville: Martin Luther King Avenue in Whiteville runs south to north, parallel to US 701. North of Burkehead Street it becomes N. Memory Street.
- Wilmington: US 74 is designated the Martin Luther King Jr. Parkway, from the Northeast Cape Fear River east to US 17 Bus.
- Wilson: NC 58 southeast of Wilson is designated the Martin Luther King Jr. Parkway.
- Winston-Salem: Martin Luther King Jr. Drive is a 3.7-mile-long (6 km) road that begins at the intersection of 8th Street and Trade Street downtown and reaches its terminus at Thomasville Road in the Southeast part of the city. It is predominantly African-American. The section between Liberty Street and Cleveland Avenue has been given the honorary name The Golden Mile. Every Martin Luther King Day, a parade is held on this street, marchers sing freedom hymns and carry signs calling for peace and social justice. It passes through the campus of Winston-Salem State University, a HBCU. Bowman Gray Stadium is also located on this street.

== Ohio ==
- Akron: The Ohio State Route 59 freeway in downtown Akron, the Akron Innerbelt, is also the Martin Luther King Jr. Freeway. Also, a part of SR 59 just after this freeway ends is known as Martin Luther King Jr. Boulevard.
- Cincinnati: Martin Luther King Drive is a major crosstown artery in Cincinnati. It connects the west side of the city to the east, running through several historic uptown neighborhoods.

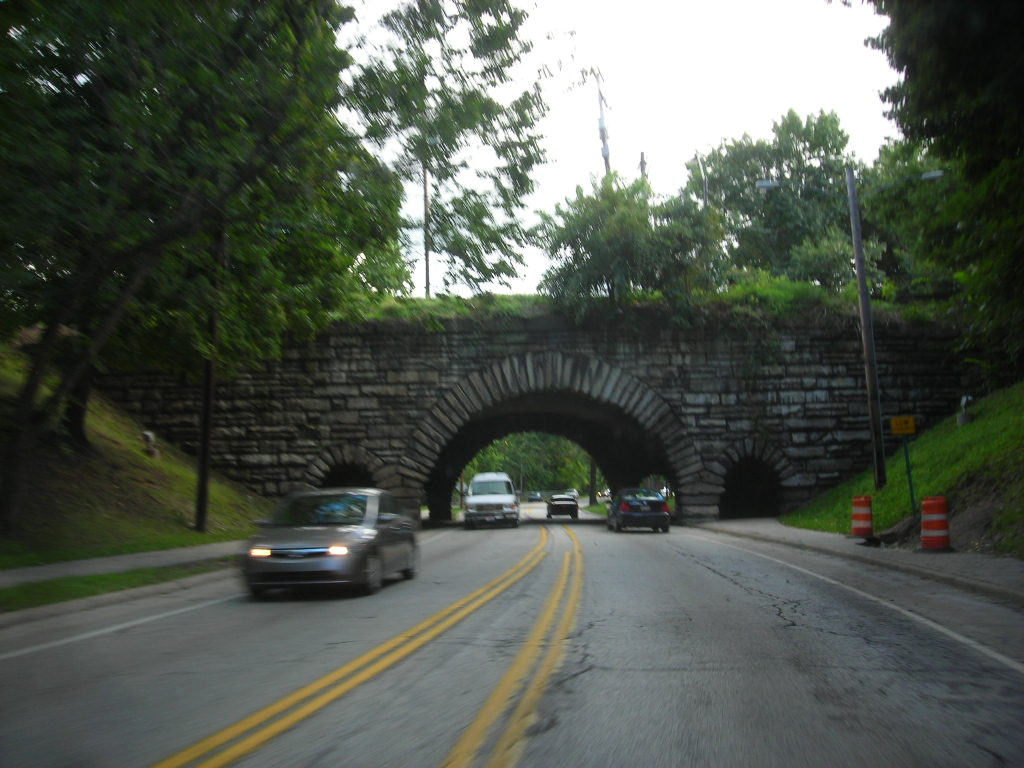
One of the overpasses over Martin Luther King Jr. Drive in Cleveland

- Cleveland:
  - A small portion which runs from Miles Avenue, changes its name to Martin Luther King Jr. Boulevard in the suburb city of Garfield Heights, where it dead ends. The largest span of the road is within the string of Cultural Gardens in Rockefeller Park.
  - In 1981 Cleveland renamed Liberty Boulevard, which had been named to commemorate Cleveland area soldiers who had been killed in World War I, to Martin Luther King Jr. Drive. The Drive's northern end is an interchange with I-90, near the Lakefront Park along the Lake Erie shoreline, weaving south through the city to Harvard Avenue. During the 1980s, Martin Luther King Jr. Drive was very dark at night, which is when most of the criminal activity took place. Currently, there are streetlights every 10–20 feet (3–6 m) along the parkway, as well as spotlights surrounding the nearby recreational areas. The parkway is known for its elegant old overpasses and is home to the unique Cleveland Cultural Gardens, the only public space in the world celebrating the ethnic diversity of Cleveland.
- Columbus: Martin Luther King Jr. Boulevard in Columbus is approximately three blocks in length, connecting east Spring Street and Mount Vernon Avenue, and running adjacent to Mayme Moore Park.
- Dayton: West Third Street carries the honorary designation Martin Luther King Jr. Way from just west of the Great Miami River, for approximately 3 miles (4.8 km) through the west side of the city, to the western edge of the city limits.
- Findlay: Martin Luther King Way is one of the nine streets that bridge over the Blanchard River in Findlay and ranges from the intersections of East and Main Cross Streets to Center and Blanchard.
- Toledo: Dr. Martin Luther King Drive forms a short loop around Children's Park in Toledo. Additionally, the Cherry Street Bridge, a double-leaf bascule bridge over the Maumee River, has been renamed the Martin Luther King Bridge.
- Warren: Martin Luther King Boulevard SW is a two-lane semi-rural road on the west side of Warren running south off W. Market Street.
- Youngstown: Martin Luther King Jr. Boulevard runs from the border with Girard to 5th Avenue in Downtown Youngstown.

== Oklahoma ==
- Langston: Running north–south from County Road 74/Sammy Davis Jr. Drive to East Commercial Street.
- Oklahoma City: The Northern section of Eastern Avenue, from E. Reno Avenue north to N. 63rd Street, was renamed "N. Martin Luther King Avenue" in honor of his impact on Oklahoma City and the nation. The avenue is the principal north–south road in Oklahoma City's Eastside section, home to the state's largest African American community. Prominent landmarks along the avenue include many of Oklahoma City's top attractions, such as the Oklahoma City Zoological Park, Remington Park, and Omniplex Science Museum. It is legend that King interviewed to become pastor of the historic Calvary Baptist Church in today's Deep Deuce Historic neighborhood, but church officials turned him down due to his youthful age.
- Tulsa: I-244 from I-44 west to downtown Tulsa is known as the Martin Luther King Jr. Memorial Expressway. Additionally, part of North Cincinnati Avenue was renamed to "Martin Luther King Jr. Boulevard" in 2012.

== Oregon ==
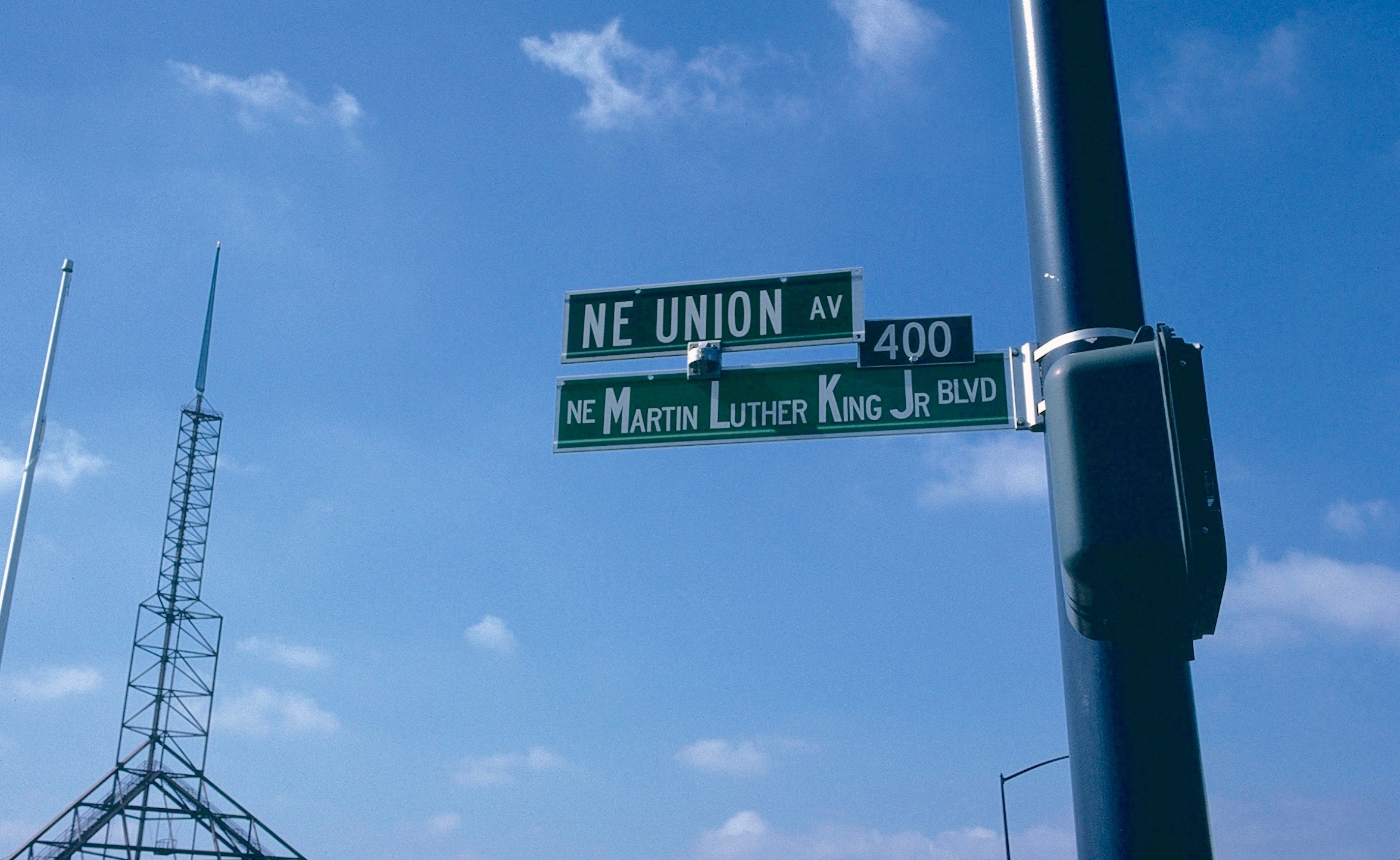
Temporary dual-name signage in place in Portland in 1989, shortly after the renaming of Union Avenue for Martin Luther King Jr.

- Eugene: Martin Luther King Jr. Boulevard forms a western extension of Centennial Boulevard, looping north of Autzen Stadium (University of Oregon Ducks football).
- Portland: Union Avenue between Delta Park and SE Division Street was renamed Martin Luther King Jr. Blvd in 1989. It carries Oregon State Route 99E and is a major arterial crossing the entire northern half of Portland, and passes through neighborhoods African-Americans were previously restricted to living in.
- Salem: Oregon State Route 99E in Salem at the northern part of the city was renamed Dr. Martin Luther King Jr. Parkway in 2022. In honor to civil rights activists like MLK.
- Springfield: Martin Luther King Jr. Parkway is the northern extension of Pioneer Parkway from the roundabout intersection with Hayden Bridge Way going north to the intersection of Game Farm Road then turning into Beltline Road.

== Pennsylvania ==
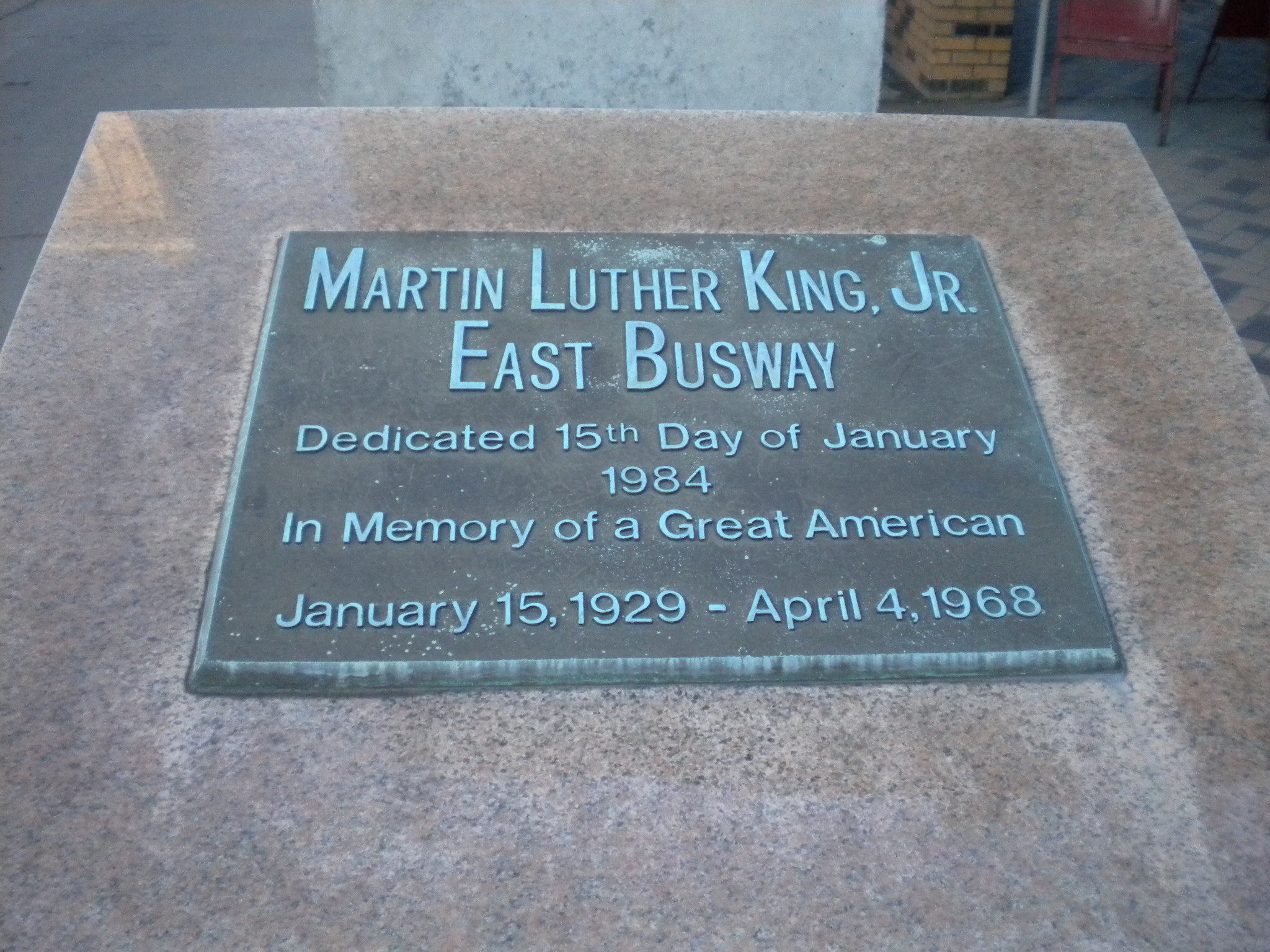
Plaque at Penn Station in Pittsburgh, dedicating the Martin Luther King Jr. East Busway

- Allentown: On August 1, 1992, Allentown City Council changed the name of Lawrence Street to Martin Luther King, Jr. Drive. The street, a scenic 2.6-mile (4.2 km) bypass of Center City Allentown, runs from West Union and South 4th Streets, continues along Little Lehigh Creek and ends at South 24th Street and Oxford Drive.
- Bucks County: The portion of the U.S. Route 1 freeway between the Pennsylvania Turnpike (Interstate 276) in Bensalem and the New Jersey border at the Trenton-Morrisville Toll Bridge over the Delaware River in Morrisville is called the Martin Luther King Jr. Memorial Highway. The road was designated by an act of the Pennsylvania General Assembly on November 21, 1988.
- Coatesville: On August 27, 2018, the Coatesville City Council approved an ordinance renaming the section of Harmony Street between 1st Avenue and 4th Avenue to Martin Luther King Jr. Boulevard; the name change took effect on September 27, 2018.
- Philadelphia: Martin Luther King Jr. Drive on the west side of the Schuylkill River in Fairmount Park (formerly West River Drive). (The former East River Drive is named in honor of John B. Kelly Jr.)
- Pittsburgh: The Martin Luther King Jr. East Busway, a bus rapid transit line, travels 9 miles (14 km) from Downtown Pittsburgh to Rankin via Shadyside, East Liberty, Homewood, Edgewood, and Wilkinsburg. It is used by an average of 25,000 people each weekday.

== South Carolina ==
- Anderson: Martin Luther King Jr. Boulevard swings around the west side of Anderson.
- Cheraw: Martin Luther King Drive in Cheraw is a one-lane semi-paved residential street running off Howard Alley, on the southeast side of town.
- Chester: "MLK Memorial Drive" is a residential street on the northwest side of Chester, just west of the Chester County Fairgrounds.
- Dillon: Martin Luther King Jr. Boulevard is a major north–south thoroughfare in Dillon. Forming the north part of Third Avenue, it runs north to SC 57.
- Greenville: A portion of SC 291 and US 25 in Greenville is designated as the Dr. Martin Luther King Jr. Memorial Highway.
- Gresham: Martin Luther King Jr. Road in Gresham is a semi rural road running east from SC 908.
- Hartsville: Martin Luther King Drive runs north–south in the southwest part of Hartsville, from Washington Street to a point just south of Russell Road.
- Hopkins: Martin Luther King Boulevard is a two-lane rural road running north–south along the east side of Hopkins.
- Marion: Martin Luther King Drive is a semi-rural road running along the south side of Marion, from South Main Street to Mill Street.
- Pawleys Island: Martin Luther King Road runs east–west in Pawley's Island, from US 17 almost to King's River Road.
- Starr: Martin Luther King Road is a cul-de-sac running north off Charles Reed Road.
- Union: Reverend Martin Luther King Jr. Memorial Highway runs from the intersection of Industrial Park Road and Highway 49 West to the intersection of Union Boulevard and Highway 49 East.

== Tennessee ==
- Bristol: Martin Luther King Boulevard begins in Bristol, Tennessee, as a northern continuation of Edgemont Avenue. It runs north and becomes part of US 421, crossing into Virginia, where the US 421 designation turns off. At this point, it becomes Virginia State Route 113, and ends on Moore Street just south of US 11. This is one of two streets named after King which crosses a line between two states (the other is in Texarkana, Texas/Arkansas).
- Chattanooga: Martin Luther King Boulevard is a main east–west thoroughfare in central Chattanooga, running from the Riverfront Parkway east to its continuation as Bailey Avenue. For a part of its length it is designated Tennessee State Route 2.
- Jackson: Dr. Martin Luther King Drive is an 8-block east–west street on the southeast side of Jackson.
- Knoxville: Martin Luther King Jr. Avenue travels northeast to southwest for a distance of 2.8 miles (4.5 km) on the east side of Knoxville.
- Memphis: A portion of the Interstate 240/Interstate 40 loop from Interstate 55 to Sam Cooper Boulevard is named the Dr. Martin Luther King Jr. Expressway. In addition, Linden Avenue between S Pauline St and Front Street is named Dr. Martin Luther King Jr. Boulevard.
- Morristown: On the west side of town, SR 66 is called Dr. Martin Luther King Boulevard.
- Murfreesboro: On May 19, 2021, Mercury Boulevard was renamed to Dr. Martin Luther King Jr. Blvd.
- Nashville: On April 3, 2018, the city of Nashville renamed Charlotte Avenue from George L. Davis Boulevard east to Third Avenue to Dr. Martin Luther King Jr. Boulevard.
- New Market: Martin Luther King Drive is a one-lane residential cul-de-sac, running north from Indian Cave Road, in the northwest corner of New Market.

== Texas ==
- Alice: Martin Luther King Road is a semirural highway running north from BUS US 281 to Front Street.
- Amarillo: Northeast/Northwest 24th Avenue runs east–west in the northern portion of Amarillo, and carries the unofficial Martin Luther King Boulevard designation through posted signage.
- Arlington: Center Street is co-signed as Rev. Dr. Martin Luther King Jr. Boulevard from Randol Mill Road to Pioneer Parkway (Spur 303). The road runs north–south and passes through Downtown Arlington and the University of Texas at Arlington.
- Austin: Martin Luther King Jr. Boulevard (formerly 19th Street) is a major east–west roadway bordering the University of Texas in Austin. Beginning at Lamar Boulevard, it runs between downtown and the University of Texas at Austin campus initially, then continues as Webberville Road (FM 969) in far east Austin.
- Beaumont: Martin Luther King Parkway is the name of Spur 380, a north–south highway which borders Downtown Beaumont and passes through Lamar University.
- Bryan Martin Luther King, Jr. Street (formerly 19th Street) runs east–west in the northern portion of Bryan, ending at SH 6 where it continues as Old Reliance Road.
- Cleveland: Martin Luther King Drive is a residential street about 0.6 miles (1 km) in length, running east from North Travis Avenue.
- Dallas: Martin Luther King Jr. Boulevard is a major street in South Dallas, running from Fair Park to just before South Lamar Street, where it becomes Cedar Crest Boulevard and crosses the Trinity River into Oak Cliff. In the middle of its length, Martin Luther King Jr. Boulevard intersects with Malcolm X Boulevard (formerly Oakland Avenue), another major South Dallas street. It was originally Forest Avenue until its renaming in 1981.
- El Paso: Farm to Market Road 3255 is designated as Martin Luther King Jr Blvd and runs from the Patriot Freeway and Kentworthy St to the Texas/New Mexico border.
- Fort Worth: US 287 is designated as the Dr. Martin Luther King Jr. Freeway from Downtown Fort Worth to Interstate 820. It was originally called Poly Freeway.
- Galveston: The entirety of 29th Street is known as Martin Luther King Street from Seawall Boulevard to Harborside Drive. It is one of two streets in Galveston named after prominent African Americans - another street (41st Street) is named for former heavyweight champion Jack Johnson.
- Gainesville: Martin Luther King Avenue is a small street less than one-half mile (0.8 km) long.
- Giddings: US 77 is designated as the Martin Luther King Memorial Highway within the Giddings city limits.
- Greenville: Interstate 30 is designated as Martin Luther King Jr. Freeway through the city of Greenville between exits 92 and 97.
- Houston: Martin Luther King Boulevard (formerly South Park Boulevard until 1976) travels from a short distance north of Wheeler Avenue near the University of Houston south to Orem Drive through the predominantly black neighborhoods of South Park, Sunnyside, and South Acres. The boulevard is proposed to be extended further southward to Houston's Texas State Highway Beltway 8.
- Lubbock: Martin Luther King Jr. Boulevard is a north–south road paralleling Interstate 27/U.S. Route 87 from Lubbock Preston Smith International Airport to near the Lubbock Executive Airpark, approximately 1.5 miles (2.4 km) south of the intersection of South Loop 289 and U.S. Route 84. It was originally called Quirt Avenue until 1993 when the street name change was motivated by perception that "quirt", a Spanish whip, had negative connotations.
- Midland: Martin Luther King Circle
- Orange: Martin Luther King Drive is a north–south road that intersects Interstate 10 on the west side of the city.
- Port Arthur: Texas State Highway 82 is locally designated as Martin Luther King, Jr. Drive, running northwest‐southeast from Texas State Highway 73 to the Martin Luther King Bridge (formerly Gulfgate Bridge) where it crosses the Intracoastal Waterway.
- San Antonio: Martin Luther King Drive (formerly Nebraska St.) starts out as a neighborhood street at Claude W. Black and ends at Palmetto Street which it merges into Pittman-Sullivan Park. Then, Martin Luther King Drive travels from South New Braunfels Avenue to W.W. White Road. Martin Luther King Drive is located on San Antonio's east side, which is one of two predominantly African American areas of San Antonio, the other being northeast San Antonio. St. Phillips College, a community college, now a HBCU, is also located on Martin Luther King Drive. It is crossed by I-10, where it meets Martin Luther King Park, which holds one of the largest Martin Luther King Day parades in the United States.
- San Marcos: Dr. Martin Luther King, Jr. Drive is a two-lane street that runs through the Dunbar Historic District starting at its unique juncture with one-way LBJ Street. A memorial installation stands at this Crossroads in recognition of the civil rights legislation enacted by LBJ informed by his many interactions with MLK. LBJ is an alumnus of Texas State University, located in San Marcos. MLK Drive runs through the Dunbar Historic District—an historically African American neighborhood. To be visited on this street are the Historic Calaboose African American History Museum, the Eddie Durham Park, the historic Cephas House and further along is the Paul Laurence Dunbar Center, named for the African American Poet. At the Dunbar Center are basketball courts dedicated to Olympic Gold Medal Basketball great Lucious Jackson, who was born and raised in San Marcos.
- Texarkana: Dr. Martin Luther King Jr. Boulevard is a one-way thoroughfare carrying US 67 westbound. It occupies the position of 8th Street in Texarkana's numbered-street grid (US 67 eastbound is carried by 7th Street). This is one of two streets named after King that crosses a line between two states (The other is in Bristol, Tennessee/Virginia).
- Waco: Lake Brazos Parkway was renamed in 1995 to Martin Luther King, Jr. Boulevard, running alongside the Brazos River northeast of downtown for most of its length.
- Wichita Falls: In 2006, the city renamed Eastside Drive to Martin Luther King Jr. Boulevard from Burkburnett Road to East Scott Avenue. Many businesses along the road have the name Eastside in reference to their location by the street's previous name.

== Utah ==
- Ogden (honorary only): 24th Street between G Avenue and Jefferson Avenue has been designated the honorary name "Martin Luther King Jr. Street". Postal addresses remain 24th Street; "Martin Luther King Jr. Street" is not accepted by the USPS
- Salt Lake City (honorary only): Street signs for 600 South running west to east through Salt Lake City bear the honorary name "Martin Luther King Jr. Boulevard". Postal addresses remain 600 South; "Martin Luther King Jr. Boulevard" is not accepted by the USPS.

== Virginia ==
- Bedford: Martin Luther King Jr. Bypass is the freeway portion of US 460 from its interchange with E Main Street (westbound US 460 Business) to its interchange with Blue Ridge Avenue (eastbound US 460 Business).
- Bristol: See Bristol, Tennessee.
- Hampton: Martin Luther King Jr. Boulevard runs from Franklin Boulevard north, skirting the grounds of the Hampton VA Medical Center.
- Harrisonburg: Martin Luther King Jr. Way loops around the south side of Harrisonburg, from US 33 on its east end, to Virginia State Route 42 at its western terminus.
- Louisa: Louisa honors King's memory with Martin Luther King Lane, a short cul-de-sac running north off West Street.
- Lynchburg: A corridor of VA 163, from the southern end of Memorial Avenue down to the John Lynch Memorial Bridge is signed as Martin Luther King Jr. Boulevard.
- Norfolk and Portsmouth: US 58 is designated the Martin Luther King Jr. Expressway as it passes through the two-lane Midtown Tunnel, then south through Portsmouth.
- Petersburg: Martin Luther King Drive runs south off East River Road on the west side of Petersburg.
- Spring Grove: Virginia State Route 40 south out of Spring Grove is designated the Martin Luther King Highway.

== Washington ==
- Bainbridge Island: In 2013, the City of Bainbridge Island dedicated Martin Luther King Jr. Lane by the high school.
- Bremerton: Dr. ML King Way is north of and runs parallel to 6th street.
- Seattle: In 1983, an 8-mile-long (13 km) stretch of State Route 900 between Seattle and Renton was renamed from Empire Way to Martin Luther King Jr. Way. At the time the area was roughly 70 percent black. Seattle is also the seat for King County, whose namesake was switched from William Rufus King to Martin Luther King Jr. in 1986, a decision legally enshrined by the state in 2005.
- Spokane: East Martin Luther King Jr. Way is four blocks long, and runs east and west from North Division Street to North Sherman Street. It is also located one block south of East Main Avenue, and is just east of the downtown corridor.
- Tacoma: The area of K Street, from South 27th to Division Streets, within the neighborhood commonly referred to as "Hilltop", was renamed Martin Luther King Jr. Way in 1993.
- Yakima: Martin Luther King Jr. Boulevard runs through Downtown Yakima. The western terminus of the boulevard is at North Pierce Avenue. The eastern terminus is at the roundabout with East Lincoln Avenue and B Street.

== Washington, D.C. ==
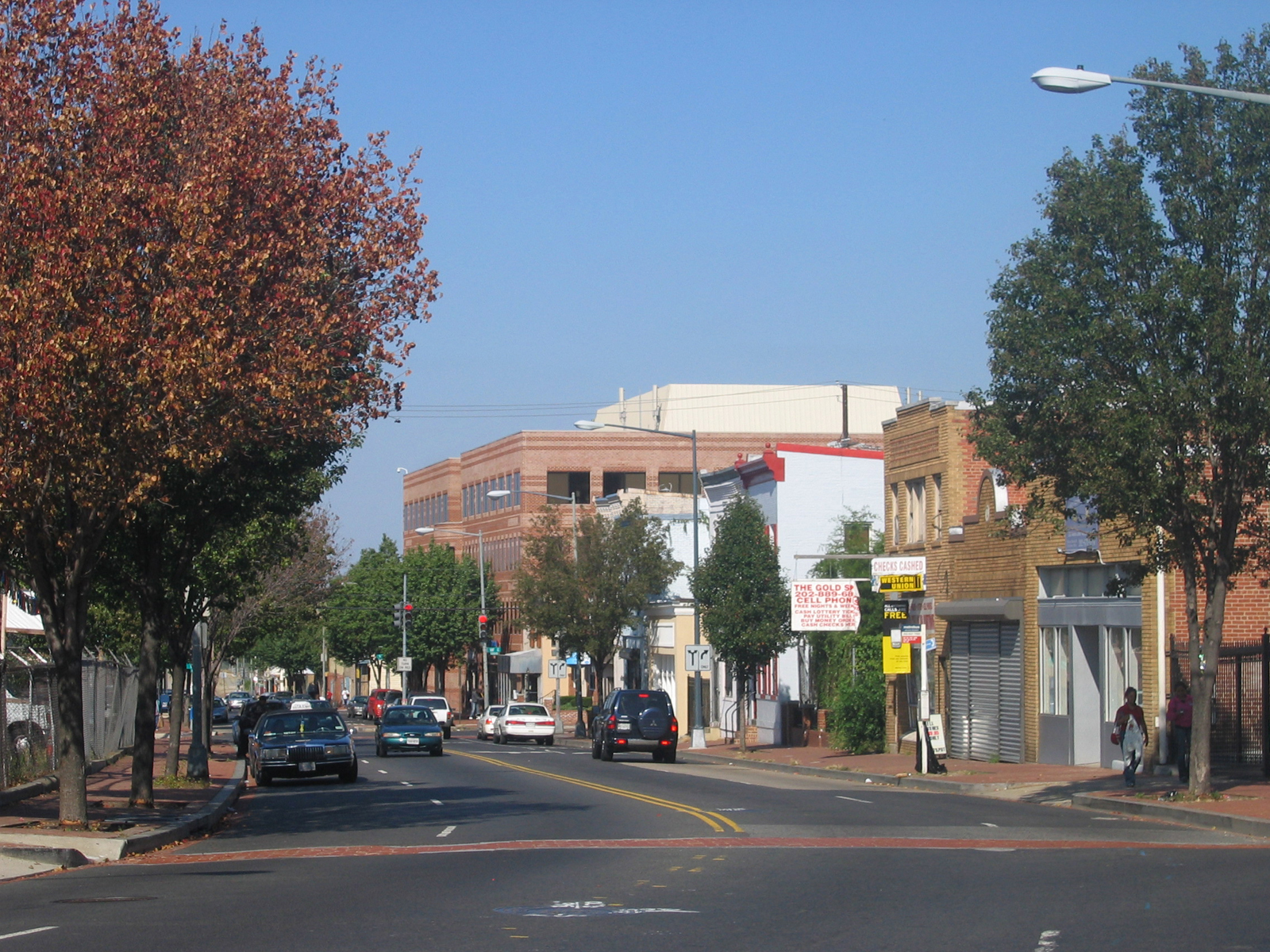
Martin Luther King Jr. Avenue in Anacostia (Washington, D.C.)

- Martin Luther King Jr. Avenue (formerly Nichols Avenue SE) in Washington, D.C., is the main commercial street in the part of Southeast Washington east of the Anacostia River. It intersects Malcolm X Avenue SE (formerly Portland Street SE) near Bolling Air Force Base and St. Elizabeths Hospital. Also very near the street is the home of Frederick Douglass, the famous abolitionist, for whom a major city bridge along South Capitol Street is named. Other streets and bridges named for prominent civil rights figures are Nannie Helen Burroughs Avenue NE and the Whitney Young Bridge along East Capitol Street.

== West Virginia ==
- Charles Town: West Virginia Route 51, Middleway Pike, is also designated as Martin Luther King Jr. Boulevard, from Washington Street west.
- Princeton: The city boasts a one-block "MLK Jr. Ave.", running off Raleigh Road on the north side of town.

== Wisconsin ==
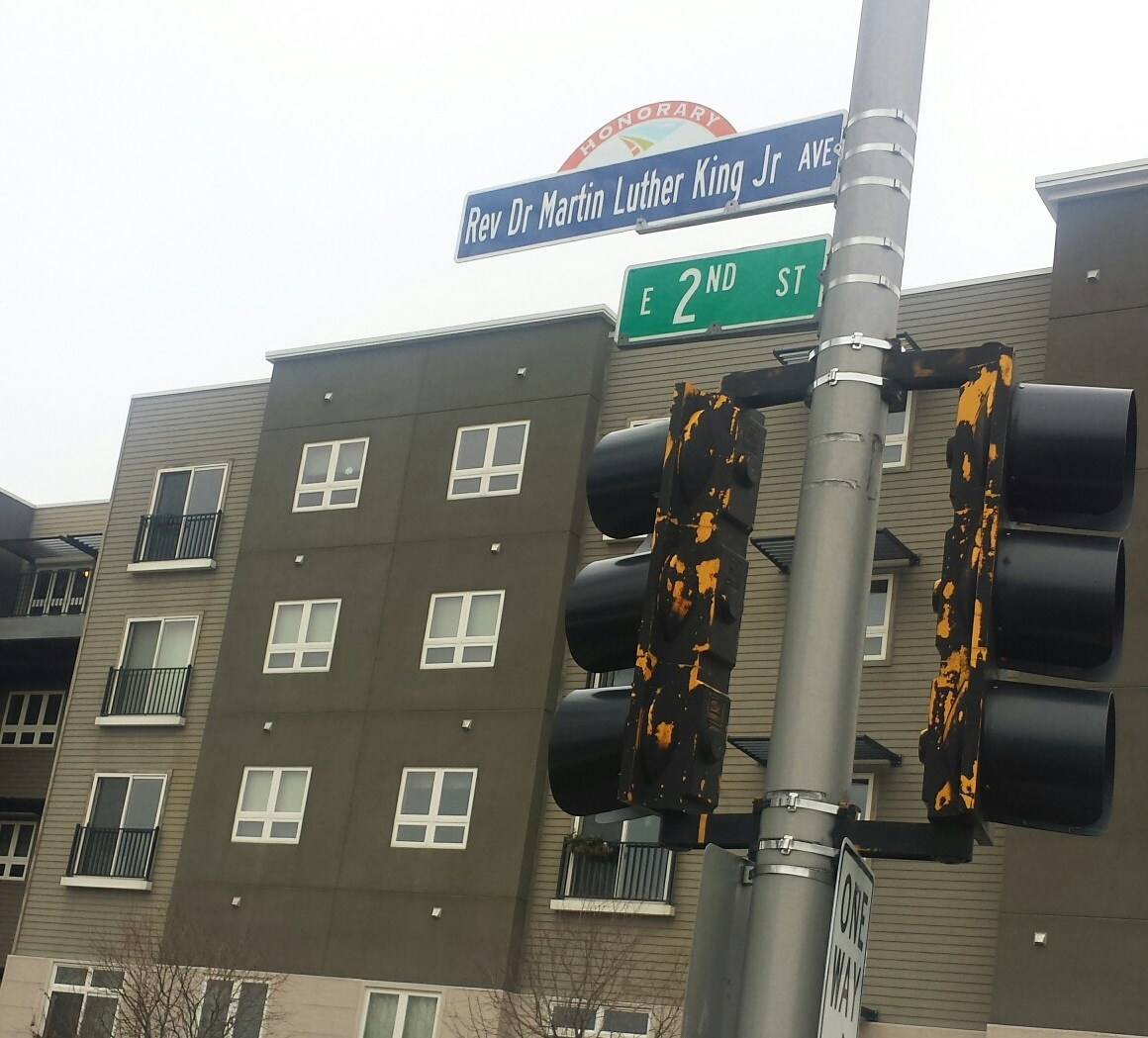
Street sign designating 2nd Street as "honorary" Rev Dr Martin Luther King Jr Avenue, Fond du Lac, Wisconsin

- Fond du Lac: Second Street in Fond du Lac, from Marr Street to Military Road was "honorarily" renamed Rev. Dr. Martin Luther King Avenue in 2017. The "honorary" renaming means that, for mailing-address purposes, it is still designated as Second Street.
- Kenosha: Martin Luther King Drive in Kenosha forms a connector across Lincoln Park, connecting 71st Street on the east side of the park to 69th Street on the west side.
- Madison: The two-block street southeast from the Wisconsin State Capitol building to Wilson Street in front of Monona Terrace is named Martin Luther King Jr. Boulevard. While it is short, it is very prominent, with the city and county's government offices and the main post office being located along it. The street was formerly known as Wisconsin Avenue (which continues under that name northwest of the Capitol). It is not to be confused with the King Street running two blocks east from the Capitol, named for William Rufus King.
- Milwaukee: On the northwest side of downtown Milwaukee, North 3rd Street (from W. McKinley Avenue to W. Capitol Drive), was renamed N. Dr. Martin Luther King Jr. Drive, although residents and street signs sometimes refer to it as King Drive. The renamed portion is a 2-mile-long (3.2 km) stretch through the Harambee, Brewer's Hill, and Halyard Park neighborhoods, which in the 19th century were originally populated by German immigrants but are now predominantly African-American. A branch of the Milwaukee Public Library located on this road is also named the Martin Luther King Library. The remainder of North 3rd Street from McKinley to Wisconsin Avenue was re-designated as King Drive in 2022 after overcoming decades-long protests from businesses in Downtown Milwaukee; that stretch had been renamed Old World Third Street as a compromise, which remains an honorary designation.
- Racine: Dr. Martin Luther King Drive was formerly named Milwaukee Avenue, having once been part of the Native American trail that led to Milwaukee from Chicago. It was renamed sometime in the 1980s. The street stretches 0.8 miles (1.3 km) from Douglas Avenue in the north to the intersection of State Street and Marquette Street. At this southern terminus is a statue of Dr. Martin Luther King, the centerpiece of a small park labeled Dr. Martin Luther King Plaza. Other points of interest on the street are the Dr. Martin Luther King Community Center, and Julian Thomas Elementary School, named in honor of a local civil rights leader.

== Wyoming ==
- Cheyenne: Martin Luther King Drive is an extension of 18th Street west into Martin Luther King Park.

== Outside of the United States ==
- Luanda, Angola: Rua Martin Luther King.
- Vienna, Austria: Martin-Luther-King-Park.
- Anderlecht, Belgium: Place Martin Luther King/Martin Luther Kingplein
- Saint-Nicolas, Belgium: Rue Martin Luther King.
- Diadema, Brazil: Rua Martin Luther King.
- Joinville, Brazil: Rua Martin Luther King.
- Londrina, Brazil: Rua Martin Luther King.
- Rio de Janeiro, Brazil: Avenida Pastor Martin Luther King Jr.
- Antofagasta, Chile: Martin Luther King.
- Copenhagen, Denmark: Martin Luther Kings Vej.
- Bondy, France: Rue Martin Luther King.
- Châtenoy-le-Royal, France: Rue Martin Luther King.
- Gauchy, France: Rue Martin Luther King.
- Hennebont, France: Rue Martin Luther King.
- La Chapelle-sur-Erdre, France: Rue Martin Luther King.
- Nantes, France: Boulevard Martin Luther King.
- Pantin, France: Rue Martin Luther King.
- Sevran, France: Avenue Martin Luther King.
- Saint-Pierre, Réunion (France): Rue M.L.K.
- Bonn, Germany: Martin-Luther-King-Straße.
- Frankfurt am Main, Germany: Martin-Luther-King-Park.
- Mainz, Germany: Dr.-Martin-Luther-King-Weg.
- Münster, Germany: Martin-Luther-King-Weg.
- Rostock, Germany: Martin-Luther-King-Allee.
- Port-au-Prince, Haiti: Avenue M.L.K.
- Jerusalem, Israel: Martin Luther King Street.
- Bari, Italy: Via Martin Luther King.
- Bergamo, Italy: Via Martin Luther King.
- Bologna, Italy: Via Martin Luther King.
- Castelnovo ne' Monti, Italy: Via Martin Luther King.
- Correzzana, Italy: Via Martin Luther King.
- Livorno, Italy: Via Martin Luther King.
- Reggio Emilia, Italy: Via Martin Luther King.
- Roncadelle, Italy: Via Martin Luther King.
- Pembroke, Malta: M.L.K.
- Akersloot, Netherlands: Martin Luther Kingstraat.
- Alkmaar, Netherlands: Martin Luther Kingweg.
- Amsterdam, Netherlands: Martin Luther Kingpark.
- Andel, Netherlands: Dr. Martin Luther Kingplein.
- Assen, Netherlands: Martin Luther Kingweg.
- Berghem, Netherlands: Martin Luther Kingstraat.
- Beverwijk, Netherlands: Martin Luther Kinglaan.
- (Netherlands) De Bilt, Martin Luther Kingweg.
- Castricum, Netherlands: Martin Luther Kinglaan.
- Culemborg, Netherlands: Martin Luther King.
- Diemen, Netherlands: Martin Luther Kinglaan.
- Drachten, Netherlands: Martin Luther Kingsingel.
- Ede, Netherlands: Martin Luther Kingstate.
- (Netherlands) Eijsden, M.L. Kingstraat.
- Eindhoven, Netherlands: Martin Luther Kingstraat.
- Epe, Netherlands: Martin Luther Kingweg.
- Eygelshoven, Netherlands: Martin Luther Kingstraat.
- Geleen, Netherlands: Martin Luther Kingplein.
- Goirle, Netherlands: Martin Luther Kinglaan.
- 's-Gravenzande, Netherlands: Martin Luther Kingstraat.
- Haarlem, Netherlands: Martin Luther Kinglaan.
- The Hague, Netherlands: Martin Luther Kinglaan.
- Heerhugowaard, Netherlands: Martin Luther Kingstraat.
- Heinenoord, Netherlands: Martin Luther Kingstraat.
- Hellevoetsluis, Netherlands: Martin Luther Kinglaan.
- Hengelo, Netherlands: Dr. Martin Luther Kingstraat.
- Hoensbroek, Netherlands: Dr. Martin Luther Kinglaan.
- Hoofddorp, Netherlands: Martin Luther Kingstraat and Martin Luther Kingpad.
- Hoogezand, Netherlands: Martin Luther Kingstraat.
- Huizen, Netherlands: Martin Luther Kingpark.
- Landsmeer, Netherlands: Dr. M.L. Kingstraat.
- Leiden, Netherlands: Martin Luther Kingpad.
- Limbricht, Netherlands: Martin Luther Kingstraat.
- Lopik, Netherlands: Doctor Martin Luther Kinghof.
- (Netherlands) Maastricht, Martin Luther Kingdomein.
- Oss, Netherlands: Martin Luther Kingplein.
- Oud-Beijerland, Netherlands: Martin Luther Kingerf.
- Oud-Vossemeer, Netherlands: Martin Luther Kingstraat.
- Purmerend, Netherlands: Ds. Martin Luther Kingweg.
- Puth, Netherlands: Martin-Luther-Kingstraat.
- Rijswijk, Netherlands: Martin Luther Kinglaan.
- Roden, Netherlands: Martin Luther Kingstraat.
- Rotterdam, Netherlands: Martin Luther Kingweg.
- Utrecht, Netherlands: Ds. Martin Luther Kinglaan.
- Veenendaal, Netherlands: Martin Luther Kingstraat.
- Vlissingen, Netherlands: Martin Luther Kingstraat.
- Zaandam, Netherlands: Ds. Martin Luther Kingweg.
- Zeist, Netherlands: Martin Luther Kinglaan.
- (Netherlands) Zetten, Martin Luther Kingplantsoen.
- (Netherlands) Zoetermeer, Martin Luther Kinglaan.
- Estoril, Portugal: Rua Martin Luther King.
- Lisbon, Portugal: Rua Martin Luther King.
- Dakar, Senegal: Boulevard Martin Luther King.
- Ermelo, South Africa: Martin Luther King Street.
- Alcorcón, Spain: Calle Martín Luther King.
- Las Palmas de Gran Canaria, Spain: Calle Martin Luther King Junior.
- Peligros, Spain: Calle Martín Luther King.
- Vitoria-Gasteiz, Spain: Martín Luther King Kalea.
- Uppsala, Sweden: Martin Luther Kings plan.
- Tunis, Tunisia: Rue M.L.K.
- Harlow, United Kingdom: Luther King Road.
- Huntingdon, United Kingdom: Martin Luther King Close.
- Walthamstow, London, United Kingdom: Luther King Close.
- Phu My Hung, Ho Chi Minh City, Vietnam: Đường Luther King.

== Lists ==
- Martin Luther King Jr. Boulevard (disambiguation)
- Martin Luther King Jr. Drive (disambiguation)
- Martin Luther King Jr. Expressway (disambiguation)
- Martin Luther King Jr. Parkway (disambiguation)
- Martin Luther King Jr. Way (disambiguation)

== See also ==
- Memorials to Martin Luther King Jr.
- Civil rights movement in popular culture
- List of museums focused on African Americans
- List of African-American historic places
- Artworks commemorating African Americans in Washington, D.C.
- King County, Washington, which includes Seattle, is named for King (though it was previously named for William Rufus King).
