= Martin Luther King Bridge (Port Arthur, Texas) =

Gulfgate Bridge
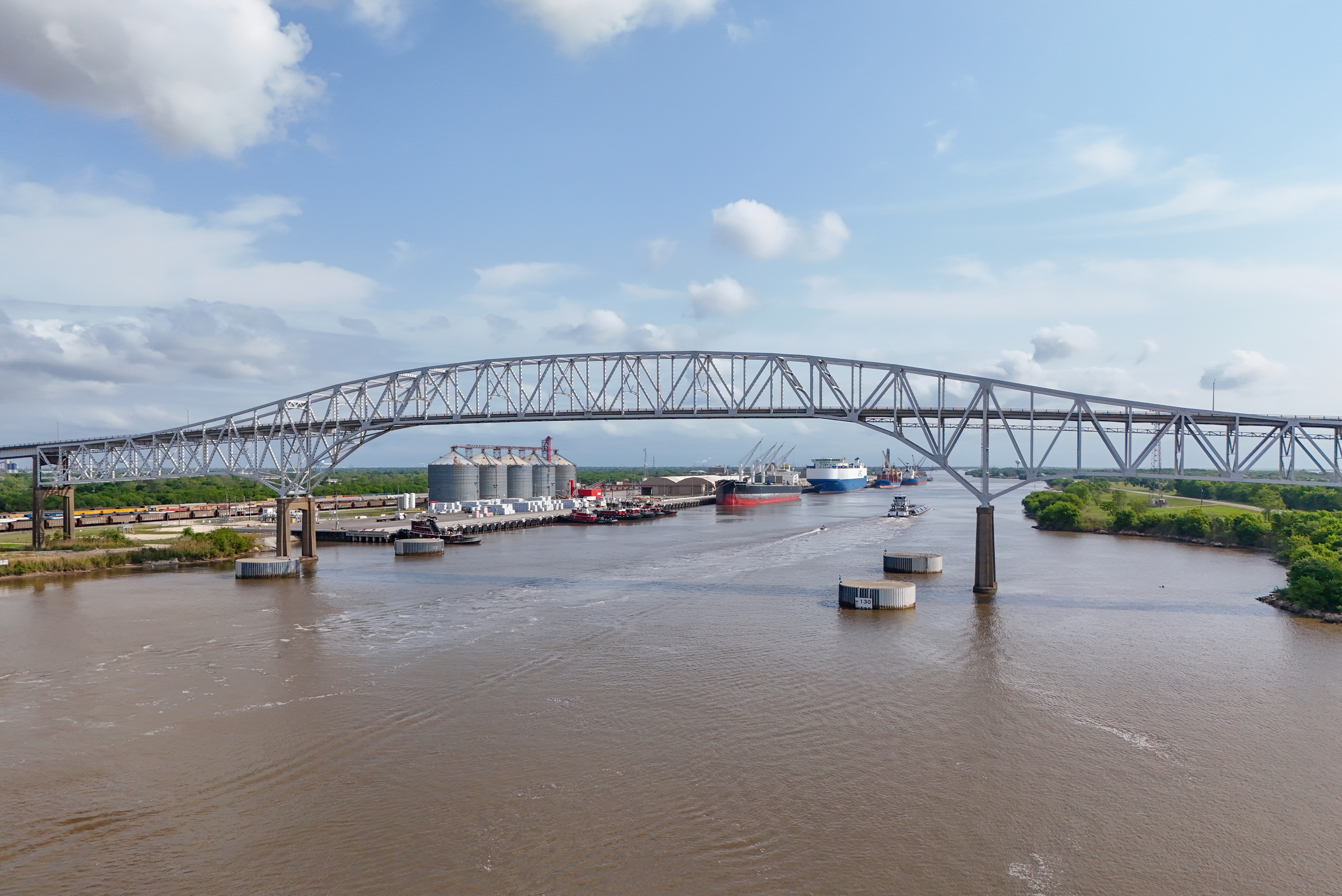
- Coordinates: 29.8534°N 93.9484°W
- Carries: two lanes of SH 82
- Crosses: Gulf Intracoastal Waterway
- Locale: Port Arthur, Texas
- Official name: Martin Luther King Bridge
- Maintained by: Texas Department of Transportation
- ID number: TXNBI 201240236701001

Characteristics
- Design: cantilever bridge
- Total length: 5,032.4 feet (1,533.9 m)
- Width: 27.9 feet (8.5 m)
- Longest span: 664.1 feet (202.4 m)
- Clearance above: 17.9 feet (5.5 m)

History
- Opened: 1970

Location
- Interactive map of Gulfgate Bridge

The Martin Luther King Bridge, of Port Arthur, Texas, is a cantilever bridge spanning the Sabine-Neches ship canal. It was opened in 1970 as the Gulfgate Bridge, and allows Texas State Highway 82, a short (13 miles (21 km)) highway, to cross the canal and continue on Pleasure Island to the Texas-Louisiana border, connecting Port Arthur to Louisiana Highway 82.
